= Cima Pedum =

Mountain in Italy

Coordinates: 46°02′40″N 8°26′54″E

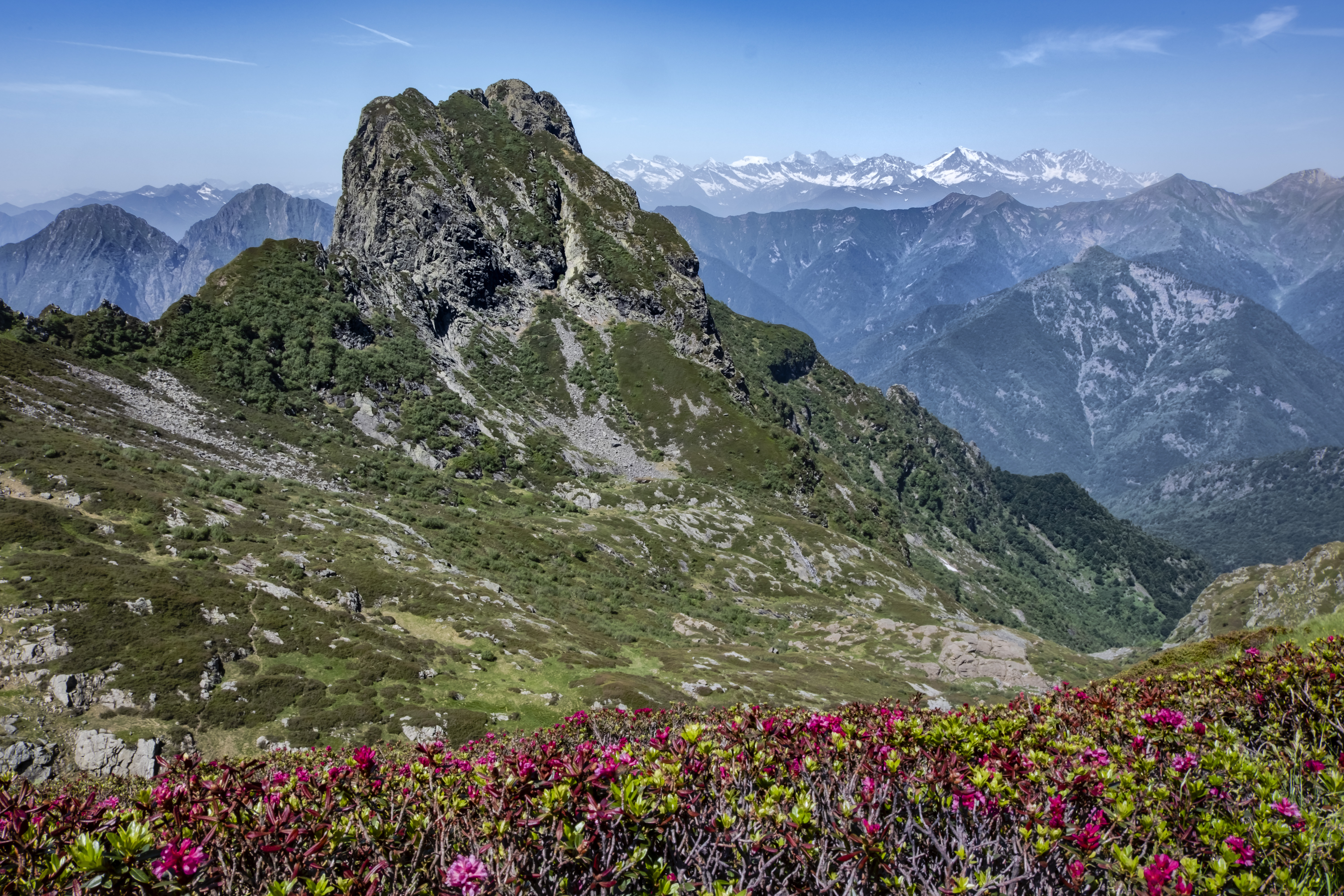

Highest point
- Elevation: 2,111 m (6,926 ft)
- Prominence: 176 m (577 ft)

Geography
- Location: Piedmont, Italy
- Parent range: Lepontine Alps

Cima Pedum is a mountain of Piedmont, Italy, with an elevation of 2,111 metres (6,926 ft). It is located in the Lepontine Alps, in the Province of Verbano-Cusio-Ossola.

== Details ==
Cima Pedum is located at the center of the Val Grande, northwest of the Laurasca-Cima Sasso range. It consists of three rocky peaks, divided by deep rifts, of which the western one is the tallest.

The northern and southern sides of Cima Pedum are the wildest part of the Val Grande; the first strict nature reserve of the Alps, which would later become part of the Val Grande National Park, was established here in 1967.

The peak of Cima Pedum was first climbed in 1882 by Carlo Sutermeister, a Swiss engineer who promoted the economic development of the Val Grande and was among the founders of the Verbano section of the Italian Alpine Club. The steep northern and southern faces were only first climbed in the late 1970s.

Cima Pedum lies within the territory of Cossogno and Malesco. It can be reached with a difficult hiking path starting from Fondo Li Gabbi (Malesco) and passing through Bivacco Bocchetta di Campo, an unmanned mountain hut located between Cima Pedum and Cima di Binà.
