= Bove Path =

Via Ferrata path on the Italian alps

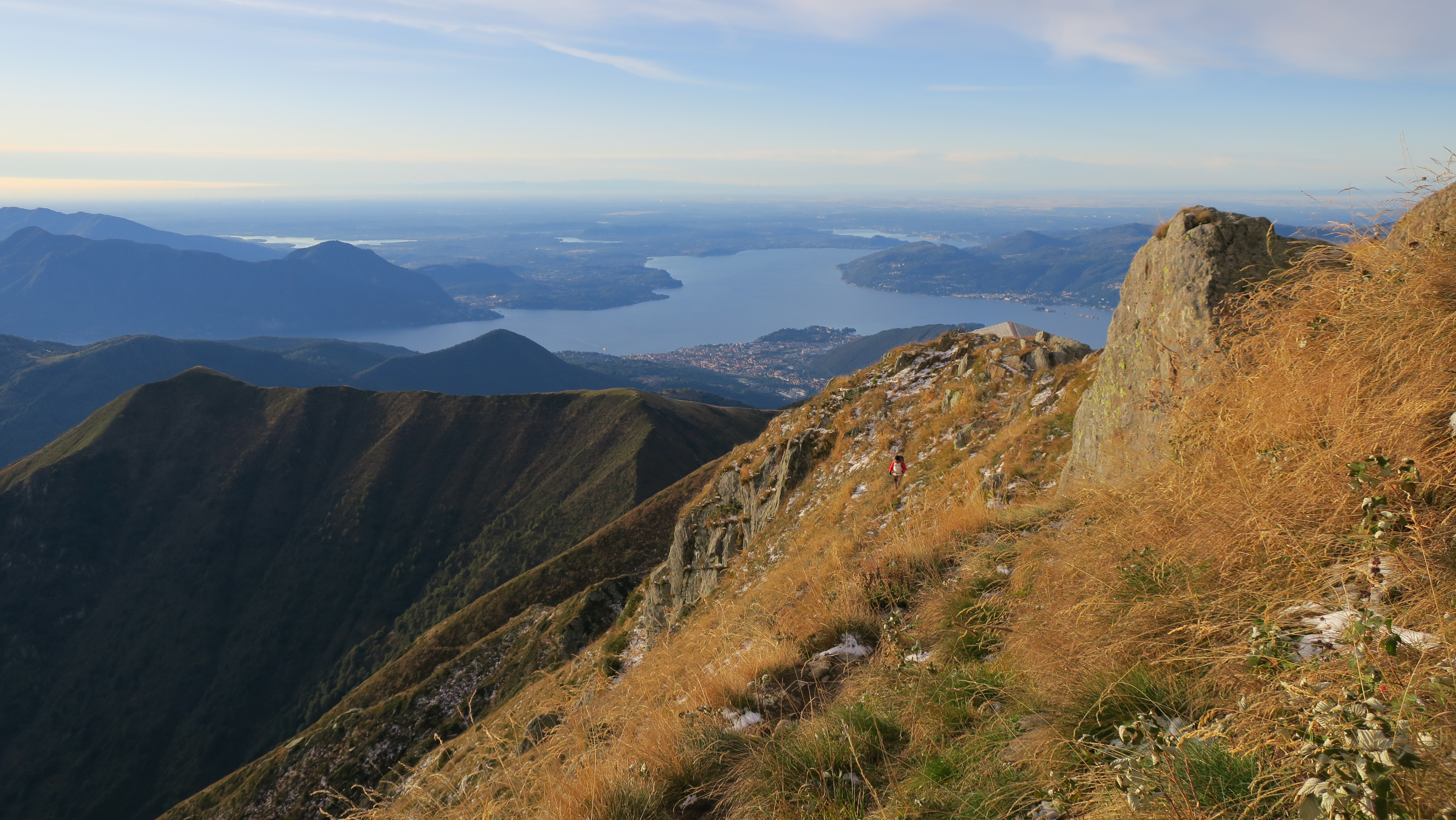
- Length: 36 km (22 mi)
- Location: Val Grande National Park, Italy
- Trailheads: Loop trail
- Use: Hiking, Via Ferrata
- Elevation change: 3,800 m (12,500 ft)
- Highest point: 2,156 m (7,073 ft)
- Lowest point: 463 m (1,519 ft)
- Difficulty: Only experts
- Months: Late Spring - Early Autumn
- Maintained by: Val Grande National Park
- Website: https://www.parcovalgrande.it/Esentiero-bove.php

Trail map
- The "Bove Path" (Sentiero Bove), Val Grande National Park, Italy

The Bove Path (Sentiero Bove, Italian pronunciation: [senˈtjɛːro ˈbɔːve]) is a 36 kilometres (22 mi) loop trail located in the Val Grande National Park in the Piedmont region of Northern Italy. The trail is known as the oldest Via ferrata ("iron path") and first Alta Via. i.e., high-altitude trail, in the Alps. The trail was created and named in 1892 as a memorial to the Italian navigator and explorer Giacomo Bove.

== Geographical location ==
The Bove Path is located within the borders of the Verbano-Cusio-Ossola province, in the Val Grande National Park. This protected area is recognized as one of the largest wilderness reserves in Italy. The path offers views of both the Pennine Alps and the Lepontine Alps.

The trail is defined to the south and southwest by Lake Maggiore, one of the largest lakes in Italy. To the north, it extends to the Vigezzo Valley, also called the "Valley of the Painters" due to its association with landscape artists. The northwest side is bordered by the Valle Cannobina, recognizable for its forests and the Cannobino River that flows through it. To the west, the trail overlooks the Ossola valley, a major valley system that connects to the Simplon Pass and provides access to Switzerland.

== History ==
The trail originated as an ancient route for shepherds and farmers to move livestock seasonally from the Verbano region to the Ossola Valley for summer grazing. Initially it evolved as a network of pastoral paths to enable the transfer of cattle from the Verbano region to the higher Ossola Valley in search of better grazing areas during the summer. These paths were part of the transhumance (seasonal migration of livestock) and played an economic role in the region, allowing livestock to graze in the mountains during warmer months and return to the lower valleys in winter. The historical role of these pastoral paths laid the foundation for the development of the modern-day Bove Path, linking geographical areas with the agricultural and cultural heritage of the region.

=== Honoring the legacy of Giacomo Bove ===
On July 31, 1880, a fundraising event took place in Intra, a frazione of the municipality of Verbania, to support Giacomo Bove, an Italian sea-going explorer of the 19th century, and his planned Antarctic expedition. Bove had previously sailed with Adolf Erik Nordenskiöld on the first voyage through the Northeast Passage, and later explored Tierra del Fuego and the Congo River. Following Bove's suicide in Verona on August 9, 1887, the funds collected were used to construct a memorial in his honor. This initiative later led to the creation of the trail in 1889.

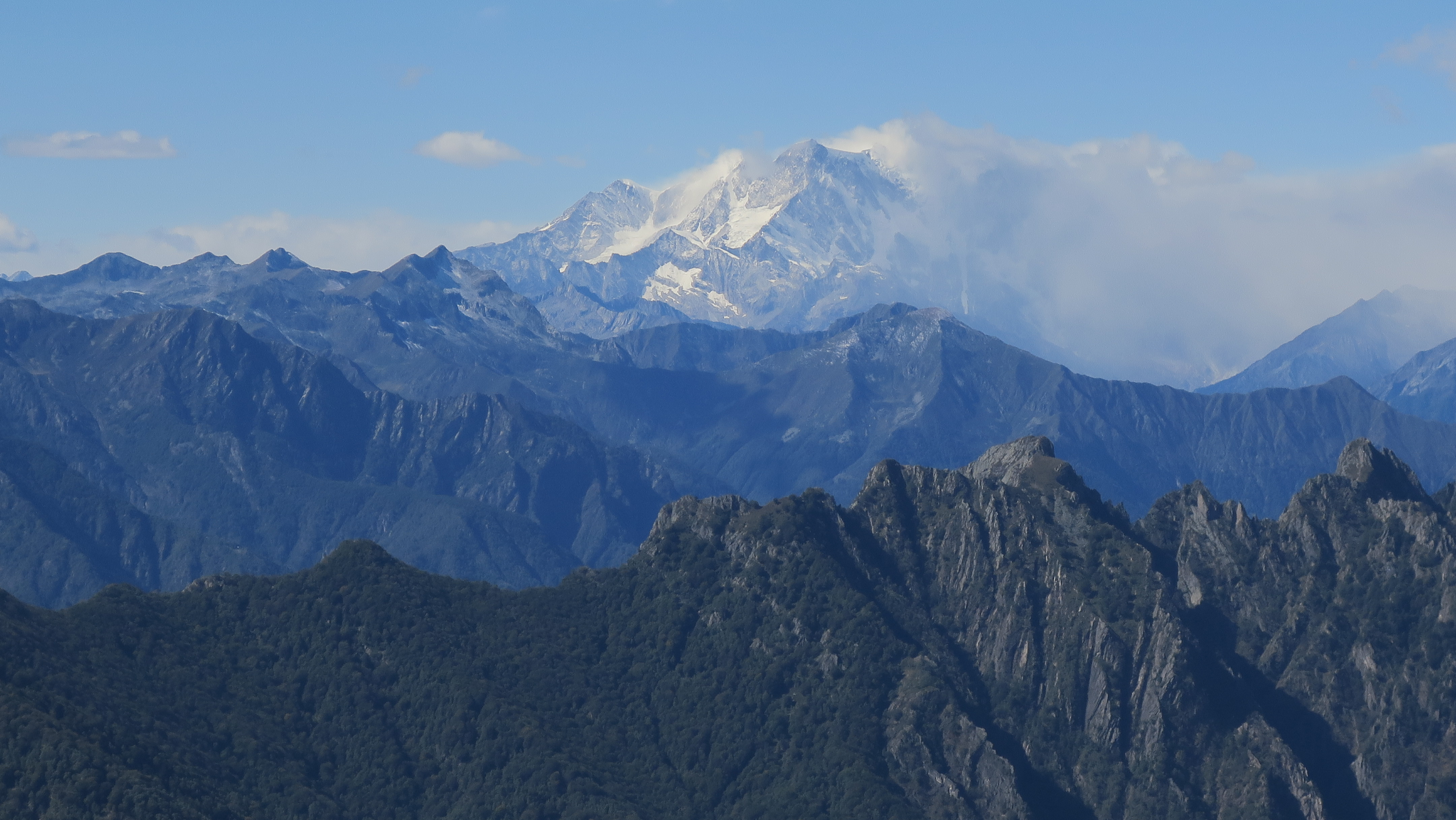
View from Pian Cavallone on the Bove Path, looking towards the Monte Rosa massif, Val Grande National Park, Italy

In 1890, the Verbano section of the CAI (Italian Alpine Club) commissioned local alpine guide Antonio Garoni to design and construct the path. The trail was laid along the ridges between Monte Zeda and the Bocchetta di Terza, with the first section completed in 1891. The extension to Bocchetta di Scaredi was finished in 1892. The trail is notable for integrating mountaineering techniques with hiking. It included features such as iron ladders and chains secured to rock faces, assisting hikers in navigating challenging terrain. By 1892, it had become one of the first multi-day hiking routes in the Alps, linking the Verbano and Ossola valleys through a harsh, high-altitude environment.

=== Decline and rediscovery ===
After World War II, the Bove Path experienced significant decline. Exposure to harsh weather, lack of upkeep, and the passage of time led to its deterioration, especially in the more demanding sections. By the late 1970s, only fragments of the original trail could be found in the rugged terrain of the Torrione section. In 1977, members of the CAI Verbano-Intra branch, including mountaineer Gualtiero Rognoni, began efforts to rediscover and restore the trail. Over several years, they retraced the route from Monte Zeda to Bocchetta di Terza, uncovering portions of Garoni's original work. Some sections, particularly around Monte Torrione, remained hidden.

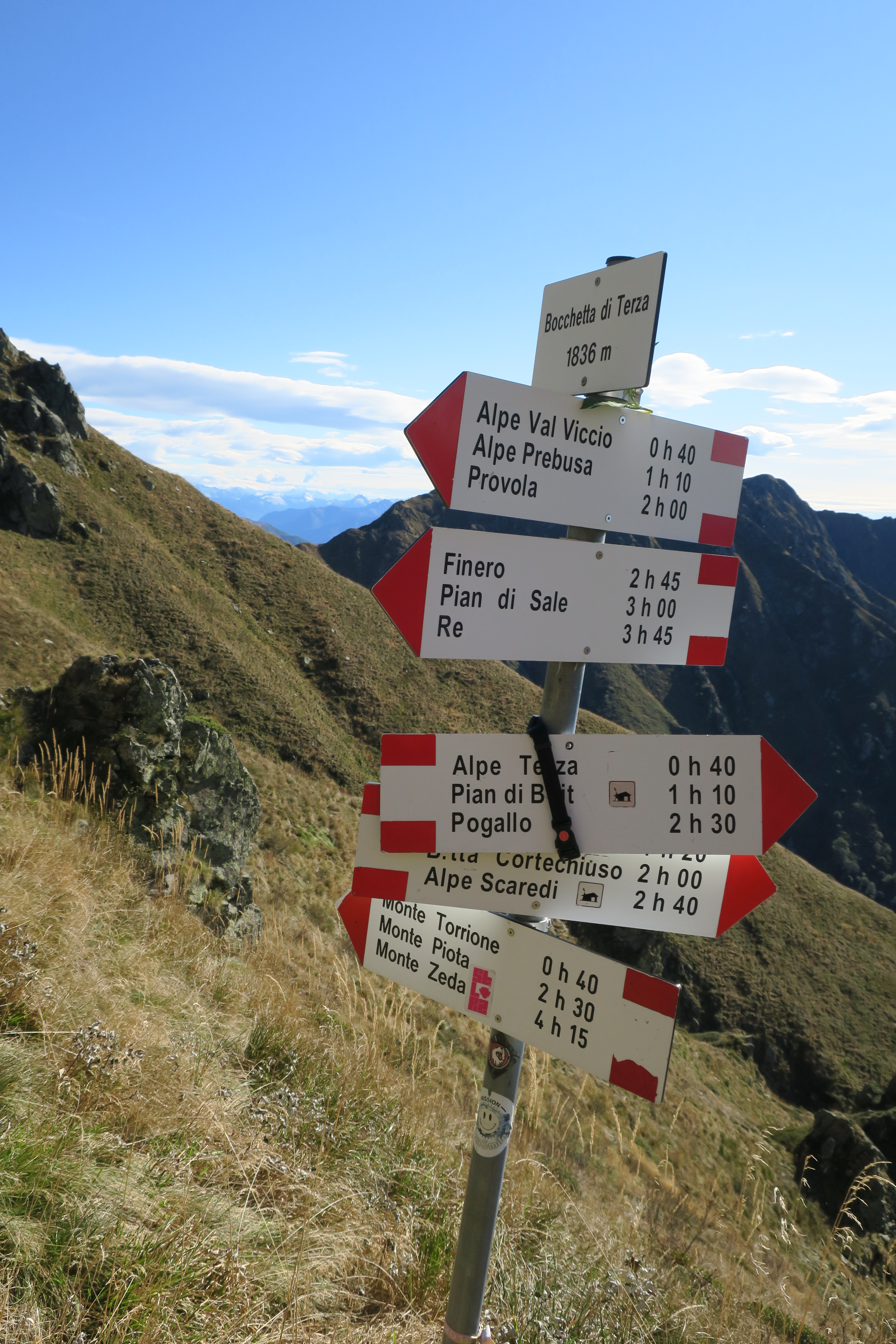
Signposts on the "Bove Path" (Sentiero Bove), Val Grande National Park, Italy

In 1983, the mountain guide Achille Montani located the original iron anchors installed by Garoni on Monte Torrione. This discovery enabled the complete restoration of the trail, which was reopened to the public in 1984, fully restored and equipped with new bolted anchors and chains for safety.

Further restoration projects were undertaken in the 1990s to celebrate the trail's centenary and improve its safety and accessibility. In 1997, coinciding with the centenary of both the path and the Bocchetta di Campo refuge, an event called "Another Pass" led to the extension of the original trail to include the circumnavigation of the peaks around the Val Pogallo from Cicogna. Efforts by local communities and the Val Grande National Park have ensured the path's maintenance, despite challenges such as vandalism in 1987. In 1989, further works were carried out by the Maioli Tiziano team, followed by additional efforts in the following years by the Val Grande Cooperative, on behalf of the local mountain communities and the Val Grande National Park Authority. In 2019, further reinforcement work was undertaken to strengthen the section between Pian Cavallone and Monte Zeda.

=== Modern-day status ===
The Bove Path remains a route designed for experienced mountain hikers. Typically completed over three to four days, it is recognized as one of the most demanding hiking trails in the Italian Alps. The path combines elements of hiking and climbing, combining the features of an alpine climbing route with those of a scenic trekking trail.

The Bove Path is best traversed between late spring and early autumn when the climate is most favorable. During winter, it is not recommended due to harsh temperatures and its exposure to adverse weather conditions. In contrast, summer poses different challenges: the lack of water sources along the route and prolonged exposure to the sun make it less advisable for hiking.

Maintained by the CAI Verbano and the Val Grande National Park, the trail undergoes regular updates to improve safety and accessibility. It forms part of the Upper Verbano Trail (Sentiero dell'Alto Verbano or Alta Via del Verbano in Italian), a long-distance hiking route of regionional natural and historical significance.

== Route of the Bove Path ==
This circular trail covers approximately 36 kilometres (22.27 miles), with a total elevation gain of around 3,500 meters. It is a 2–4 days path recommended for experienced hikers with physical fitness and alpine trekking skills. The trail is classified as EE (Expert Hikers) and EEA (Expert hikers with climbing equipment) on the CAI difficulty scale due to the cliffs and steep walls.

=== Original Path ===
==== From Cicogna to Passo delle Crocette ====
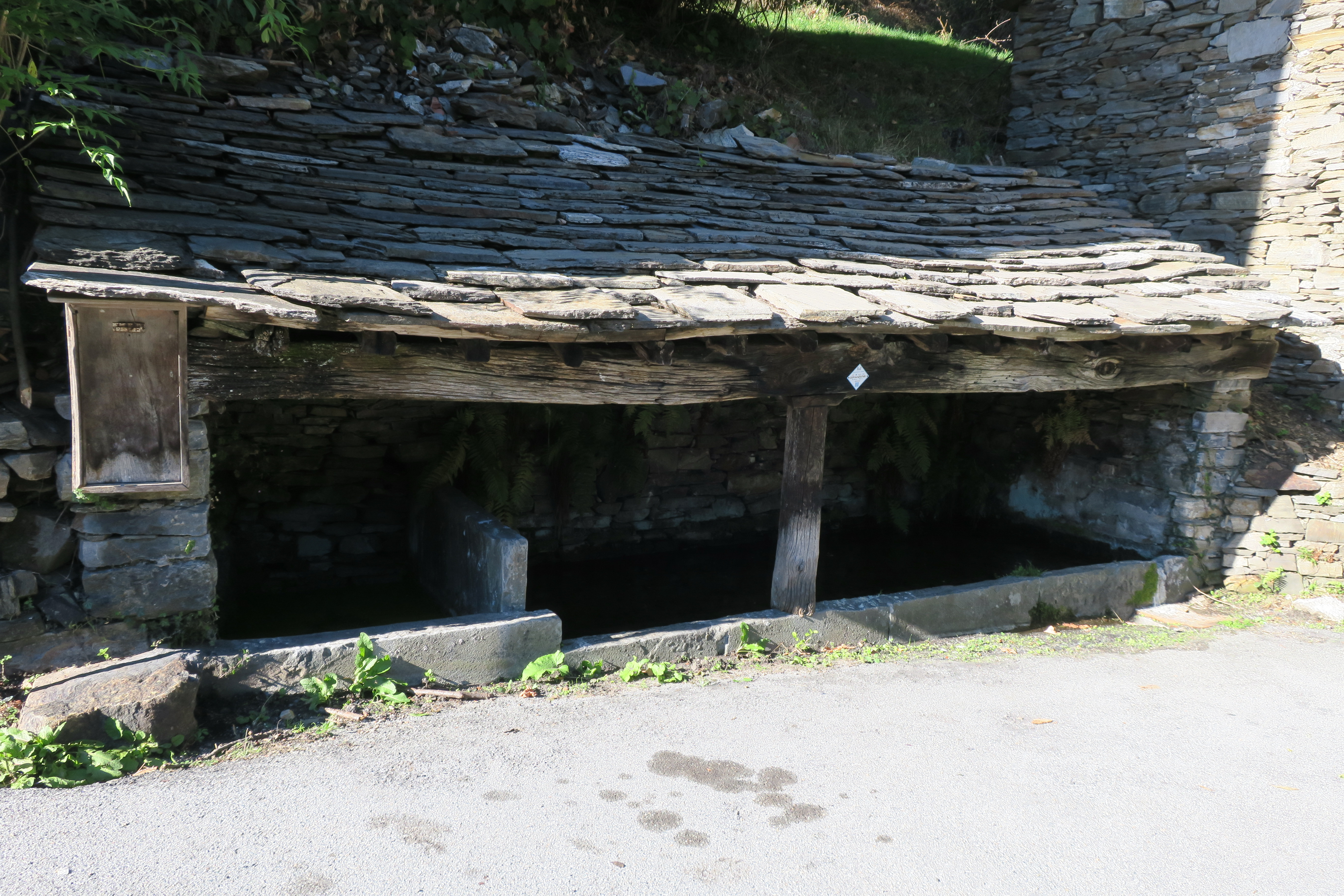
Starting point of the Bove Path in Cicogna, Val Grande National Park, Italy

The trail starts in the mountain village of Cicogna, located at an elevation of 732 meters. Hikers follow the Sutermeister Road, a mule track that leads to the Buia Bridge over the Rio Pogallo. From there, the route ascends through woodlands to reach Alpe Curgei at 1,358 meters. This area, characterized by dense forests, provides an initial section before the more challenging parts of the trail.

From Alpe Curgei, the path ascends towards Pian Cavallone, with views of the Monte Rosa massif. The trail continues north to Passo della Forcola, followed by a steep climb to the summit of Pizzo Marona. This section includes exposed ridgelines that require cautious footing and ends at the peak of Monte Zeda (2,156 meters). Monte Zeda is historically notable for the Cadorna Line, a network of World War I military fortifications.

Descending from Monte Zeda, hikers reach the alpine pastures of Alpe Fornà before ascending again along the ridge that separates Val Pogallo and Val Cannobina. This section leads to Crocette Pass, a narrow and exposed mountain pass with chains for added safety. The trail also passes near the Torri di Terza, which are marked by rocky outcrops and include some of the more technically difficult sections of the route.

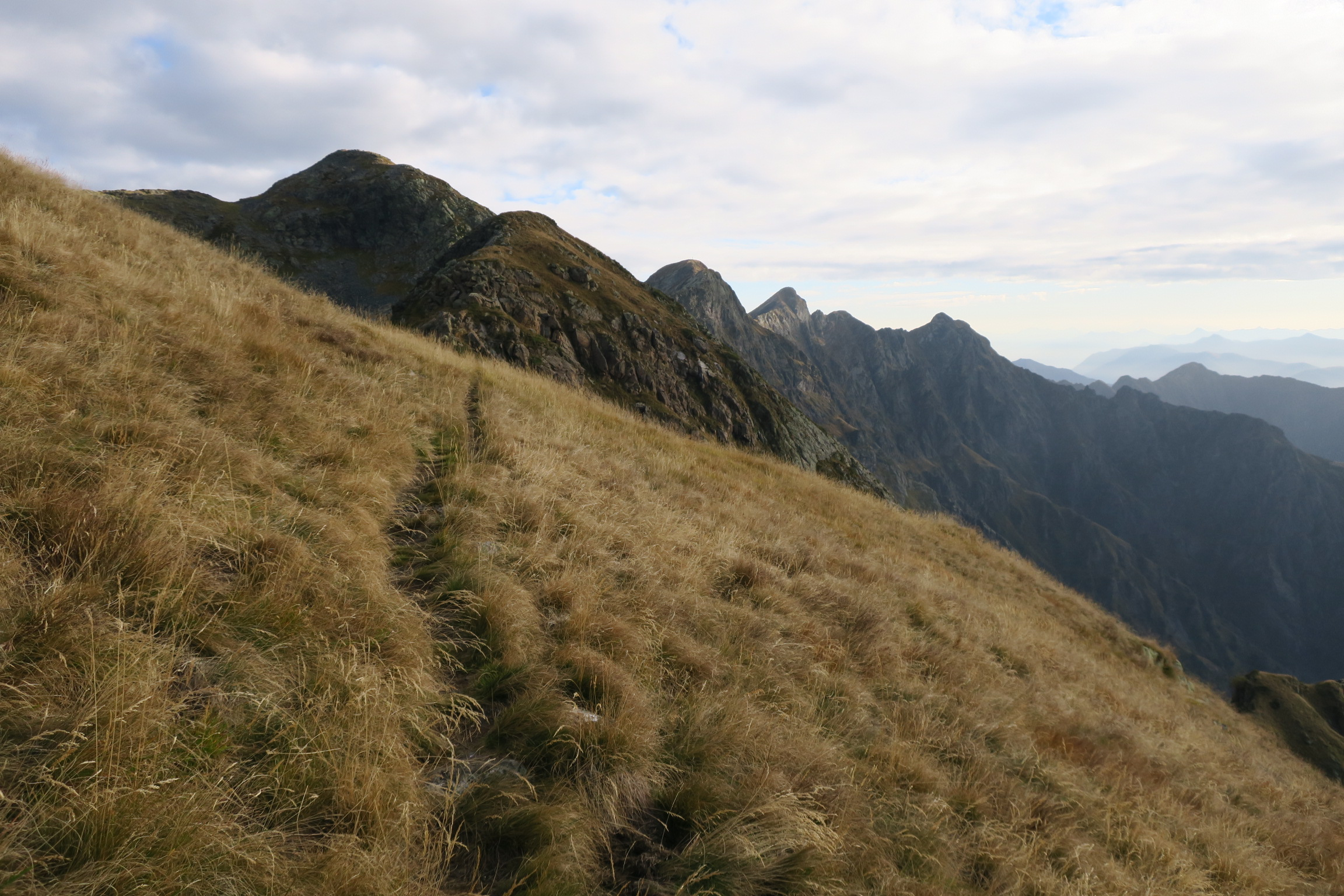
View of The Bove Path towards Alpe Scaredi, Val Grande National Park, Italy

==== From Passo delle Crocette to Bocchetta di Campo ====
Continuing along the eastern ridge, the trail passes by Cima delle Marsicce, providing views of the surrounding landscape. Hikers then descend into the remote valley of Il Fiume, reaching the Cortechiuso bivouac. From there, a climb leads to Bocchetta di Scaredi, followed by a traverse to Bocchetta di Campo. This section has limited water sources, so hikers should bring sufficient supplies. The route passes near Monte Pedum, often regarded as a central point in the Val Grande wilderness.

==== Return to Cicogna ====
The final segment begins with a descent through the narrow and rough Strette del Casé, a canyon shaped by centuries of water flow. The trail then passes near the Corone di Ghina, before continuing through the alpine meadows of Alpe Cavrua. From there, it descends steeply to Corte di Pogallo, a former pastoral settlement, and reconnects with the Sutermeister Road, leading back to Cicogna to complete the loop.

==== Trail Features ====
Parts of the Bove Path are via ferrata, especially between Monte Zeda and Passo delle Crocette. In these sections, hikers will find chains and iron footholds attached to steep rock faces. Due to the exposed nature of the trail, hikers attempting the Bove Path are advised to carry proper safety equipment, including helmets, harnesses and climbing gloves for safety.

The variability of visibility and terrain conditions, depending on the weather and season, makes the trail challenging and risky to navigate, especially since, beyond Mount Zeda, maintenance work on the trail and the restoration of signage have not yet been completed.

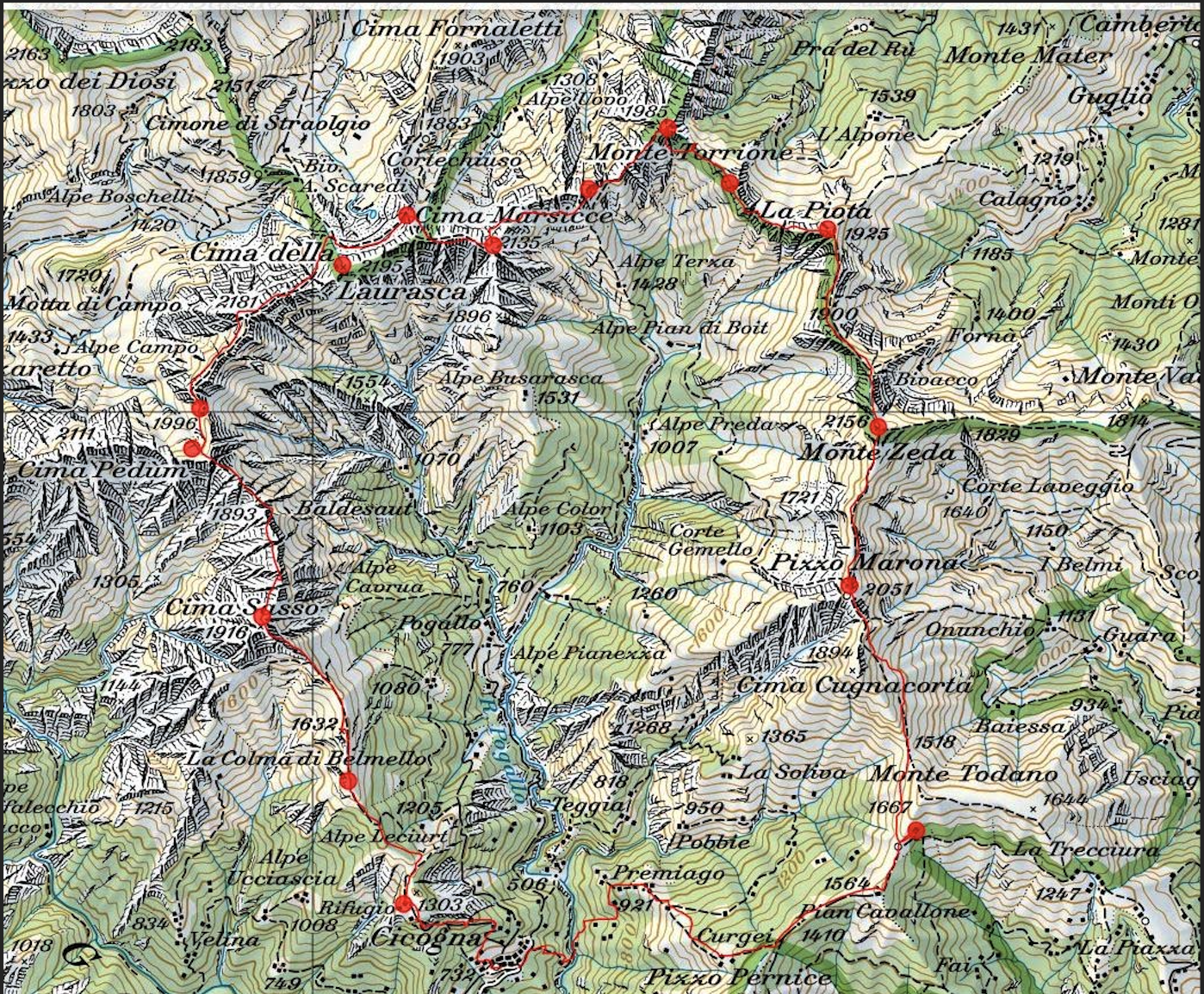
Route of the Extended Bove Path, Val Grande National Park, Italy

=== Extended Path ===
The Extended Bove Path is a variant of the original Bove Path that shares the same starting and ending points but introduces changes to the route. Unlike the original version, the extended trail is designed to be completed in a clockwise direction. This adjustment addresses the fact that the route has been altered and the most challenging portion is situated near the beginning of the trail. It is classified as F in the CAI classification and T5 in the CAS classification.

==== From Cicogna to Cima Sasso ====
Hikers heading toward Alpe Prà and the Casa dell'Alpino (originally built to serve as a refuge for alpine troops), follow a marked trail that ascends through a wooded area. The path transitions from forest to open meadows before reaching Alpe Prà at an elevation of 1,300 meters. From this point, the trail traverses a beech forest and passes through a rocky area leading towards Val Pogallo and Alpe Leciuri. Continuing along the ridge, the trail ascends gradually through another beech grove, leading to a more level section that culminates at the Colma di Belmello at 1,590 meters. This portion includes some exposed sections. From Colma di Belmello, the route steepens, reaching the summit of Cima Sasso at 1,916 meters.

==== From Cima Sasso to "Bivacco Bocchetta di Campo" ====
From Cima Sasso, the trail begins a steep descent, following a rugged ridge that leads toward Bocchetta di Campo. This section is known for its challenging terrain, with rocky outcrops and uneven surfaces that require careful navigation.

The Corone di Ghina is a particularly difficult portion of the route, equipped with a via ferrata to help trekkers traverse exposed rock faces. It requires the use of in situ iron ladders, cables, and footholds to safely navigate this challenging passage. Upon reaching Bocchetta di Campo, hikers encounter the Strette del Casé that marks the transition between the original and extended Bove Path, where hikers can choose to continue with the original Bove Path or return to Cicogna.

Mountain huts and bivouacs	Mountain	Elevation	Coordinates	Beds	Water	Type of heating	Type of entry
Bivacco del Gufo all'Alpe Curgei	Alpe Curgei	1.350m	46.0037996N, 8.5179448E	8	yes	wood stove	open
Rifugio CAI Pian Cavallone	Pian Cavallone	1.530m	46.0133452N, 8.5393274E	24	yes	wood stove	guarded
Bivacco Ubaldo Cavallasca "Cucciolo"	Alpe Fornà	1.710m	46.0500036N, 8.5392201E	13	yes	wood stove	open
Bivacco Lidesh	Alpe Lidesh	1.590m	46.0757975N, 8.5200644E	5	yes	wood stove	open
Bivacco Cortechiuso	Cortechiuso	1.883m	46.0680291N, 8.4847672E	8	yes	wood stove	open
Bivacco Pian di Boit	Alpi di Boit	1122m	46.0514547N, 8.5122723E	8	not guaranteed	wood stove	open
Bivacco Vou	Alpe Vou	1.410m	46.0703054N, 8.4948456E	8	yes, river	wood stove	open
Bivacco Scaredi	Alpe Scaredi	1.841m	46.0651068N, 8.4707792E	15	yes	wood stove	open
Bivacco Bocchetta di Campo	Bocchetta di Campo	1.994m	46.0471851N, 8.4595585E	13	not guaranteed	wood stove	open

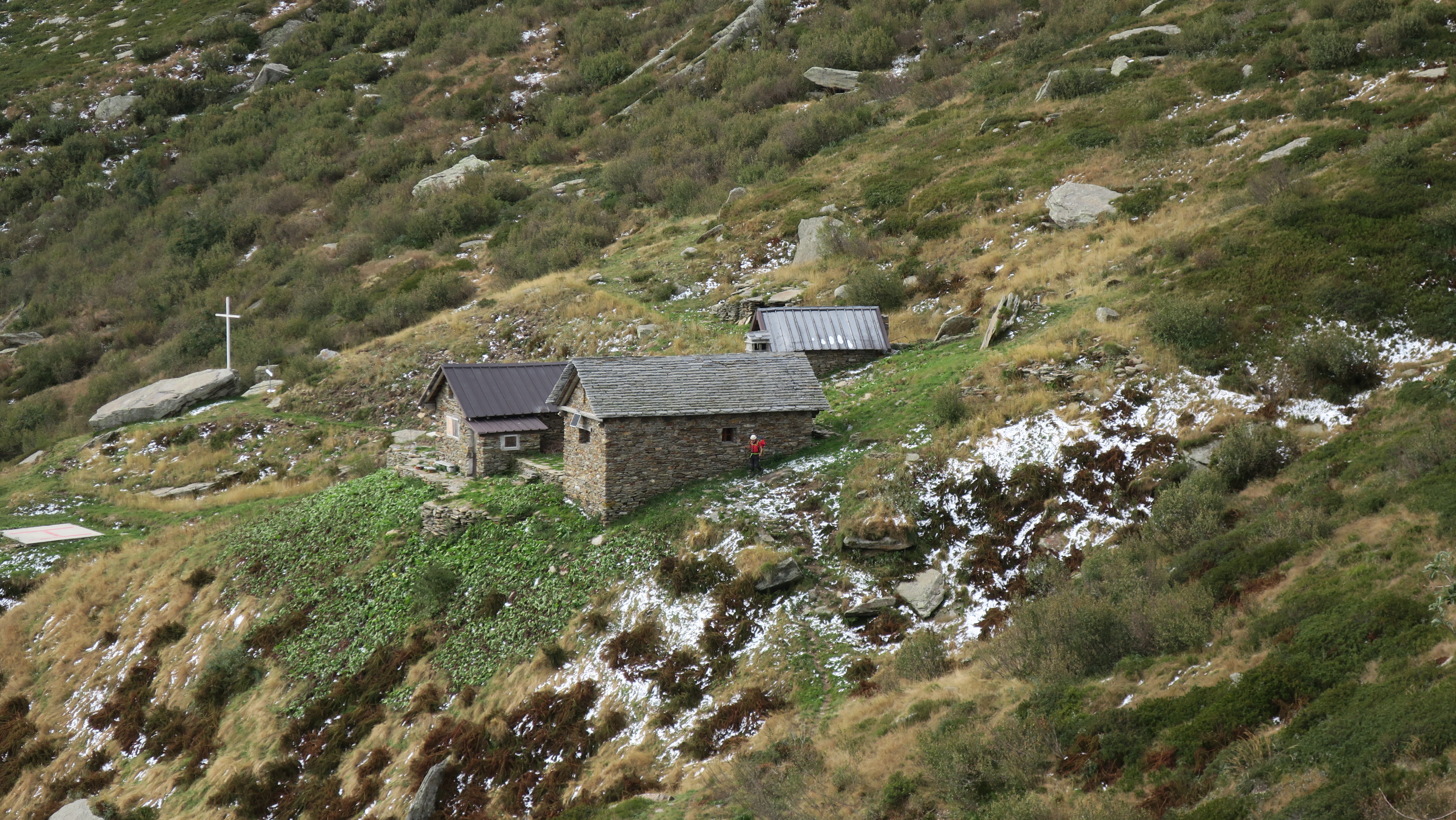
View at Bivouac Ubaldo Cavallasca "Cucciolo" - Alpe Fornà

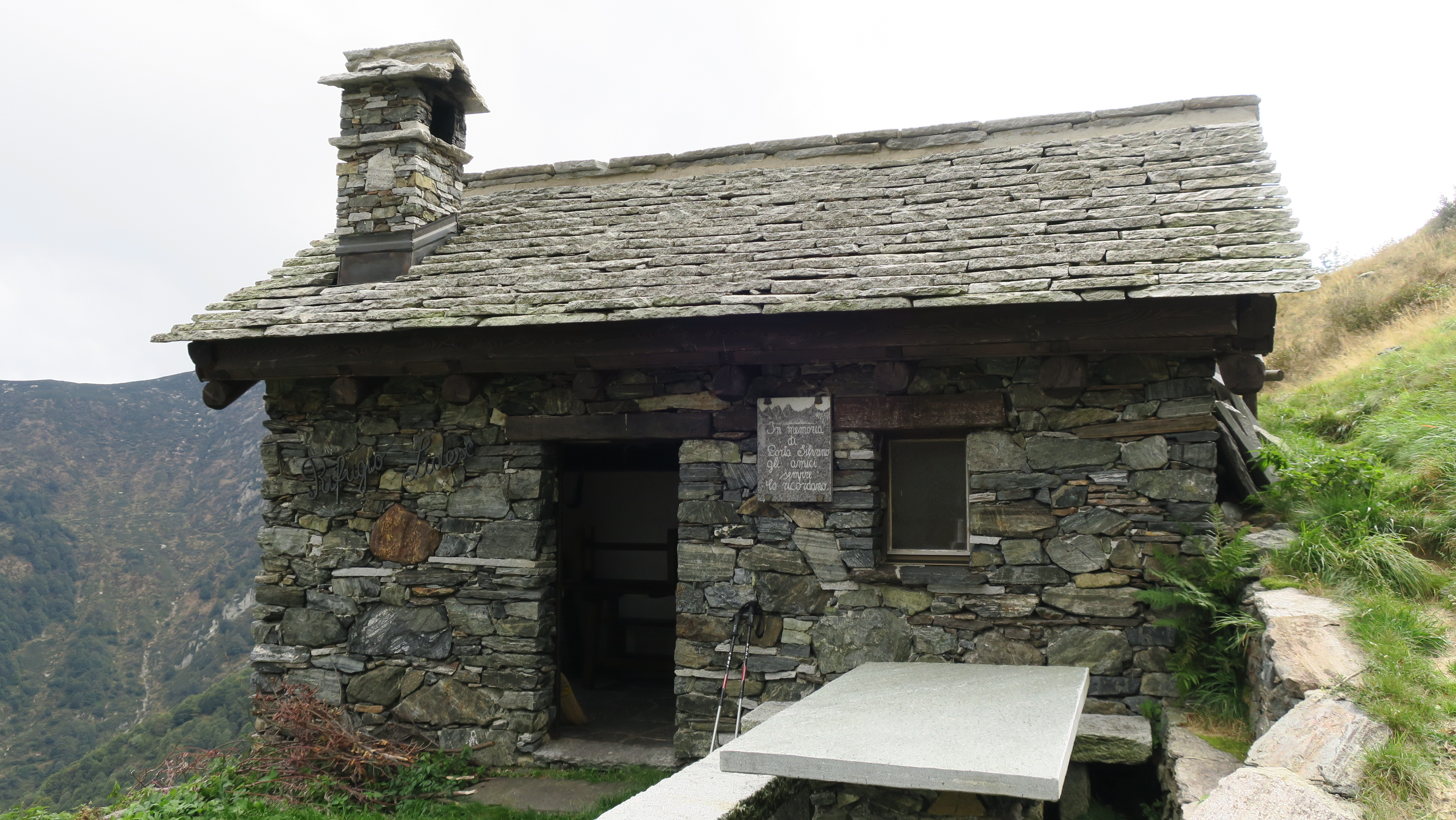
Bivouac Lidesh lying on the Bove Path

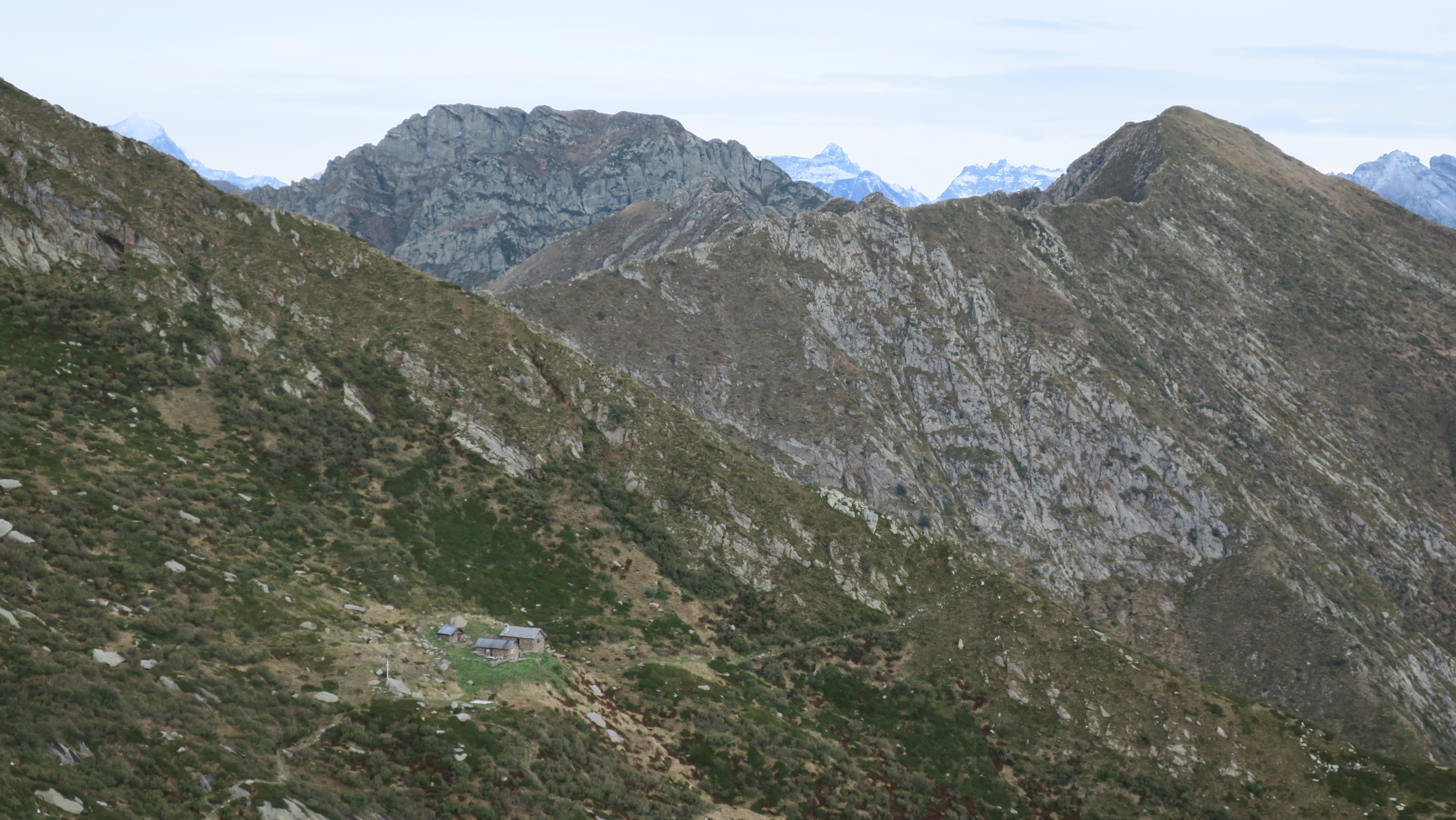
Bivouac on Alpe Fornà from Mount Zeda ridge on the Bove Path

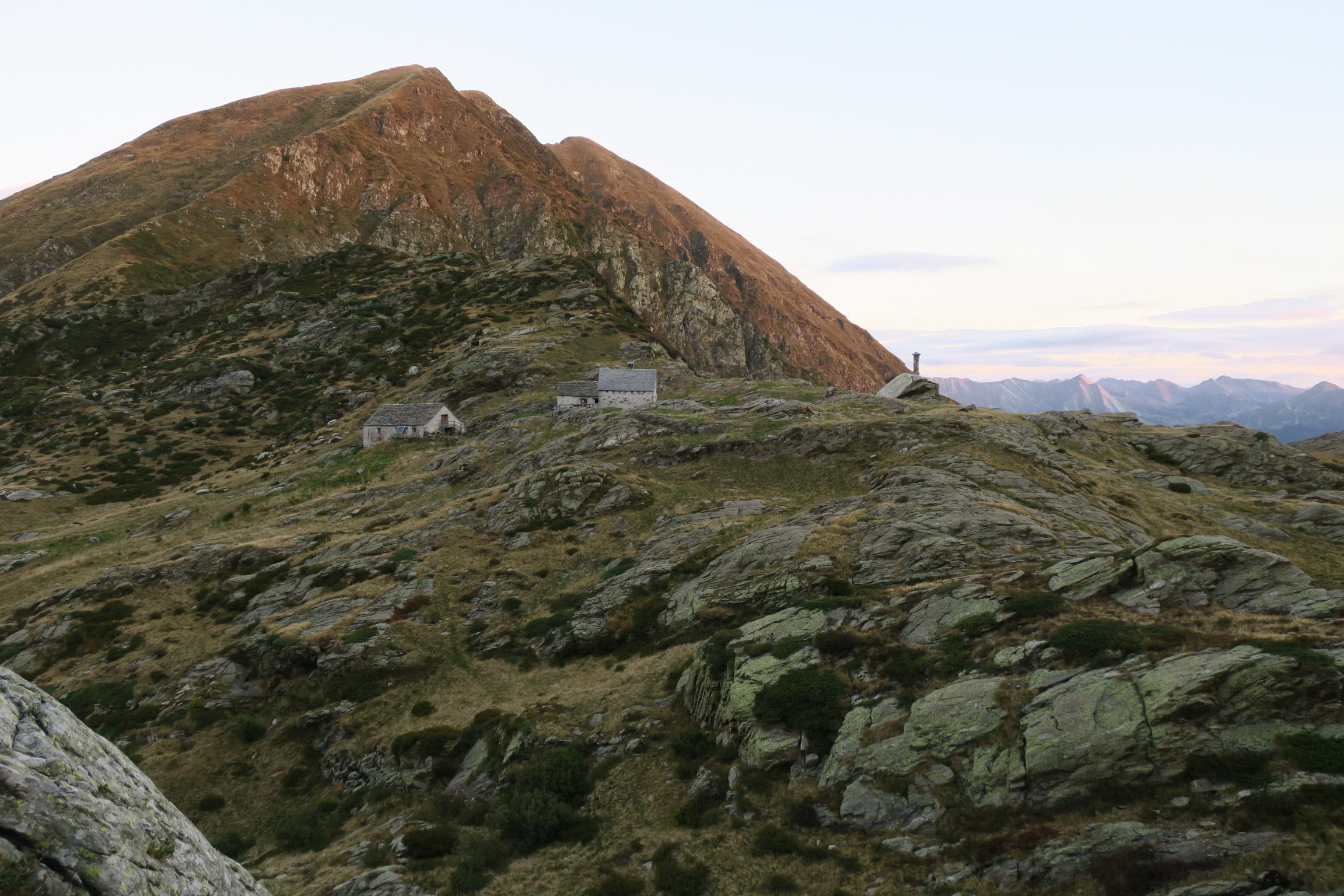
Bivouac Alpe Scredi on the Bove Path

== Geology ==
The Bove Path traverses a landscape of high geological diversity, offering insights into the Val Grande's natural history, allowing it to obtain UNESCO recognition. The trail traverses a landscape shaped by millions of years of tectonic and glacial activity, containing a variety of metamorphic rocks, fault lines, and glacial remnants. The geological heritage of the path provides physical challenges, such as steep ridges and exposed cliffs.

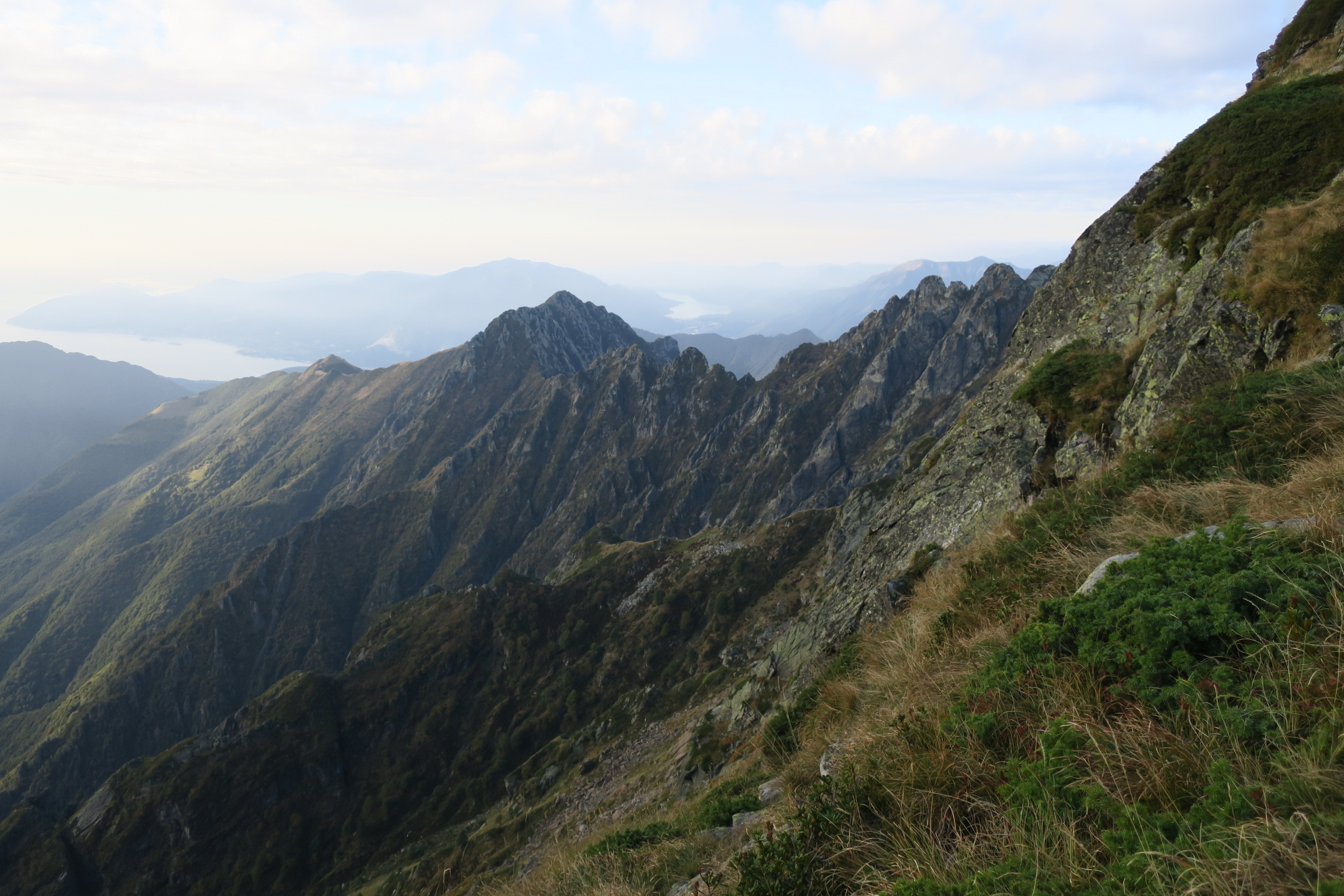
View of The Bove Path towards Corona di Ghina and Cima Sasso,Val Grande National Park, Italy

=== Metamorphic rock composition ===
The Bove Path traverses terrain primarily composed of metamorphic rocks, such as gneiss and schist, formed during the Alpine orogeny. These rocks shape the steep ridges and exposed cliffs hikers encounter along key sections of the trail, such as Monte Zeda and Torrione. The rugged landscape created by these geological processes contributes significantly to the trail's challenging nature.

Distinctive sections of the Bove Path, such as those near Monte Pedum and Monte Proman, are marked by dark rocks like amphibolites and serpentinites. These dense and durable rocks, with their greenish to black hues, contribute to the exposed terrain and sharp ridgelines that hikers navigate. These formations belong to the Ivrea-Verbano Zone, a geological area that reveals the transition between the Earth's crust and mantle.

The historical use of stone in the Val Grande region is reflected along the Bove Path, where ancient shepherd paths and dry-stone walls are still visible. While the region's Candoglia pink marble was famously used for Milan's Cathedral, the rocks found on the Bove Path have served more practical purposes, such as constructing pastoral shelters and marking trails for transhumance routes.

=== UNESCO Recognition ===
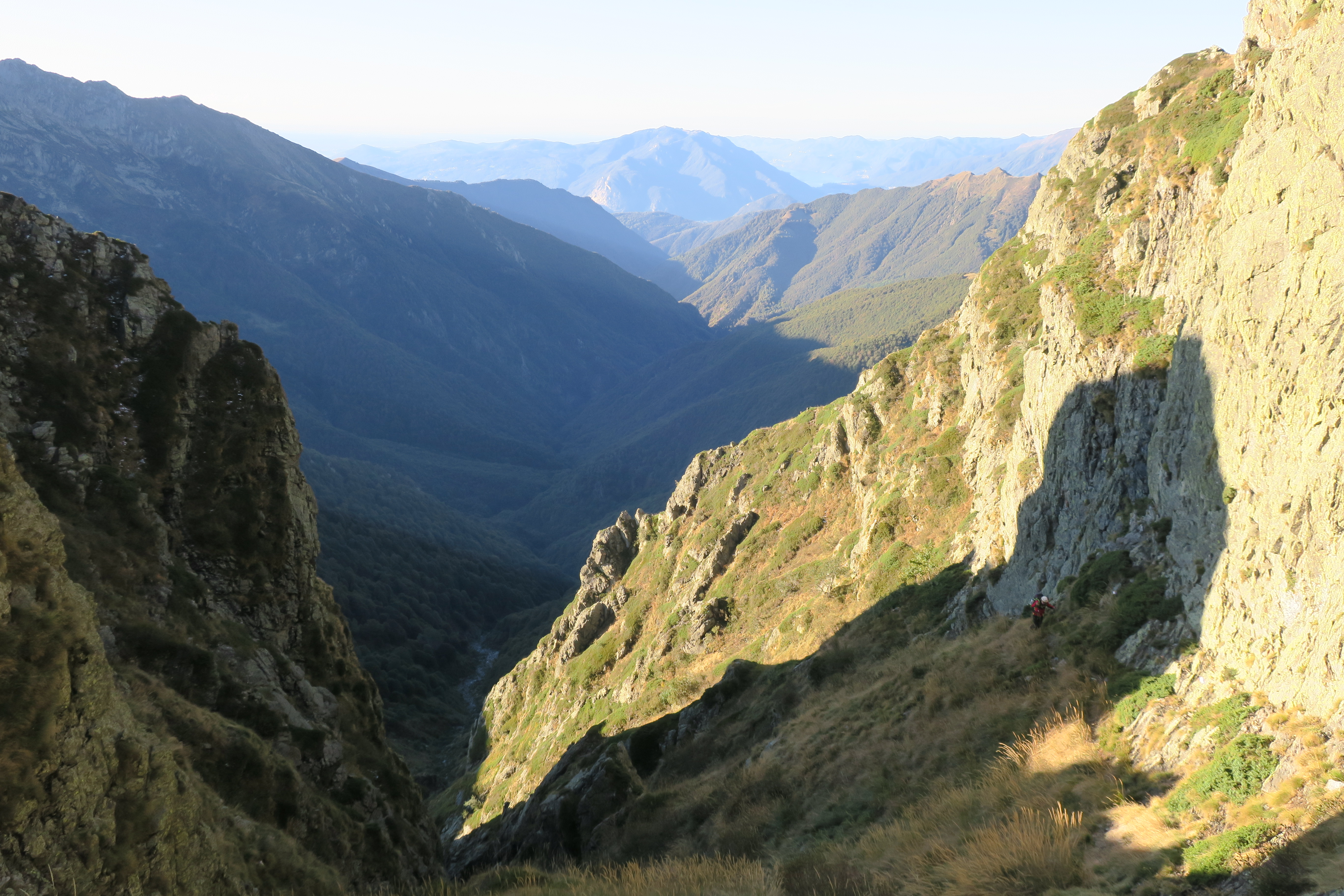
View from Monte Zeda on the Bove Path, Val Grande National Park, Italy

Sections of the Bove Path highlight the UNESCO recognized geological significance of the Val Grande region. Hikers can observe folded rock layers, fault lines, and mineral veins directly along the trail, particularly in areas like Monte Torrione. These features reflect the dynamic history of Alpine metamorphism that shaped the challenging terrain of the path.

The terrain of the Bove Path was significantly shaped by glacial activity during the Last Glacial Maximum. Prominent features such as cirques and moraines are evident along the trail, particularly in the vicinity of Bocchetta di Campo. These landforms serve as visible remnants of the region's glacial history, offering hikers insights into the geological processes that shaped the landscape.

Environmental conservation efforts have been integral to maintaining the Bove Path and the surrounding Val Grande National Park. Initiatives include habitat restoration projects, the introduction of educational trails, and stricter regulations to prevent littering and vandalism. These efforts ensure that the region's unique ecosystems, from alpine meadows to ancient forests, remain undisturbed for future generations.

== Biodiversity ==
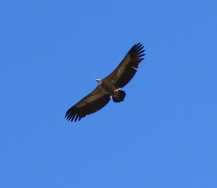
Griffin from Monte Torrione on the Bove Path

Val Grande National Park boasts a varied flora, supported by its diverse environments and the moderating influence of Lake Maggiore. These range from humid valley floors to high alpine peaks, offering hikers the opportunity to witness much of this biodiversity along the path.

In the lower valley, mixed forests of broadleaf trees dominate, with chestnuts being the most prevalent species. Higher up, the landscape changes dramatically, with vast beech forests covering humid, sheltered slopes. In some areas, like Alpe Boschelli, you can find centuries-old trees that have survived natural events.

Along the Bove Path, the gorges host specialized vegetation, including yew, alder, and maple trees clinging to rocky walls, while alpine meadows along the route burst with blooms such as alpine Columbine, mountain arnica, and yellow gentian. Wetlands near areas like Alpe Scaredi enrich the biodiversity of the trail, providing habitats for rare species including the alpine tulip, cottongrass, wild orchids like the spotted and military orchids, and carnivorous plants such as the round-leaved sundew. This exceptional diversity underscores the Bove Path as a vital corridor for rare and protected species unique to the Alps.

The flora along the Bove Path reflects the region's dynamic interaction between nature and human activity. Traditional agricultural practices, forestry exploitation, and increasing tourism have shaped plant communities and their distribution over time. However, the establishment of the park has introduced conservation strategies to preserve and restore the unique plant biodiversity found along the trail, ensuring the protection of its ecological heritage for future generations. The flora along the Bove Path stands as a testament to nature's resilience and adaptability, highlighting the importance of safeguarding this biodiversity for future exploration and appreciation.

Val Grande National Park is also home to numerous protected species, making it a site of interest for academics and experts studying natural evolution following human exploitation. This has led to the recognition of species of European significance. In 2013, the European Union's LIFE programme launched a five-year project aimed at supporting environmental and climate action initiatives.

The park hosts around 138 bird species, including notable ones such as the golden eagle, peregrine falcon, and various woodpeckers. Along the trail, hikers may encounter herbivores like chamois and deer, as well as carnivores such as foxes and badgers. In recent years, there have also been sightings of wolves and bears in the area. Reptiles, including various species of vipers and lizards, can also be encountered along the path.

== Gallery ==
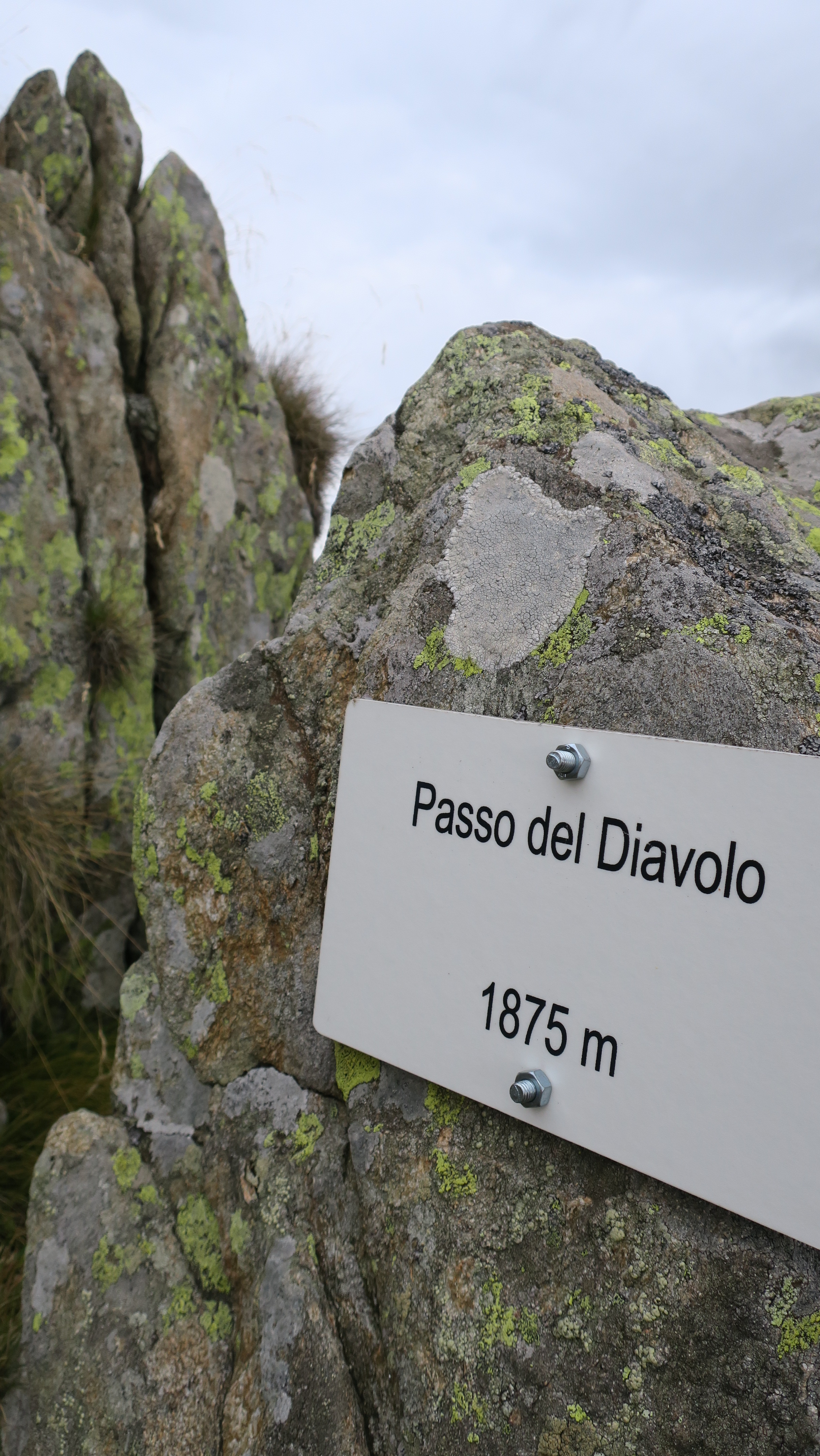
Devil's Pass between Monte Todano, Pian Cavallone and Pizzo Marona

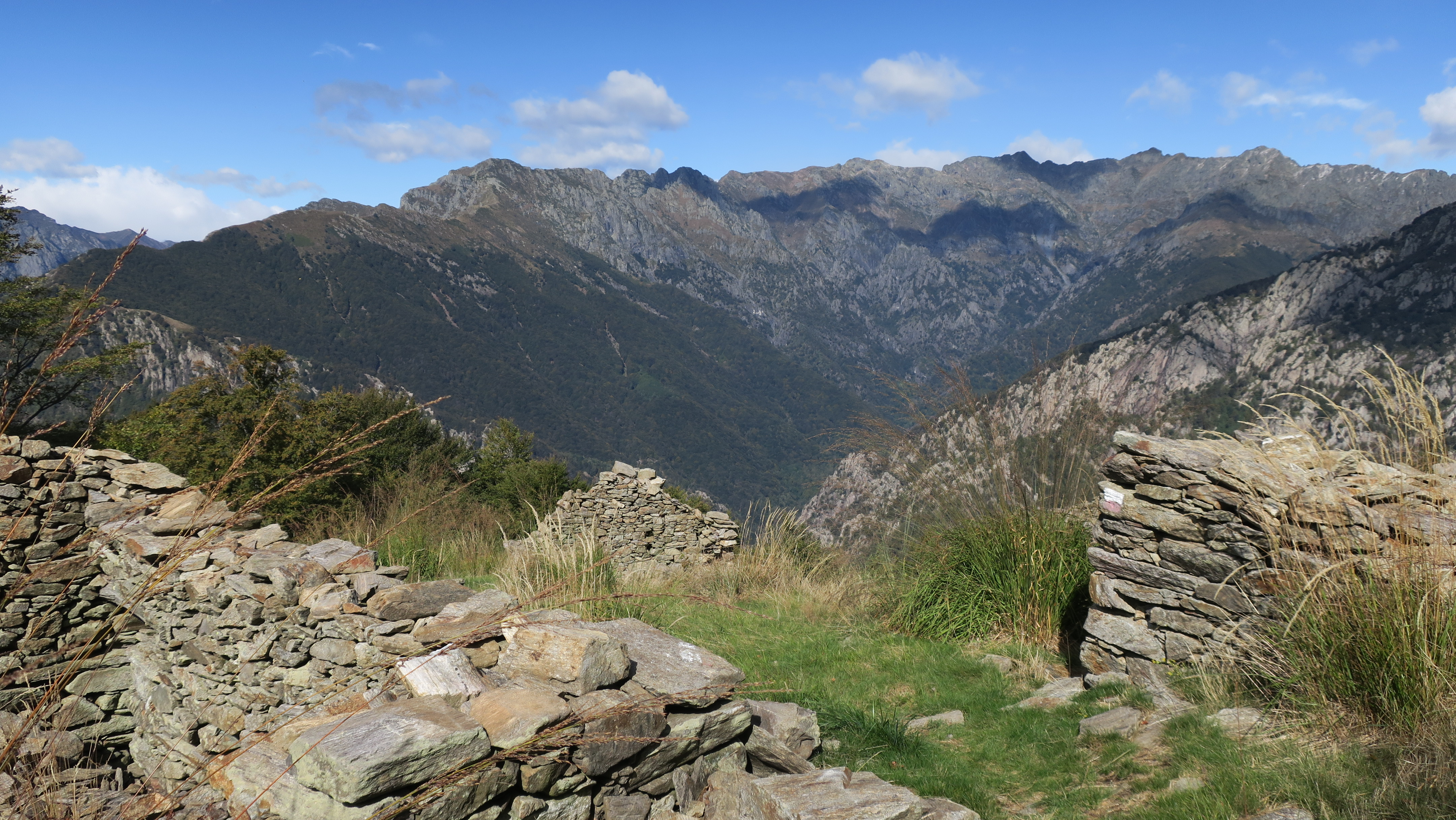
View on the Bove Path from Monte Curgei looking at Cima Sasso

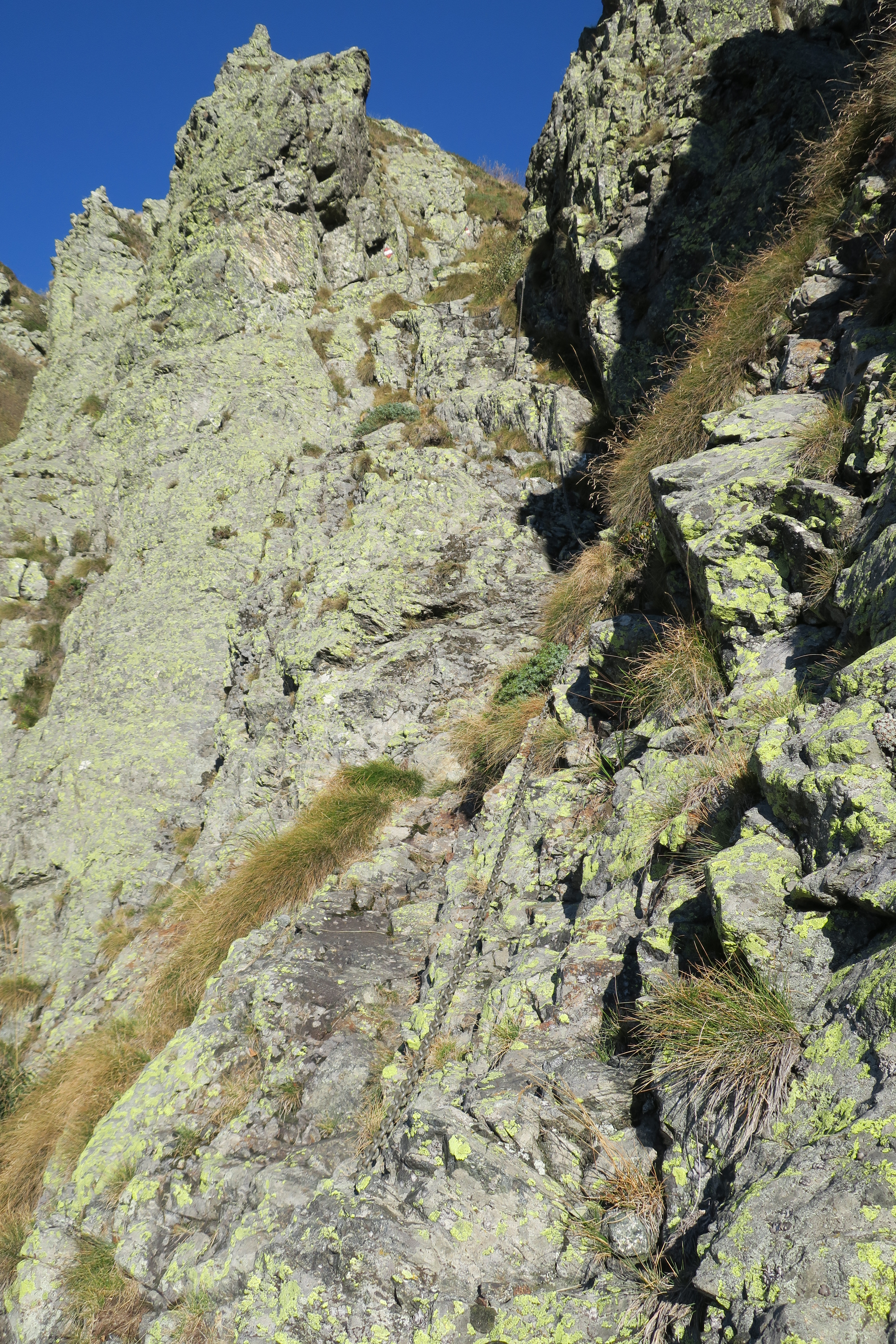
Section of ferrata on the Bove Path

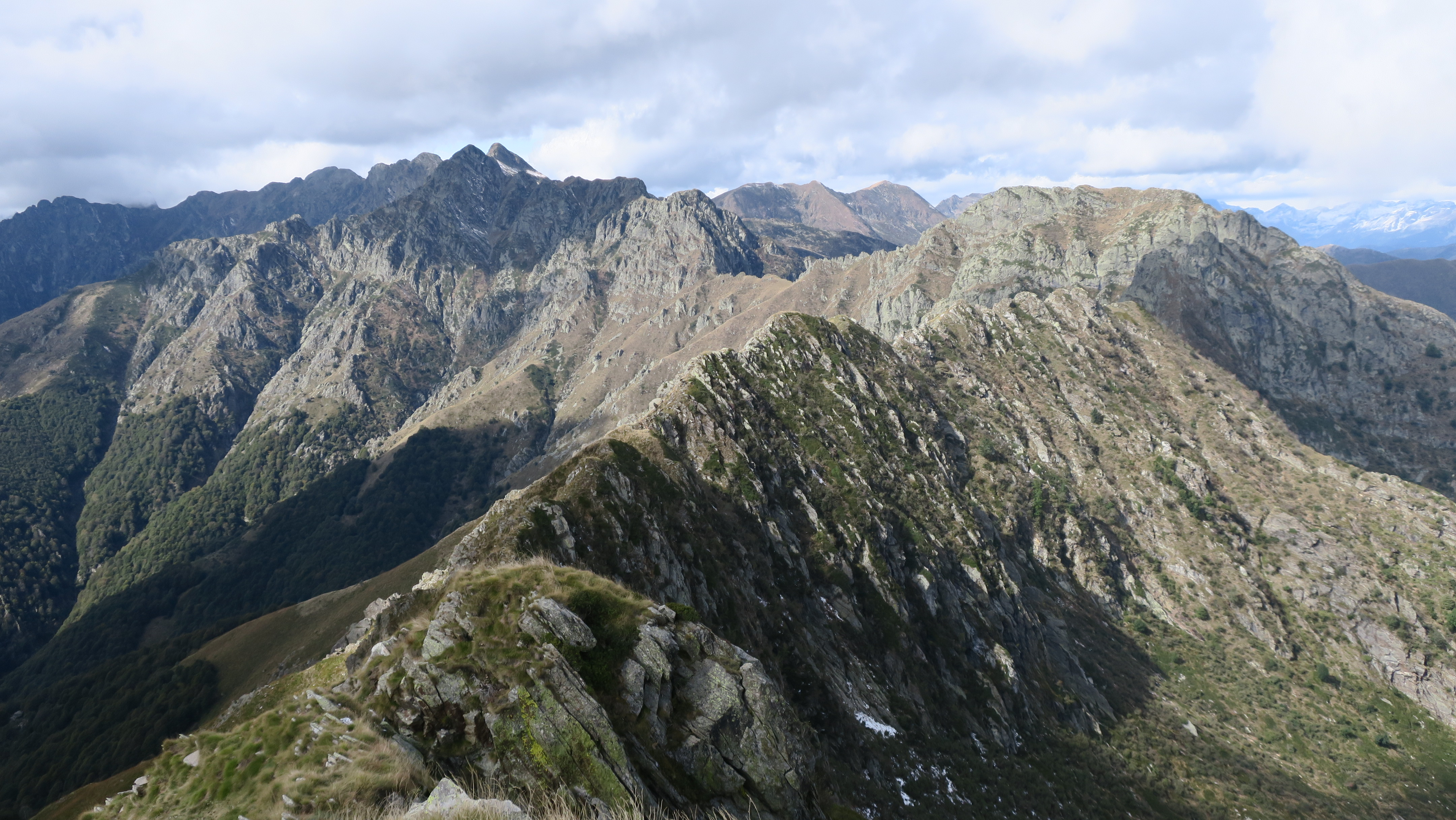
On the ridge of the Bove Path from Monte Zeda towards Monte Piota

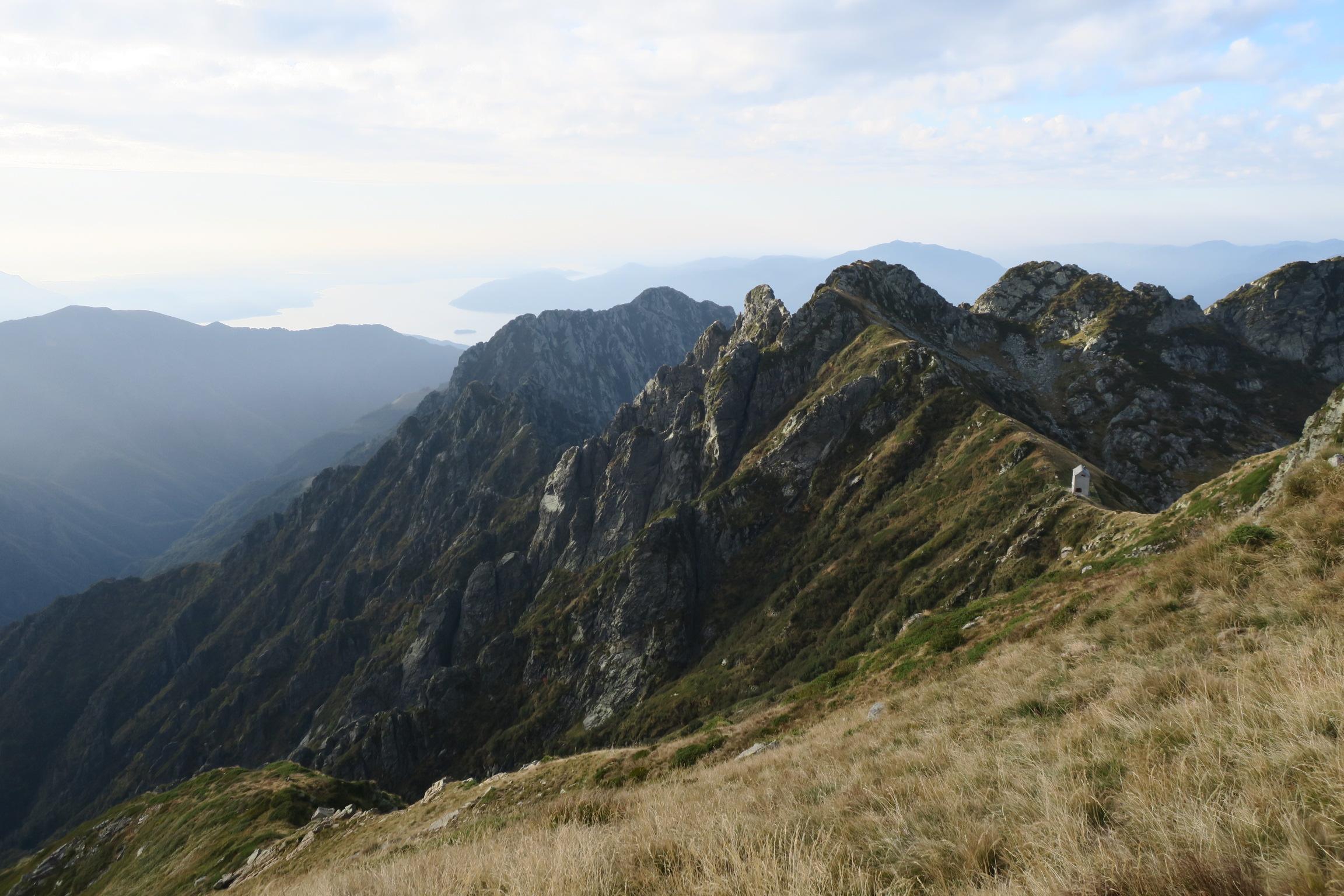
View from the Bove Path towards Bivouac Bocchette di Campo
