= Pizzo Proman =

Mountain in Italy

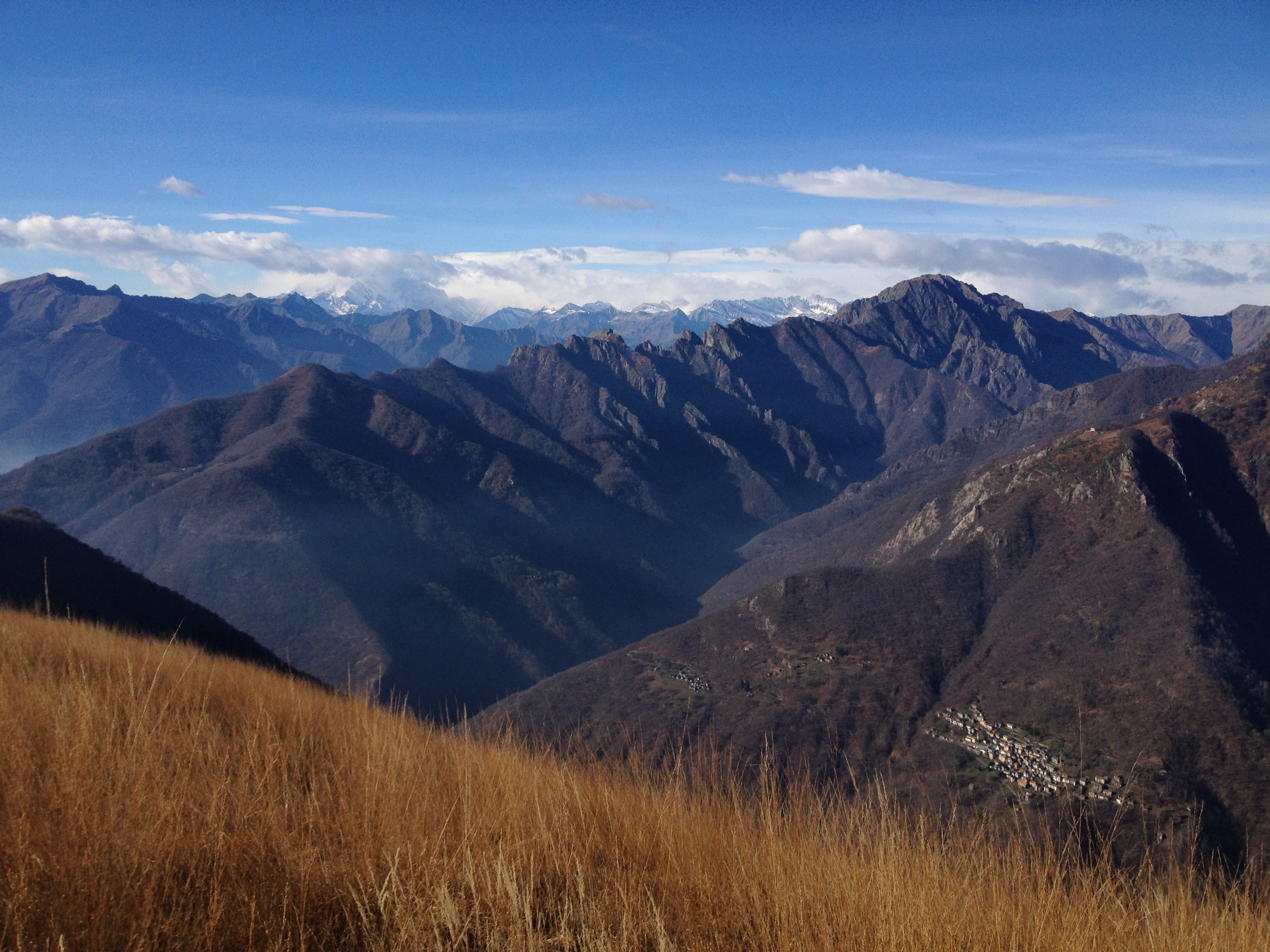
- Pizzo Proman seen from Pizzo Pernice

Highest point
- Elevation: 2,098 m (6,883 ft)
- Prominence: 378 m (1,240 ft)

Geography
- Location: Piedmont, Italy
- Parent range: Lepontine Alps

Pizzo Proman is a mountain of Piedmont, Italy, with an elevation of 2,098 metres (6,883 ft). It is located in the Lepontine Alps, in the Province of Verbano-Cusio-Ossola.

== Background ==
The mountain is located between the Val Grande and the Val d'Ossola, and lies within the borders of the Val Grande National Park, in the territory of the municipalities of Premosello Chiovenda and San Bernardino Verbano.

An observation post was built on the peak in 1916 as part of the Cadorna Line.

Its peak can be reached on foot from both the Val d'Ossola (starting from Colloro, a hamlet of Premosello Chiovenda) and the Val Grande.
