= Val Grande National Park =

National park in Italy

Parco Nazionale della Val Grande
- Val Grande National Park
- IUCN category II (national park)
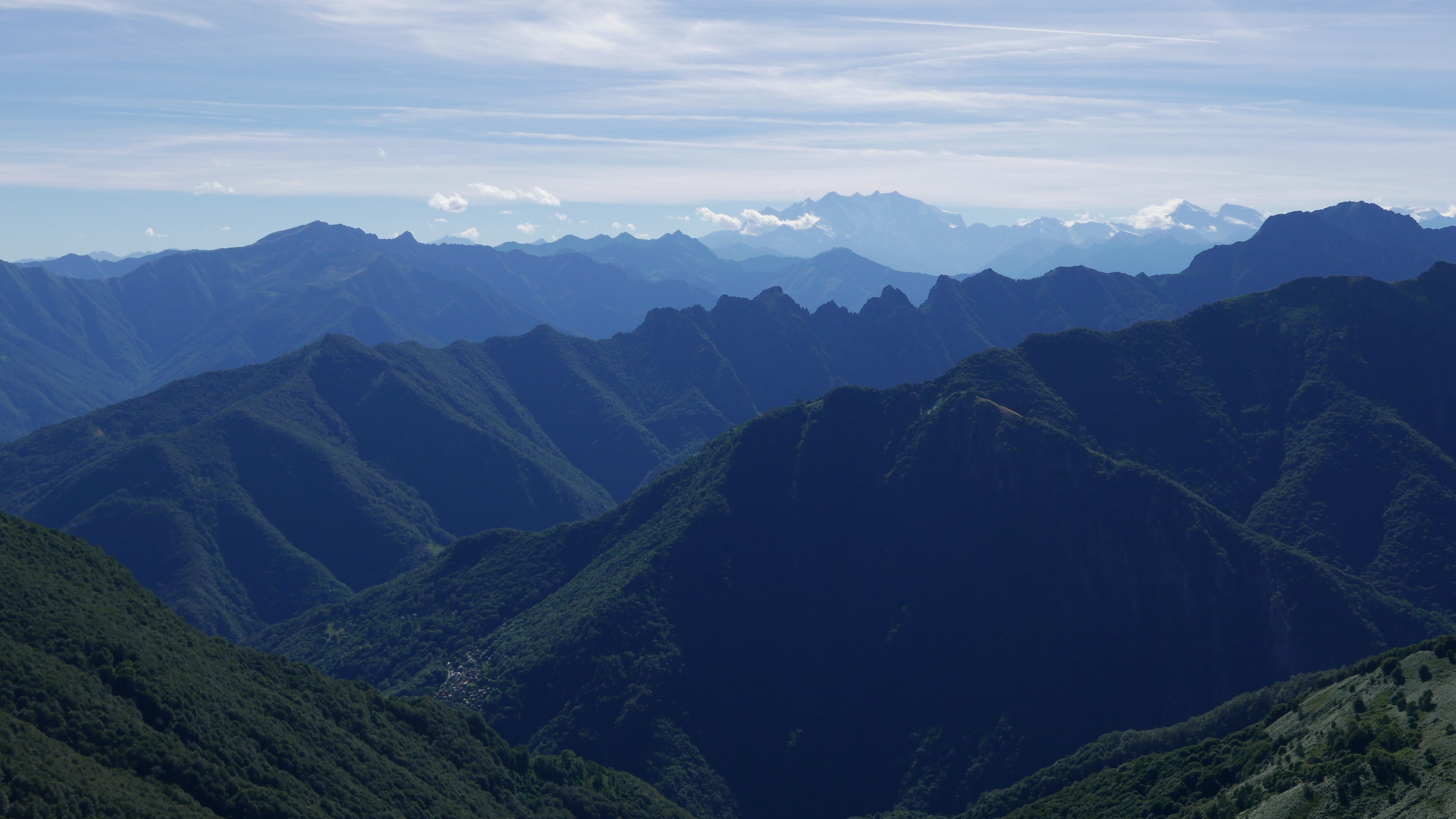
- The view on the park from Pian Cavallone

- Location within Italy
- Location: Piedmont
- Coordinates: 46°1′48″N 8°27′0″E
- Area: 170 km^{2} (66 sq mi)
- Established: 1992
- Governing body: Ministero dell'Ambiente
- Website: www.parcovalgrande.it

Val Grande National Park (Italian: Parco Nazionale della Val Grande) is a protected area located in Piedmont, in the north of Italy. It is most notable for landscapes of the High Alps.

== Geography ==
The park is located in Province of Verbano-Cusio-Ossola and is shared between ten municipalities: Aurano, Beura-Cardezza, Caprezzo, Cossogno, Valle Cannobina, Intragna, Malesco, Miazzina, Premosello-Chiovenda, San Bernardino Verbano, Santa Maria Maggiore, Trontano, and Vogogna.

The park lies entirely in the drainage basin of the Po River. It is located between the valley of Vigezzo in the north, the Cannobina valley in the northwest, the valley of Ossola in the southwest, and Lake Maggiore in the southeast. The park is not populated and is often described as "the largest wilderness in the Alps".

Val Grande and Val Pogallo, two principal valleys inside the park, with the former running southeast and the latter running south, feed the two major rivers in the park. These valleys join into Torrente San Bernardino, a tributary of Lake Maggiore. The majority of the area of the park is forested.

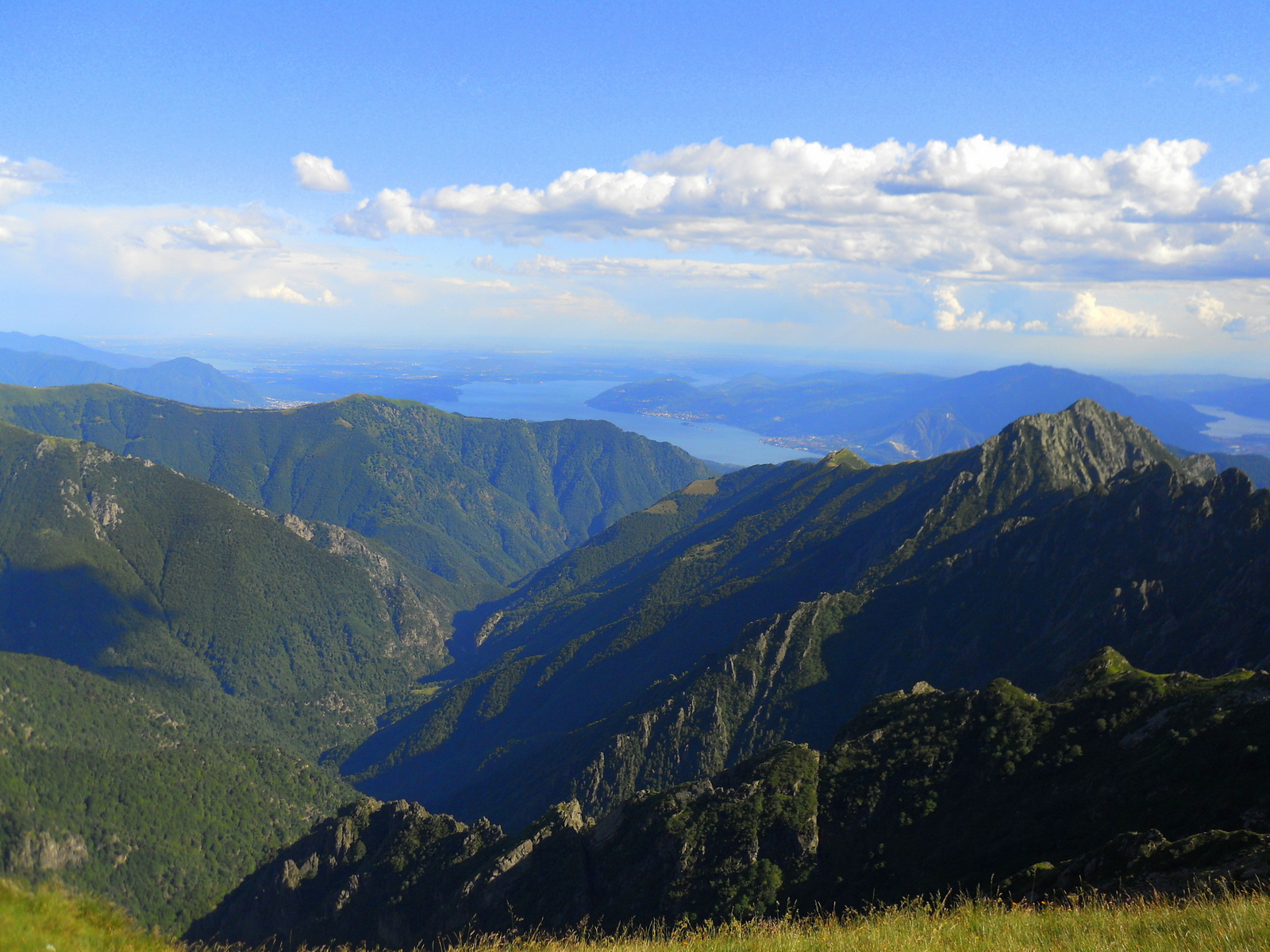
Val Grande and Lake Maggiore seen from Bocchetta di Scaredi

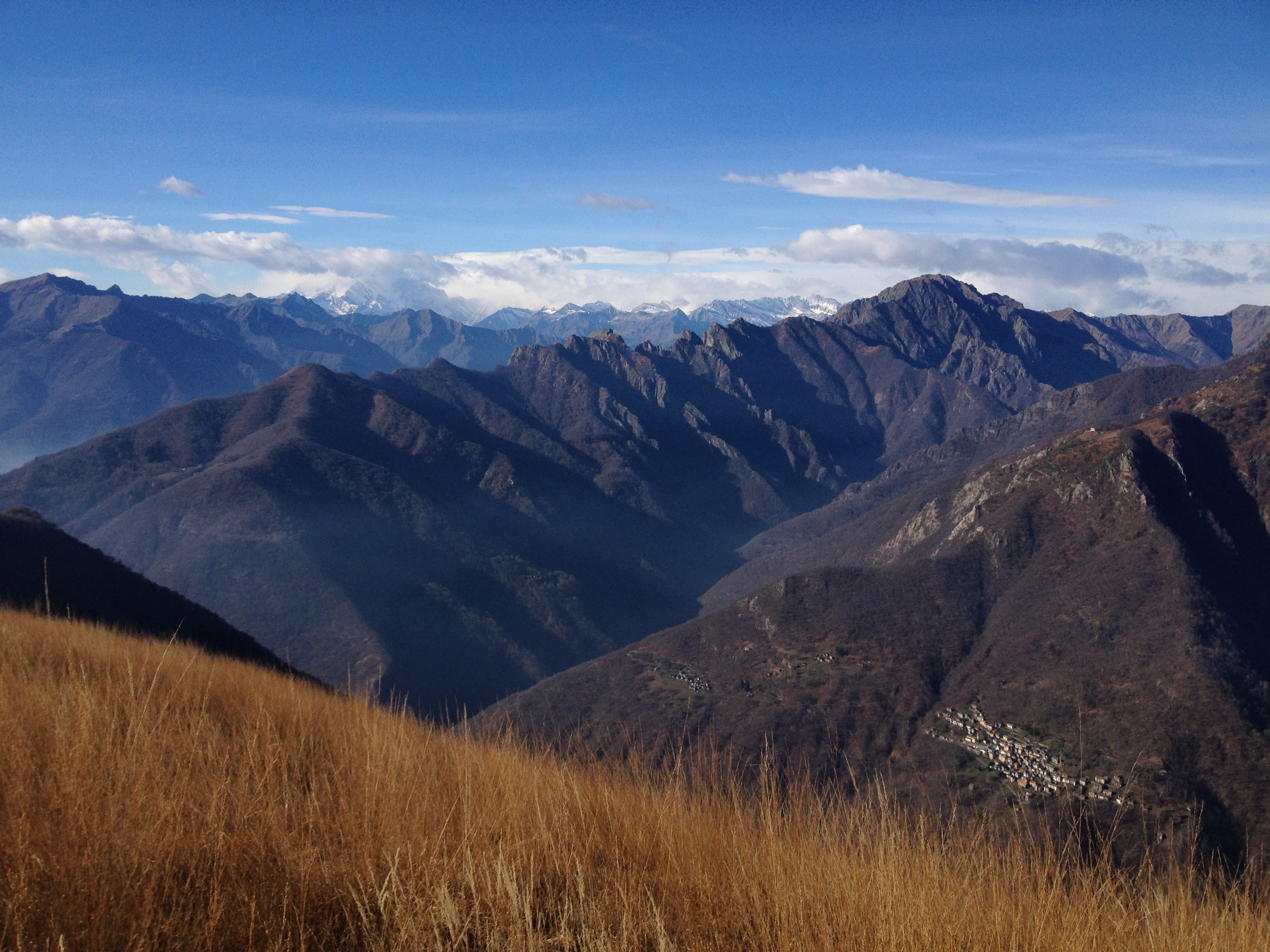
Val Grande, Pizzo Proman (the taller mountain on the right), Cicogna (the small village on the bottom-right corner) and Monte Rosa (left, covered by clouds), seen from Pizzo Pernice

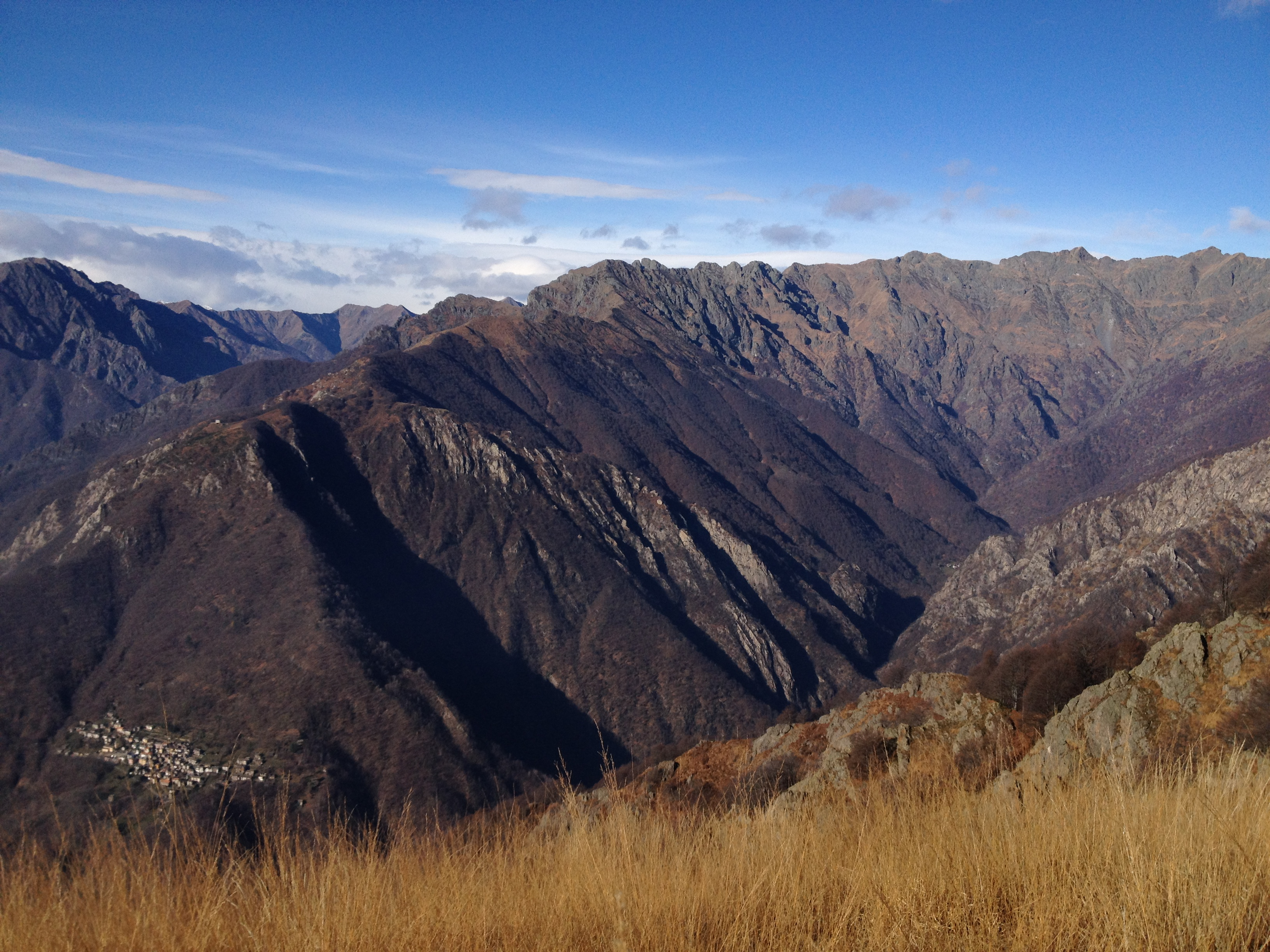
Val Pogallo, Cicogna, Cima Pedum and Cima della Laurasca, seen from Pizzo Pernice
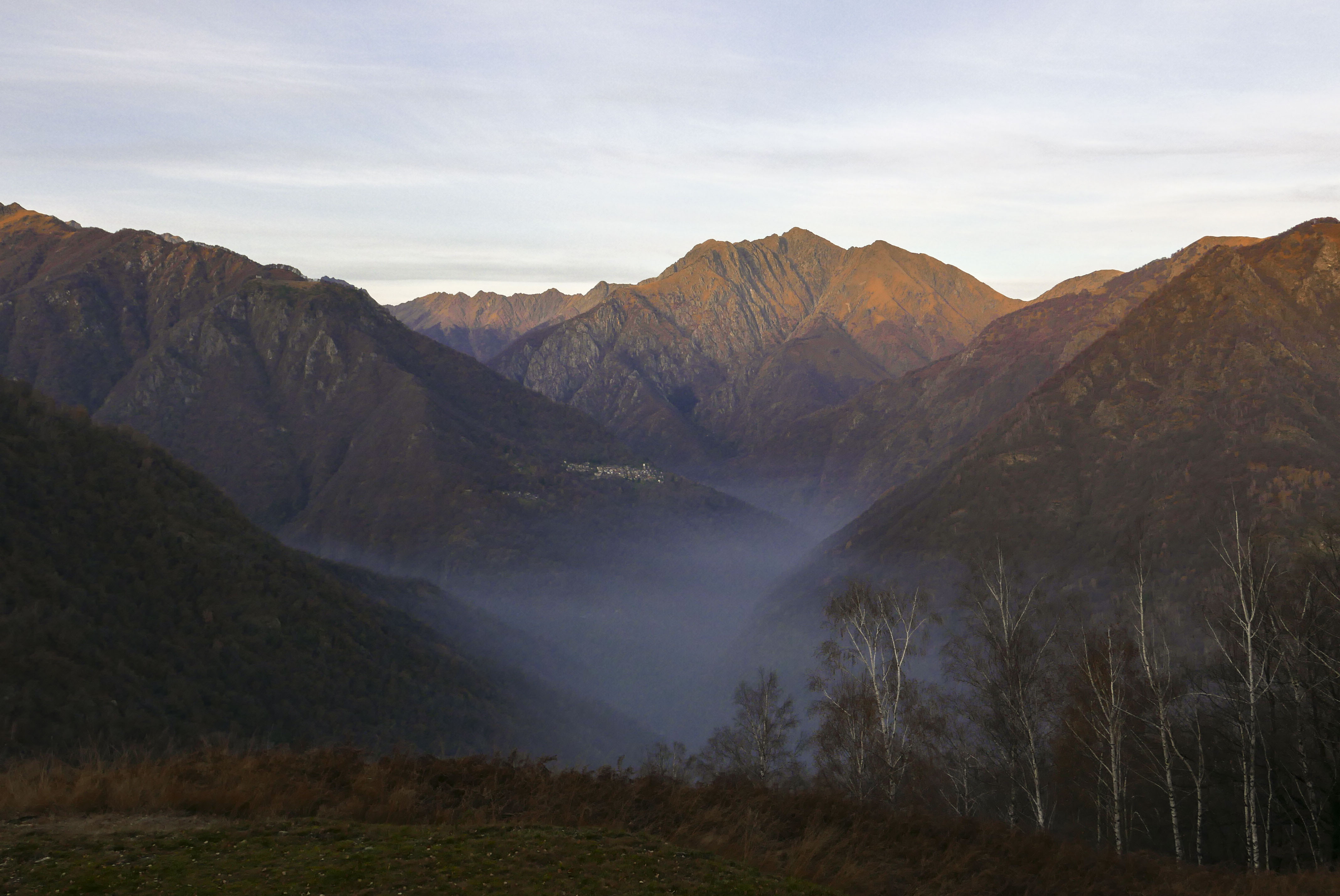
Val Pogallo, Cicogna and Monte Zeda (center), seen from the road to Ompio

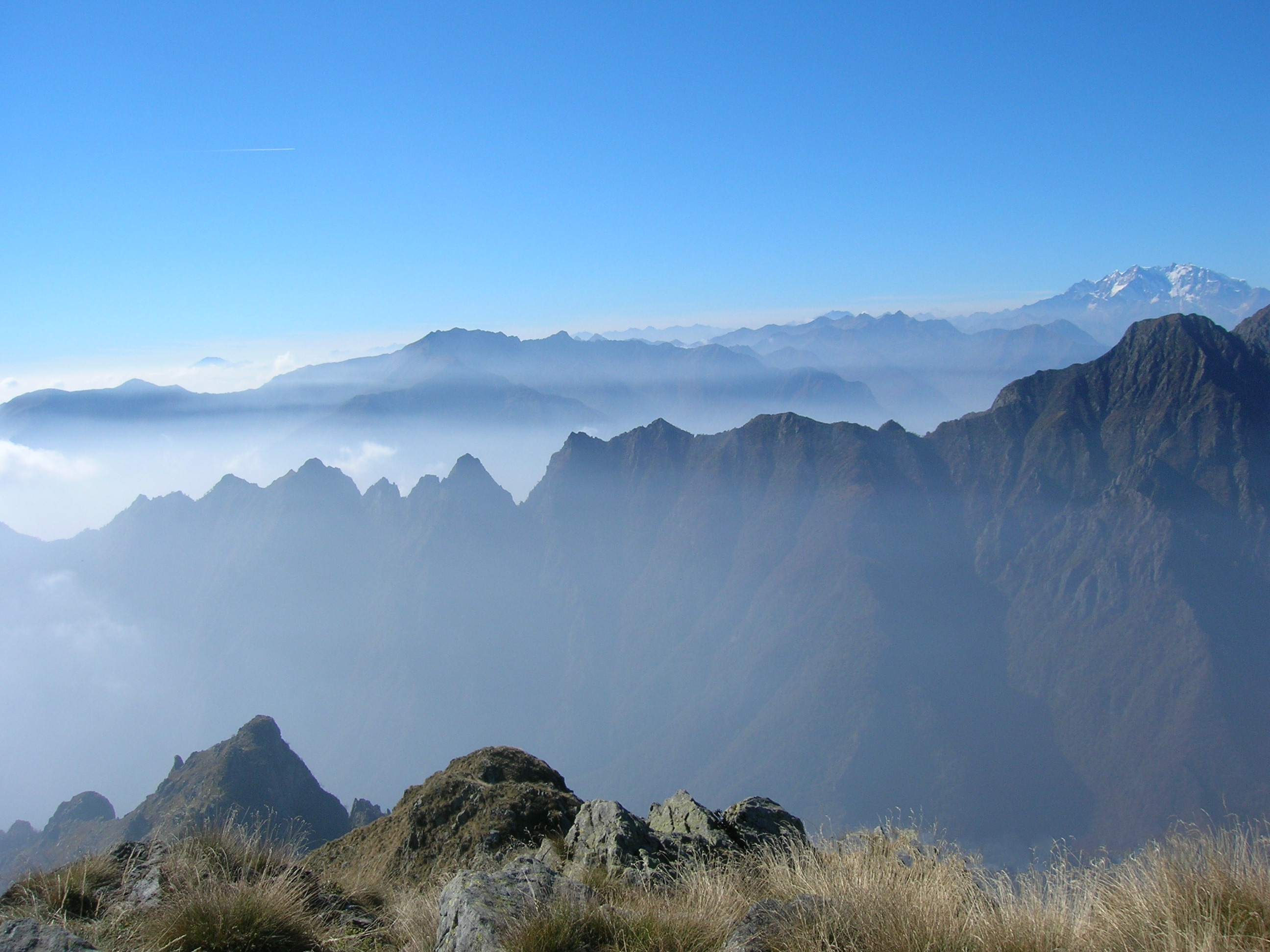
Corni di Nibbio and Monte Rosa, seen from Cima Sasso (1916m)

== History ==
Shepherds populated Val Grande since at least the 13th century, and the timber production was active since the 15th century. However, at the end of World War II all population left the area, following the actions of German troops against the Italian resistance in the area in June 1944. The idea to create a national park in Val Grande dates back to 1953. In 1967, the area was designated a Strict Nature Reserve and became the first conservation area with this status in the Italian Alps. In 1974, the Association Italia Nostra developed a detailed plan to establish a national park, and, in the 1980s, the preparation started. The park was established on March 2, 1992. On June 24, 1998 the area of the park was extended. On 18 July 2023 the park was further expanded to include three additional comuni (Mergozzo, Ornavasso and Verbania), bringing its total area to 170.21 km².

== Tourism ==
As of 2012, the park had three visitor centers (located in Santa Maria Maggiore, Cossogno, and Premosello-Chiovenda), two museums, and a number of nature itineraries, which should be followed accompanied by a guide. The park is also frequently visited for its hiking trails, such as the Bove Path.
