= Monte Zeda =

Mountain in Italy

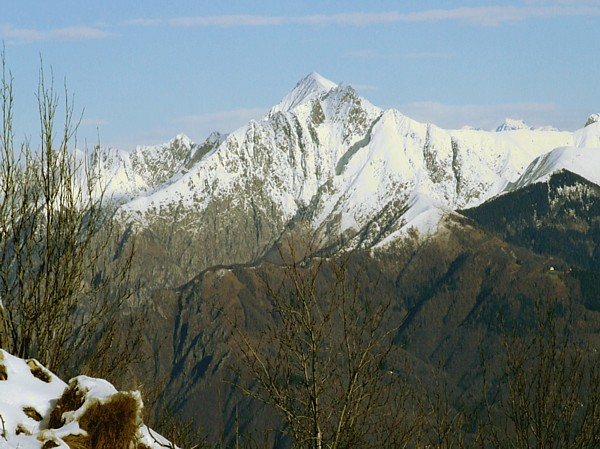

Highest point
- Elevation: 2,156 m (7,073 ft)
- Prominence: 374 m (1,227 ft)
- Isolation: 10.8 km (6.7 mi)
- Listing: Alpine mountains 2000-2499 m
- Coordinates: 46°02′42″N 8°32′09″E

Geography
- Location within Alps
- Location: Piedmont, Italy
- Parent range: Lepontine Alps

Climbing
- Easiest route: hiking

The Monte Zeda is a mountain in the Lepontine Alps belonging to the Province of Verbano-Cusio-Ossola (Italy).

== Geography ==
The mountain is located in Piedmont (Provincia del Verbano-Cusio-Ossola), between two Alpine valleys: Val Grande and Val Cannobina. Its summit is a tripoint at which the borders of the municipalities of Miazzina, Aurano and Valle Cannobina meet. Along with Cima della Laurasca is the highest summit of the surrounding area. On the summit, which offers a very wide view on the surrounding mountain, stands a cross bearing a box sheltering a summit register.

=== SOIUSA classification ===
According to SOIUSA (International Standardized Mountain Subdivision of the Alps) the mountain can be classified in the following way:

- main part = Western Alps
- major sector = North Western Alps
- section = Lepontine Alps
- subsection = South-western Lepontine Alps ((in Italian) Alpi Ticinesi e del Verbano)
- supergroup = Catena Togano-Laurasca-Limidario
- group = Gruppo Zeda-Laurasca
- subgroup = Gruppo dello Zeda
- code = I/B-10.II-C.7.b

== Access to the summit ==
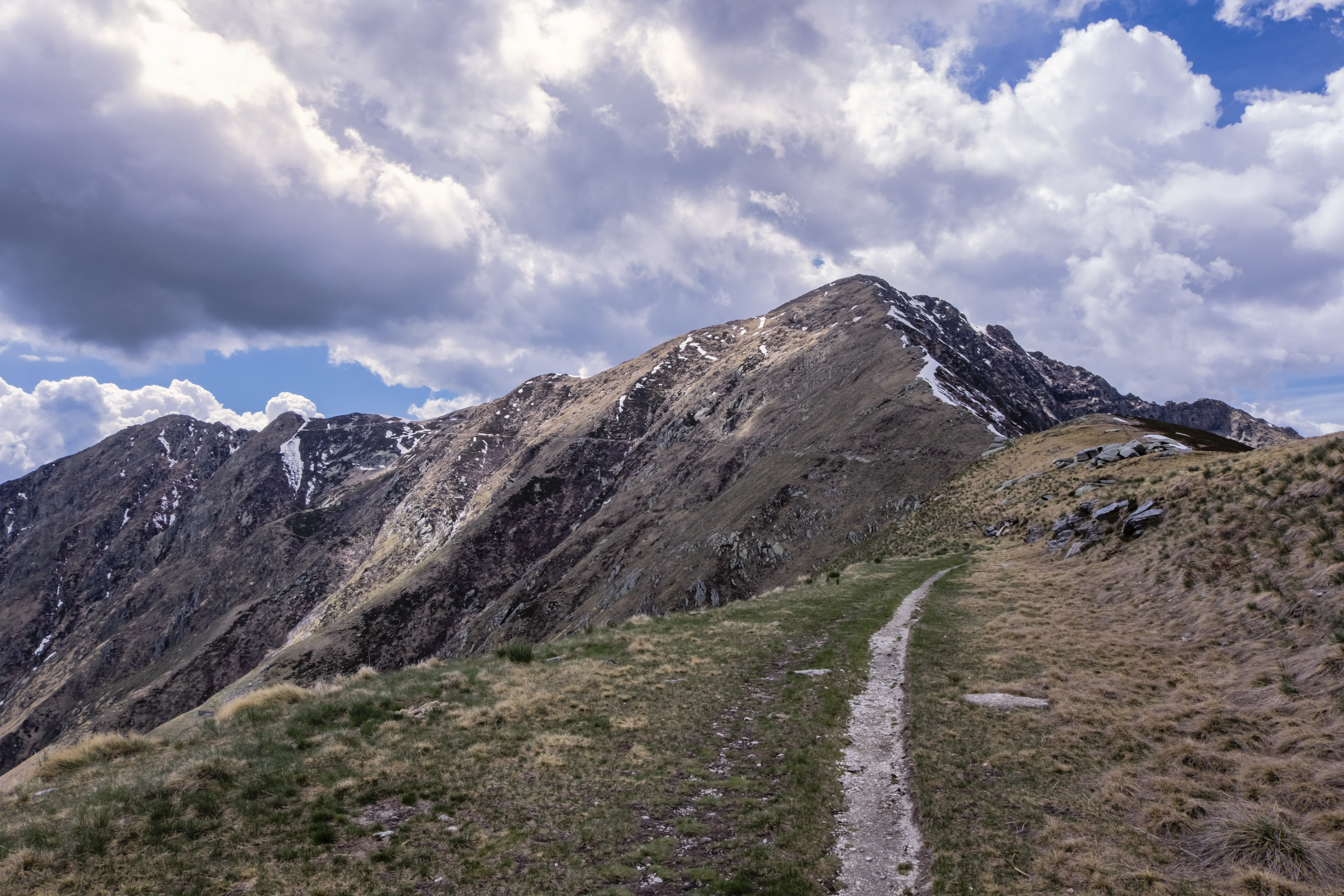
Footpath to Monte Zeda

Reaching the summit of Monte Zeda does not require alpinistic skill. It can be accessed starting from Premeno through Alpe Manegra, Piancavallo and, later, "Passo Folungo" (a mountain pass at 1,369 m) and Alpe Archia. Another route to Monte Zeda starts from Falmenta and takes about 5 hours walking.

== Nature conservation ==
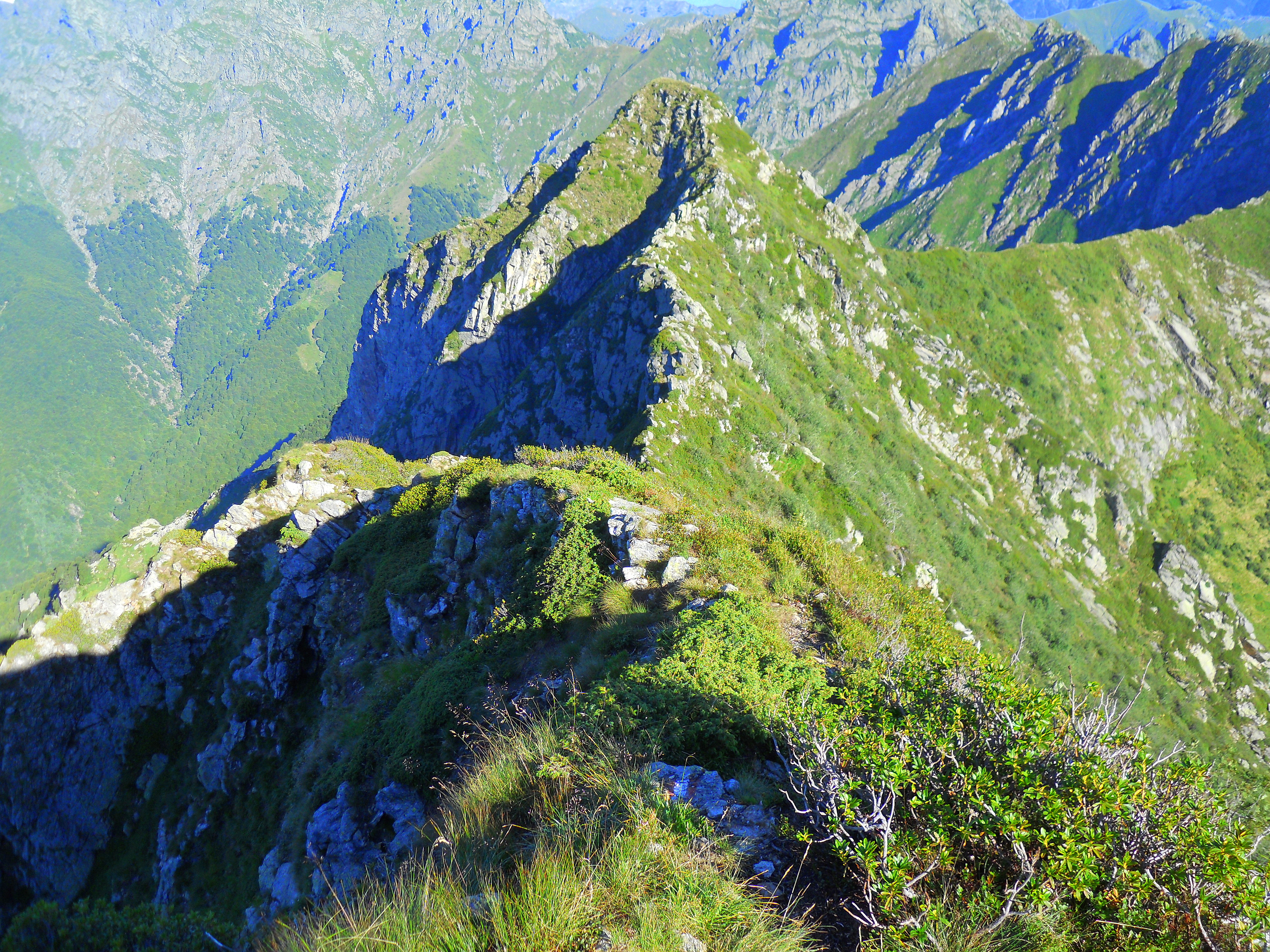
North ridge of the Zeda

The Southern and Western slopes of the mountain are included in the Val Grande National Park.

== Mountain huts ==
- Rifugio Pian Cavallone

== Maps ==
- Italian official cartography (Istituto Geografico Militare - IGM); on-line version: www.pcn.minambiente.it
- Istituto Geografico Centrale - Carta dei sentieri e dei rifugi scala 1:50.000 n. 12 Laghi Maggiore, d'Orta e di Varese
