= Carlo Sutermeister =

Swiss engineer and businessman (1847–1918)

Karl Konrad "Carlo" Sutermeister (15 July 1847 - 12 December 1918) was a Swiss engineer and timber businessman, and co-founder of the Banco Popolare di Intra. In 1890 he constructed Italy's first hydropower plant with AC transmission in Cossogno.
