= Beura-Cardezza =

- Comune
- Comune di Beura-Cardezza
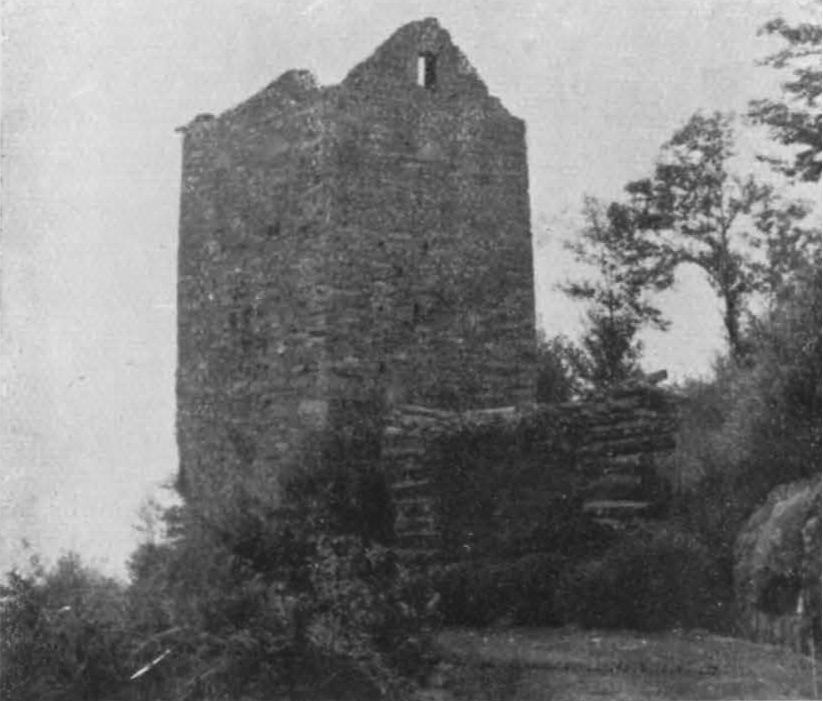
- Watchtower in the comune of Beura-Cardezza.

- Location within Italy Location within Piedmont
- Coordinates: 46°5′N 8°18′E
- Country: Italy
- Region: Piedmont
- Province: Verbano-Cusio-Ossola (VB)

Government
  - Mayor: Davide Carigi

Area
  - Total: 28.9 km^{2} (11.2 sq mi)
- Elevation: 257 m (843 ft)

Population (28 February 2017)
  - Total: 1,479
  - Density: 51.2/km^{2} (133/sq mi)
- Demonym: Beuresi
- Time zone: UTC+1 (CET)
  - Summer (DST): UTC+2 (CEST)
- Postal code: 28851
- Dialing code: 0324
- Website: Official website

Beura-Cardezza is a comune (municipality) in the Province of Verbano-Cusio-Ossola in the Italian region Piedmont, located about 120 kilometres (75 mi) northeast of Turin and about 25 kilometres (16 mi) northwest of Verbania.

Beura-Cardezza borders the following municipalities: Domodossola, Pallanzeno, Premosello-Chiovenda, Trontano, Villadossola, Vogogna. Its territory is included in the National Park of Val Grande.

== See also ==
- Beola: A type of stone named after Beura
