= Vogogna =

- Comune
- Comune di Vogogna
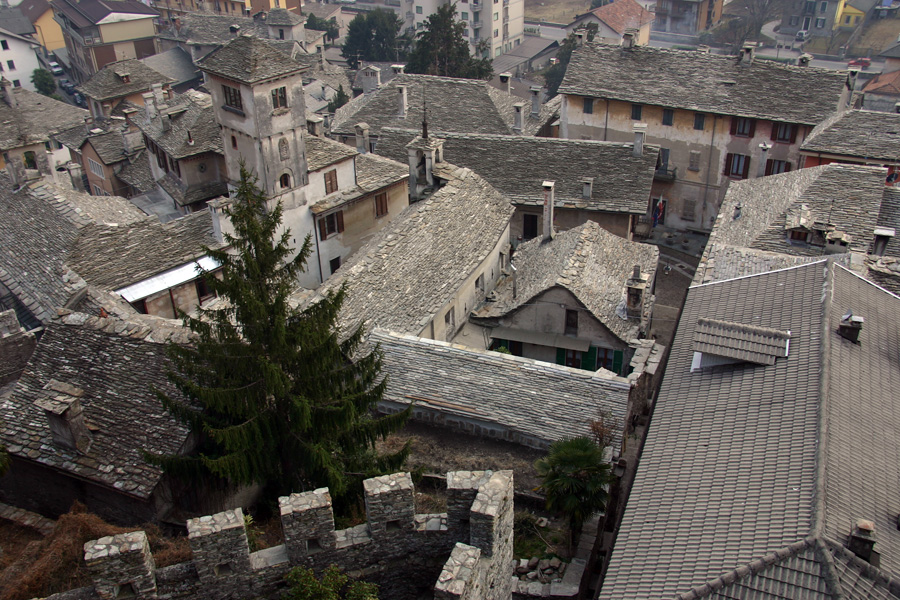

- Location within Italy Location within Piedmont
- Coordinates: 46°0′N 8°17′E
- Country: Italy
- Region: Piedmont
- Province: Verbano-Cusio-Ossola (VB)
- Frazioni: Prata, Dresio, Genestredo

Government
  - Mayor: Marco Stefanetta

Area
  - Total: 15.62 km^{2} (6.03 sq mi)
- Elevation: 226 m (741 ft)

Population (31 December 2010)
  - Total: 1,785
  - Density: 114.3/km^{2} (296.0/sq mi)
- Demonym: Vogognesi
- Time zone: UTC+1 (CET)
  - Summer (DST): UTC+2 (CEST)
- Postal code: 28020
- Dialing code: 0324
- Patron saint: Beata Vergine Addolorata
- Saint day: 15 September
- Website: Official website

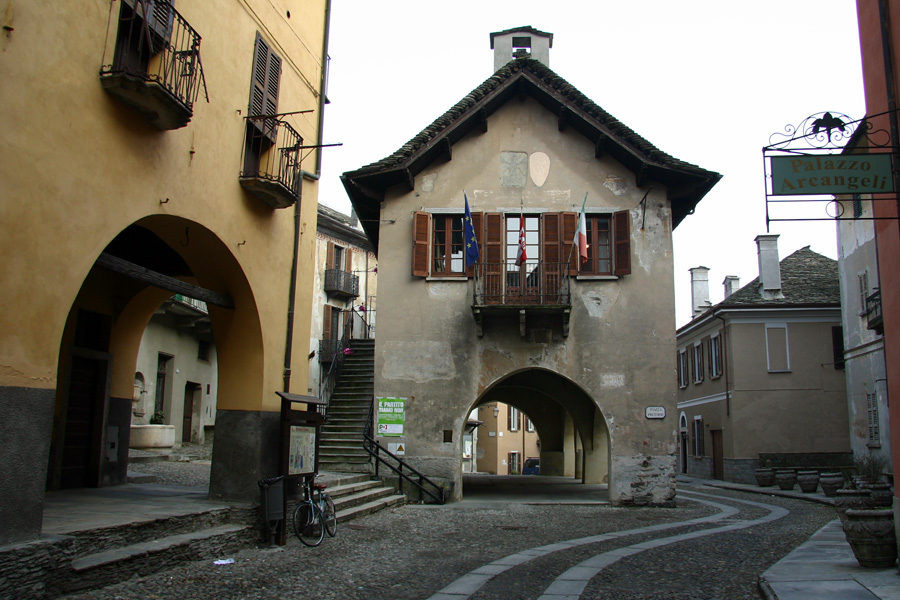
Palazzo Pretorio

Vogogna is a comune (municipality) at the heart of the Val d’Ossola in the Province of Verbano Cusio Ossola, Piedmont, Italy, about 20 kilometres (12 mi) north-west of Verbania. The municipality (population 1,785 as of 2010) is centred on the town of Vogogna and extends over an area of 15.28 square kilometres (5.90 mi^{2}), partly within the Val Grande National Park; the elevation varies between 211 and 2,018 metres (692 and 6,621 ft) above sea-level. Outlying settlements (frazioni) within the municipality include Prata, Dresio and Genestredo.

The surrounding municipalities are Beura-Cardezza, Pallanzeno, Piedimulera, Pieve Vergonte and Premosello-Chiovenda. It is one of I Borghi più belli d'Italia ("The most beautiful villages of Italy").

== Main sights ==
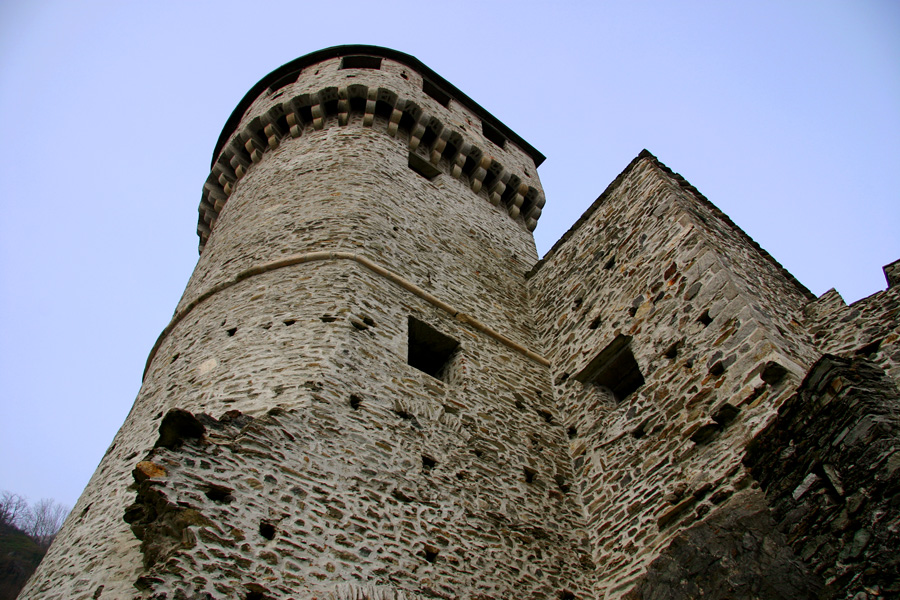
Castello Visconteo

The Vogogna Castle, in via Castello, was built in 1344 for the bishop of Novara, Giovanni Visconti, and extended in 1449. Above the castle are the remains of the old rocca which dates from the ninth or tenth century.

The Palazzo Pretorio, or broletto, was constructed in 1348, also at the behest of Giovanni Visconti.

The Sacro Cuore di Gesú is the parish church which was erected between 1894 and 1904 in a neo-Gothic style.

San Pietro, in the frazione Dresio, is a church of ancient origins and contains two noted fifteenth-century frescoes; it has been suggested that the figure representing a Servite saint has recently been identified as Pellegrino Laziosi, the most prominent saint of that order.

== Twin towns — sister cities ==
Vogogna is twinned with:

- Lançon-Provence, France
