= San Bernardino Verbano =

- Comune
- Comune di San Bernardino Verbano
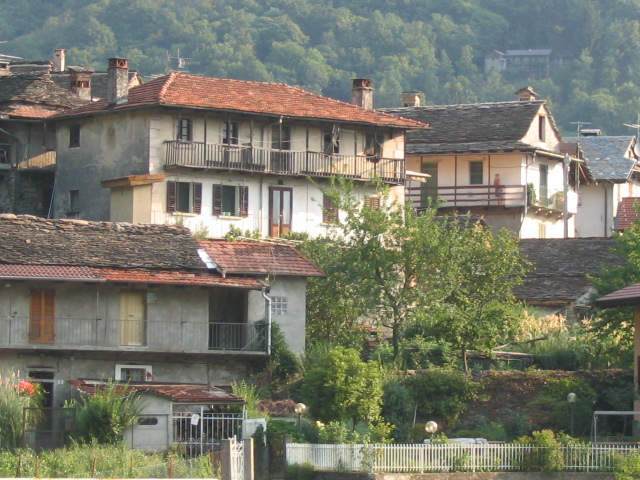

- Coat of arms

- Location within Italy Location within Piedmont
- Coordinates: 45°57′N 8°31′E
- Country: Italy
- Region: Piedmont
- Province: Verbano-Cusio-Ossola (VB)
- Frazioni: Santino, Bieno, Rovegro

Government
  - Mayor: Giovanni Lietta

Area
  - Total: 26.0 km^{2} (10.0 sq mi)

Population (30 September 2009)
  - Total: 1,322
  - Density: 50.8/km^{2} (132/sq mi)
- Demonym: Sanbernardinesi
- Time zone: UTC+1 (CET)
  - Summer (DST): UTC+2 (CEST)
- Postal code: 28059
- Dialing code: 0323

San Bernardino Verbano is a comune (municipality) in the Province of Verbano-Cusio-Ossola in the Italian region Piedmont, located about 120 kilometres (75 mi) northeast of Turin and about 2 kilometres (1.2 mi) northwest of Verbania.

San Bernardino Verbano borders the following municipalities: Cossogno, Mergozzo, Premosello-Chiovenda, Verbania. Part of the territory is included in the Val Grande National Park.
