= Premosello-Chiovenda =

- Comune
- Comune di Premosello-Chiovenda
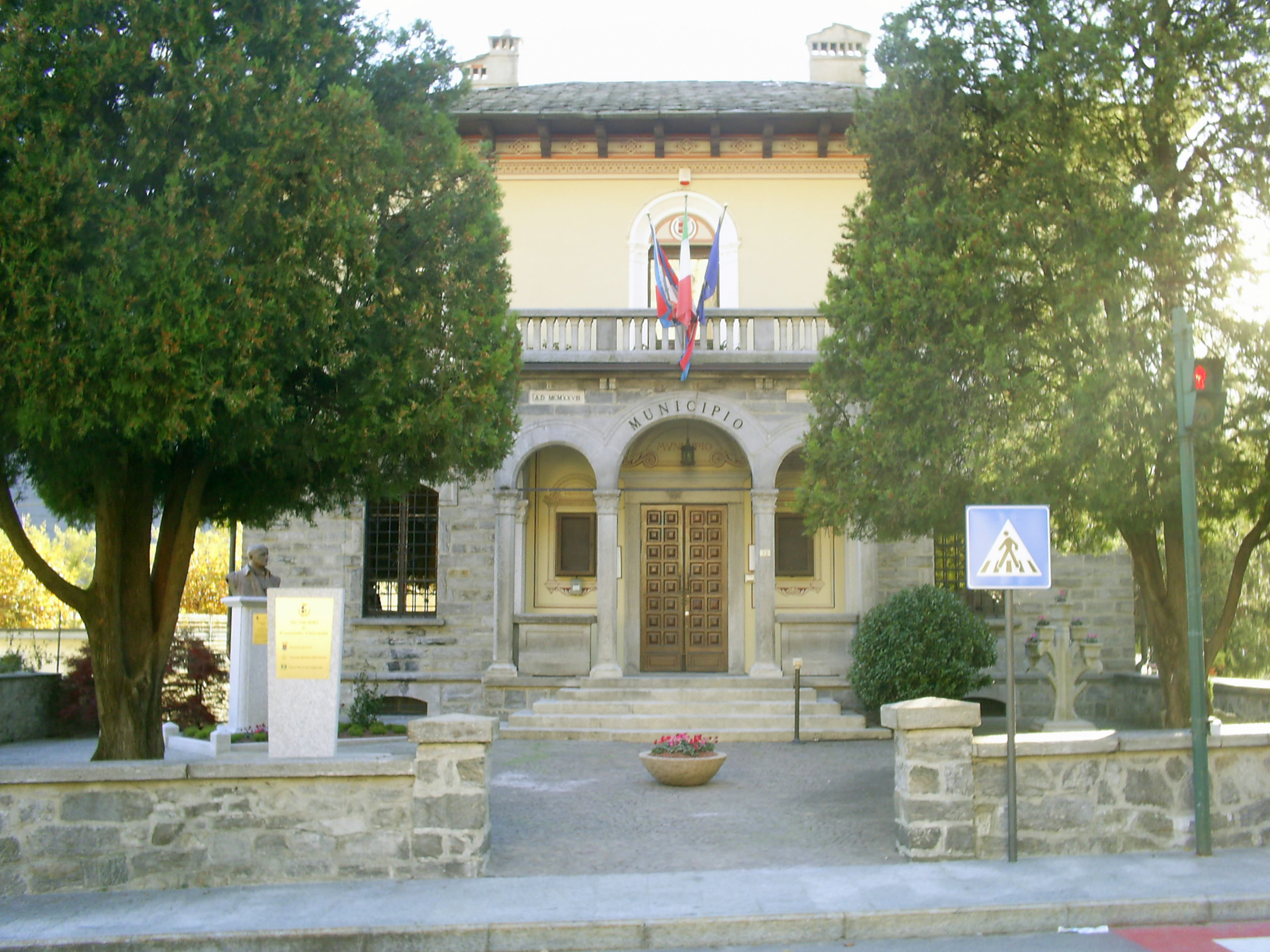

- Coat of arms

- Location within Italy Location within Piedmont
- Coordinates: 46°0′N 8°20′E
- Country: Italy
- Region: Piedmont
- Province: Verbano-Cusio-Ossola (VB)
- Frazioni: Colloro, Cuzzago

Government
  - Mayor: Elio Fovanna

Area
  - Total: 34.1 km^{2} (13.2 sq mi)
- Elevation: 220 m (720 ft)

Population (31 December 2021)
  - Total: 1,838
  - Density: 53.9/km^{2} (140/sq mi)
- Demonym: Premosellesi
- Time zone: UTC+1 (CET)
  - Summer (DST): UTC+2 (CEST)
- Postal code: 28803
- Dialing code: 0324
- Website: Official website

Premosello-Chiovenda is a comune (municipality) in the Province of Verbano-Cusio-Ossola in the Italian region Piedmont, located about 110 kilometres (68 mi) northeast of Turin and about 15 kilometres (9 mi) northwest of Verbania.

Premosello-Chiovenda borders the following municipalities: Anzola d'Ossola, Beura-Cardezza, Cossogno, Mergozzo, Ornavasso, Pieve Vergonte, San Bernardino Verbano, Trontano, Vogogna. The original name, Premosello, was changed in 1959 in memory of local jurist Giuseppe Chiovenda.

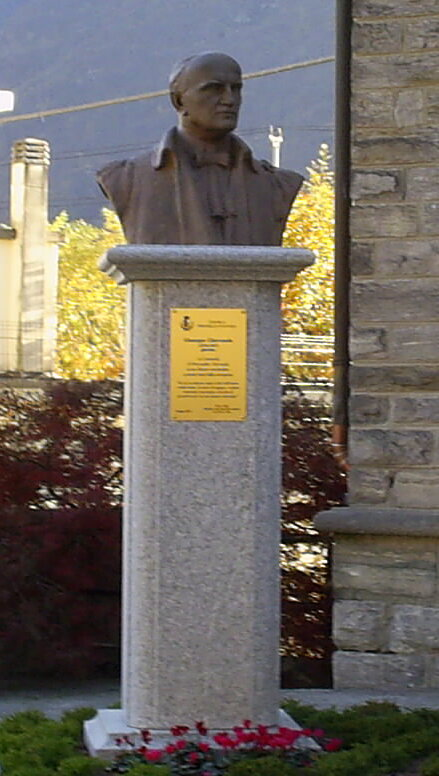
Giuseppe Chiovenda

== See also ==
- Pizzo Proman
