= Cima della Laurasca =

Mountain in Italy

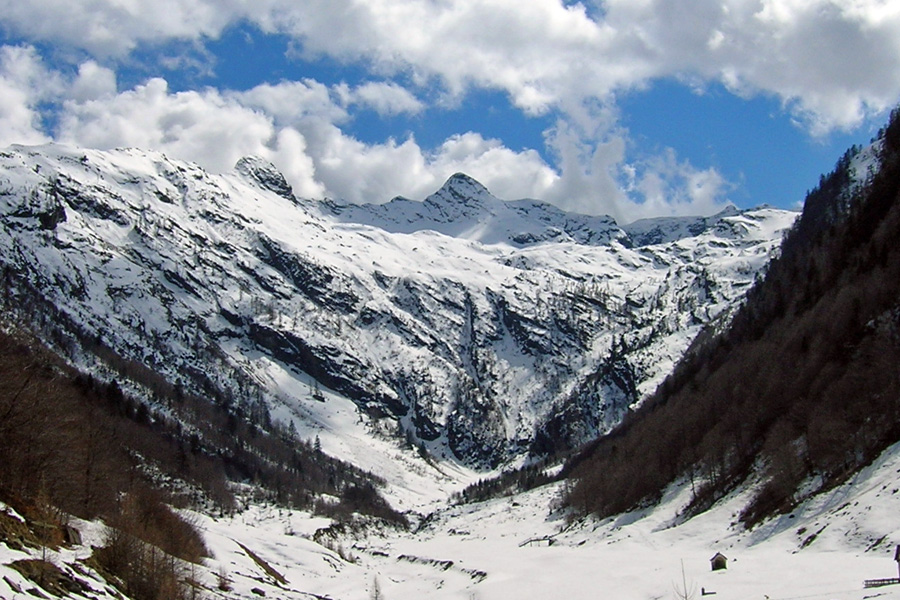
- Cima della Laurasca in winter

Highest point
- Elevation: 2,193 m (7,195 ft)
- Prominence: 370 m (1,210 ft)
- Isolation: 6.35 km (3.95 mi)
- Coordinates: 46°03′29″N 8°28′33″E

Geography
- Location: Piedmont, Italy
- Parent range: Lepontine Alps

Cima della Laurasca is a mountain of Piedmont, Italy, with an elevation of 2,193 metres (7,195 ft). It is located in the Lepontine Alps, in the Province of Verbano-Cusio-Ossola.

The mountain is located between the Val Grande and the Val Loana, a branch of the Val Vigezzo, and lies within the borders of the Val Grande National Park. Its peak can be reached on foot from Malesco.
