= Cossogno =

- Comune
- Comune di Cossogno
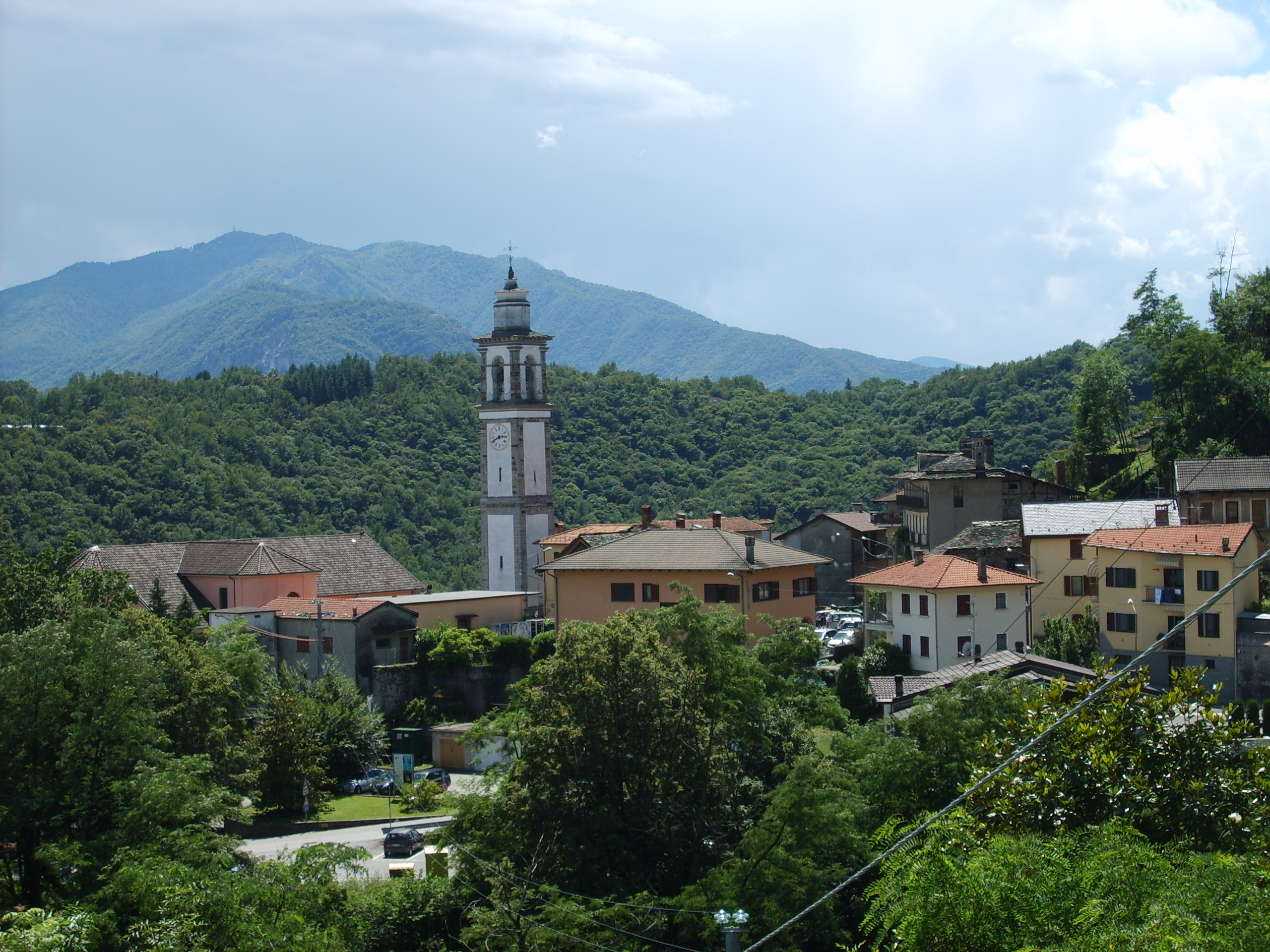

- Coat of arms

- Location within Italy Location within Piedmont
- Coordinates: 46°6′N 8°34′E
- Country: Italy
- Region: Piedmont
- Province: Verbano-Cusio-Ossola (VB)
- Frazioni: Cicogna, Ungiasca

Government
  - Mayor: Silvia Marchionini

Area
  - Total: 40.1 km^{2} (15.5 sq mi)
- Elevation: 398 m (1,306 ft)

Population (30 September 2008)
  - Total: 571
  - Density: 14.2/km^{2} (36.9/sq mi)
- Demonym: Cossognesi
- Time zone: UTC+1 (CET)
  - Summer (DST): UTC+2 (CEST)
- Postal code: 28054
- Dialing code: 0323
- Website: Official website

Cossogno (Lombard: Cussögn) is a comune (municipality) in the Province of Verbano-Cusio-Ossola in the Italian region Piedmont, located about 130 kilometres (81 mi) northeast of Turin and about 20 kilometres (12 mi) north of Verbania.

Cossogno borders the following municipalities: Malesco, Miazzina, Premosello-Chiovenda, San Bernardino Verbano, Trontano, Valle Cannobina, Verbania. Part of its territory is included in the Val Grande National Park.
