= Monte Capezzone =

Mountain in Italy

- Jungebärg
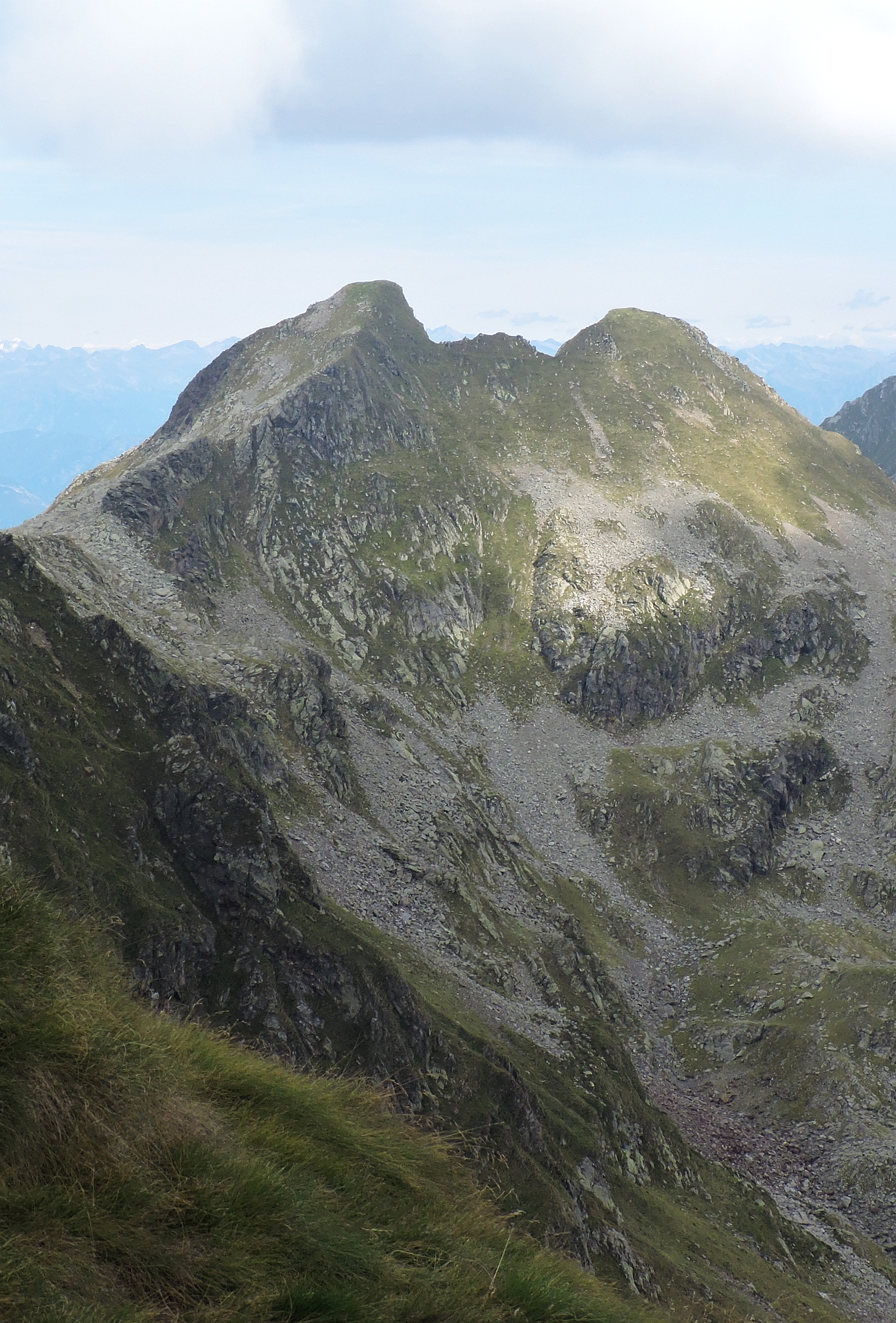
- Monte Capezzone as seen from the Altemberg

Highest point
- Elevation: 2,421 m (7,943 ft)
- Prominence: 603 m (1,978 ft)
- Isolation: 9.82 km (6.10 mi)
- Listing: Alpine mountains 2000-2499 m
- Coordinates: 45°56′42″N 8°12′32″E

Geography
- Location within Alps
- Location: Province of Verbano-Cusio-Ossola / Province of Vercelli, Italy
- Parent range: Pennine Alps

Climbing
- Easiest route: hiking

The Monte Capezzone (in Titzschu Jungebärg) is a mountain in the Pennine Alps of north-western Italy; with an elevation of 2,421 m (7,943 ft) is the highest peak of the Strona Valley.

== Geography ==
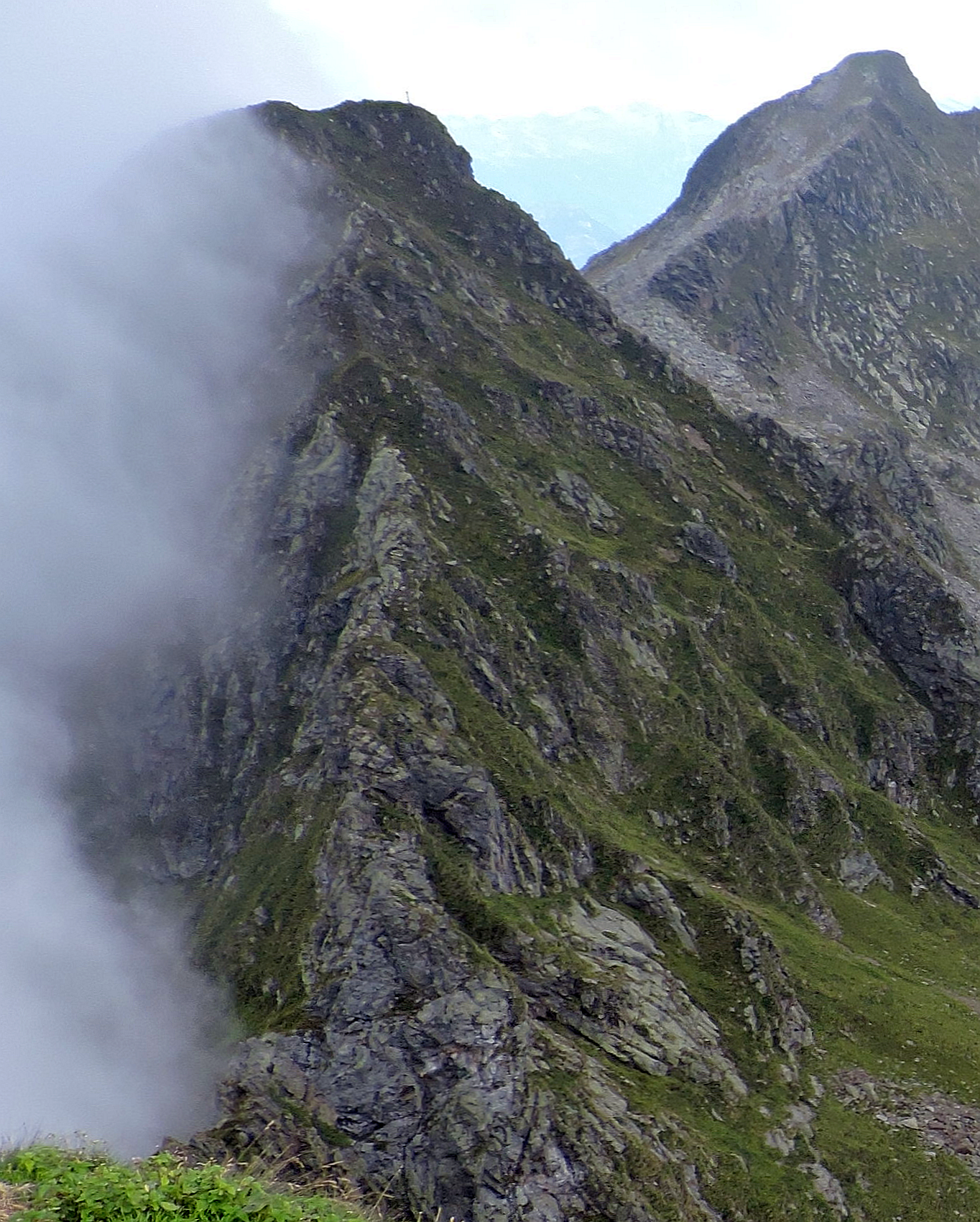
Monte Capezzone (right) and Cima Lago

The mountain is located at the tripoint between three valleys: Valstrona, Valle Anzasca and Valle Mastallone (the latter a side valley of Valsesia). The Sesia/Anzasca wayer divide goes on westwards with Monte Mora (2,298 m (7,539 ft)) and Cima Cresta 2,316 m (7,598 ft). From the summit of Monte Capezzone starts the dividing range between Val Strona and Val Mastallone which, heading South, after the Colle della Crocetta and the Cima Lago (2,401 m (7,877 ft)) reaches the Altemberg (Alpi Cusiane). Estwards the water divide between the valleys of the Strona and the Anza heads towards the Monte Massone. Administratively the summit of Monte Capezzone is the tripoint where the borders of the comunes of Rimella (VC), Calasca-Castiglione (VB) and Valstrona (VB) meet. Close to the main elevation of the mountain stands a cross.

=== SOIUSA classification ===
According to the SOIUSA (International Standardized Mountain Subdivision of the Alps) the mountain can be classified in the following way:

- main part = Western Alps
- major sector = North Western Alps
- section = Pennine Alps
- subsection = Eastern Aosta and Northern Valsesia Alps
- supergroup = Contrafforti valsesiani del Monte Rosa
- group = Costiera Punta Grober-Tagliaferro-Montevecchio
- subgroup = Contrafforte Montevecchio-Quarazzola-Capezzone
- code = I/B-9.III-C.7.b/b

== Geology ==
At the foot of the Capezzone a geologic survey discovered gold mineralizations embedded in schistose rock layers.

== Access to the summit ==
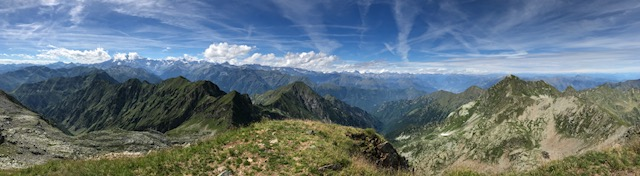
Panorama from the summit

The summit of the Capezzone can be accessed starting from Campello Monti (a former autonomous comune now belonging to Valstrona). After the bivouac Abele Traglio, located on the Lake Capezzone shore, a waymarked track reaches the Colle della Crocetta saddle and, turning right, climbs the Sesia/Stona ridge up to the summit cross. The Colle della Crocetta can also be reached from Rimella with an uneasy hiking itinerary.

== Nature conservation ==
The slopes of Monte Capezzone facing Valstrona and Valsesia are part of the regional park of Alta Val Sesia e dell'Alta Val Strona. The area is also preserved by the establishment of S.C.I. named "Campello Monti" (code IT1140003) and of a whider protected area named Alta Val Strona e la Val Segnara (code IT1140020).

== Mountain huts ==
By the Lake Capezzone at 2,100 m (6,890 ft) stands the Bivacco Abele Traglio, an unattended and always open mountain hut; in Campello Monti, during the summer, can be used a posto tappa (simple accommodation) of the GTA.

== Maps ==
- Cartografia ufficiale italiana in scala 1:25.000 e 1:100.000 (Map). Istituto Geografico Militare.
- Carta in scala 1:50.000 n. 10 Monte Rosa, Alagna e Macugnaga (Map). Torino: Istituto Geografico Centrale.
