= Monte Capio =

Mountain in Italy

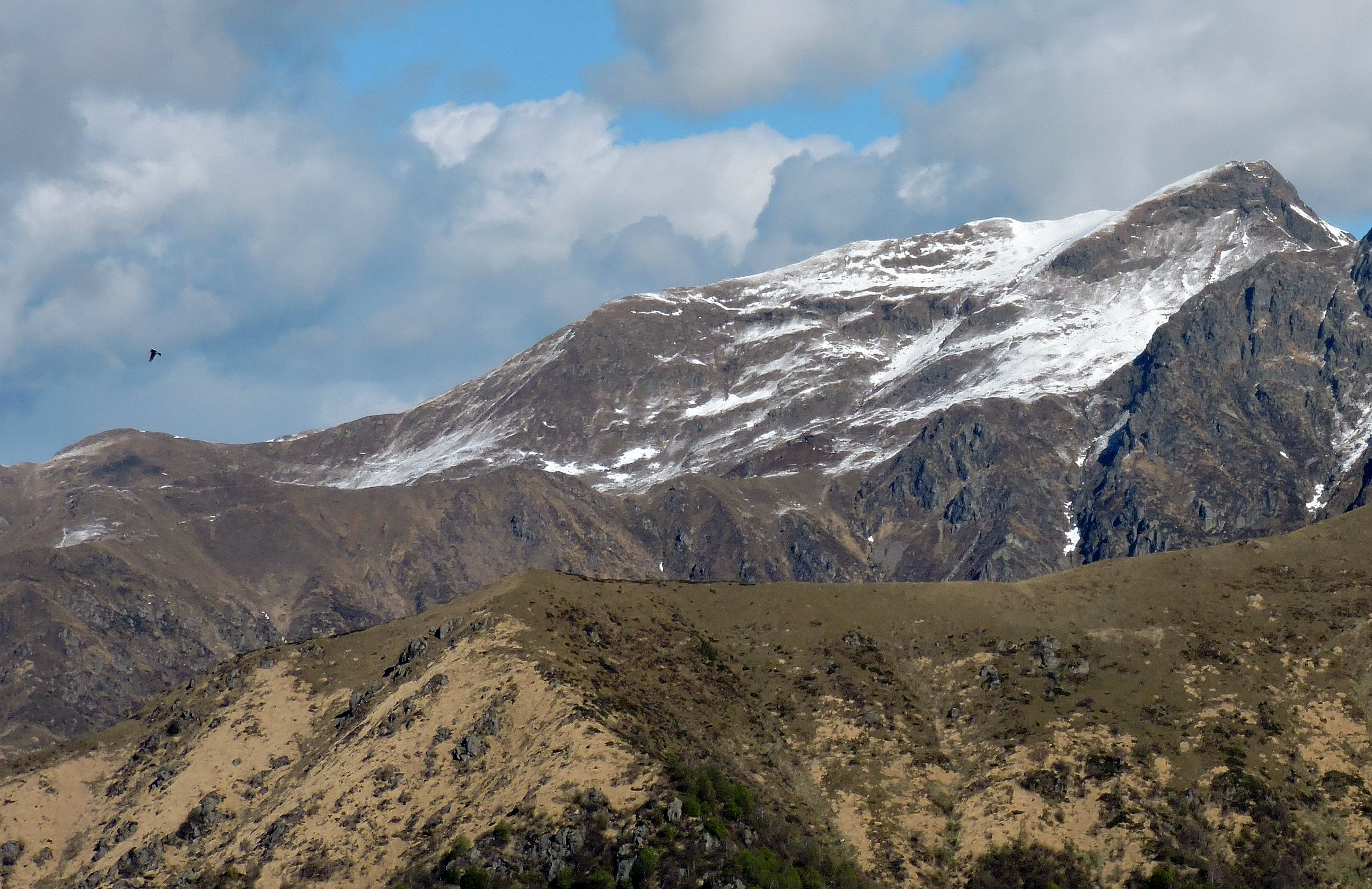
- Monte Capio from the Cima del Camossaro

Highest point
- Elevation: 2,172 m (7,126 ft)
- Prominence: 248 m (814 ft)
- Coordinates: 45°54′38″N 8°14′19″E

Geography
- Location within Alps
- Location: Province of Verbano-Cusio-Ossola / Province of Vercelli, Italy
- Parent range: Alpi Cusiane (Pennine Alps)

Climbing
- Easiest route: hiking

The Monte Capio is a mountain in the Pennine Alps of north-western Italy; with an elevation of 2,172 m (7,126 ft) is one of the highest peaks of the Alpi Cusiane.

== Geography ==
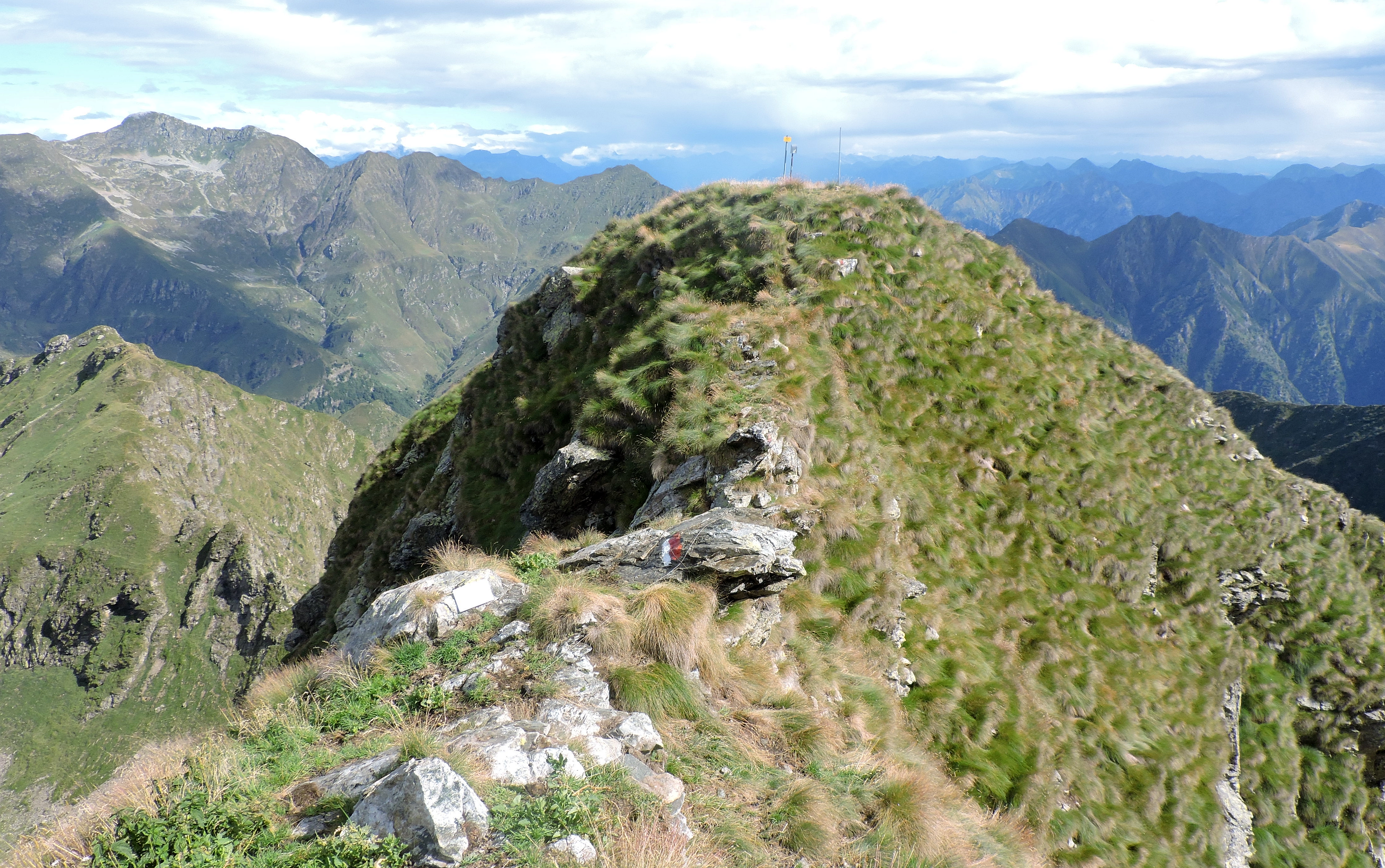
Monte Capio summit as seen from its subsummit

The mountain is located on the water divide between the valleys of the Strona and the Mastallone (the latter a side valley of Valsesia). The main ridge goes on southwards with Passo dei Rossi (2,056 m), a mountain pass dividing Monte Capio from the neighbouring Cima dei Rossi (2,134 m), while northwards the chain continues with Bocchetta di Rimella (1,924 m) and then with the Altemberg. Administratively the summit of Monte Capio is the tripoint where the borders of the comunes of Rimella (VC), Cravagliana (VC) and Valstrona (VB) meet. Close to the main elevation of the mountain stands a subsummit with a small cross and a metal bell. A sharp saddle connecting it with the actual summit is equipped with a metal cable, in order to facilitate the passage. A trigpoint of the IGM marks the main summit, where also stands a metal box with a register.

=== SOIUSA classification ===
According to the SOIUSA (International Standardized Mountain Subdivision of the Alps) the mountain can be classified in the following way:

- main part = Western Alps
- major sector = North Western Alps
- section = Pennine Alps
- subsection = Southern Valsesia Alps
- supergroup = Alpi Cusiane
- group = Costiera Capio-Massa del Turlo
- code = I/B-9.IV-B.3

== History ==
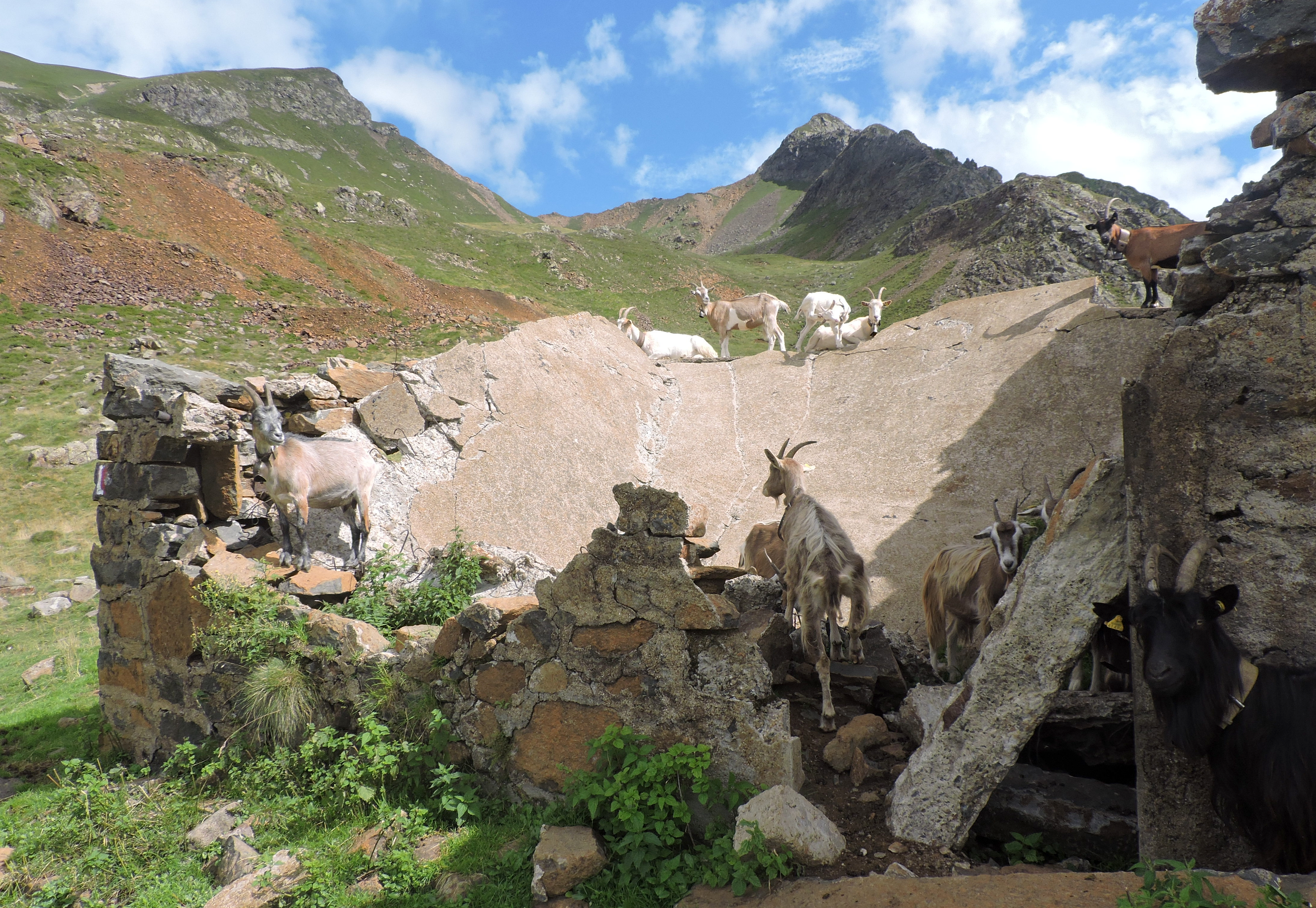
The old mine

On the eastern slopes of the mountain worked in the past a nikel mine, whose remains are still recognisable. In 2017 the local authorities authorised new mining prospectings aiming to search for presence of nickel, copper, platinum and gold minerals.

== Access to the summit ==
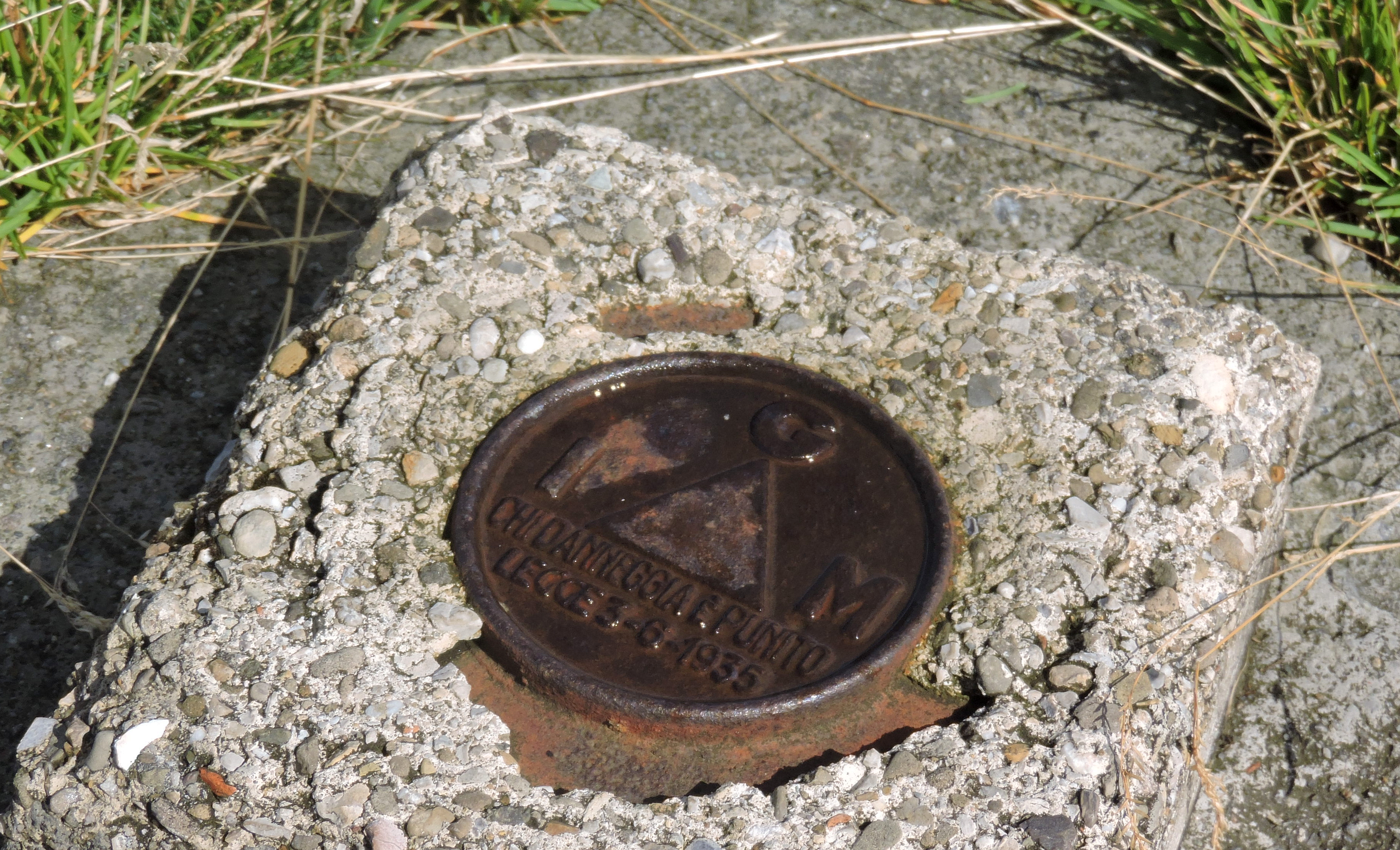
Summit trigpoint

The summit of the Capio can be accessed starting from Campello Monti (a former autonomous comune now belonging to Valstrona), or following a longer footpath from Sabbia, in Valsesia. The Monte Capio is quite a well known hiking destination because

... isolata com'è, rappresenta uno dei punti panoramici più famosi della Valsesia

Translation:

... being so isolated, the Monte Capio offers one of the most famous panoramic viewpoints of Valsesia

== Nature conservation ==
The slopes of Monte Capio facing Valstrona are part of the regional park of Alta Val Sesia e dell'Alta Val Strona.
