= Cima Altemberg =

Mountain in Italy

- Altenberg
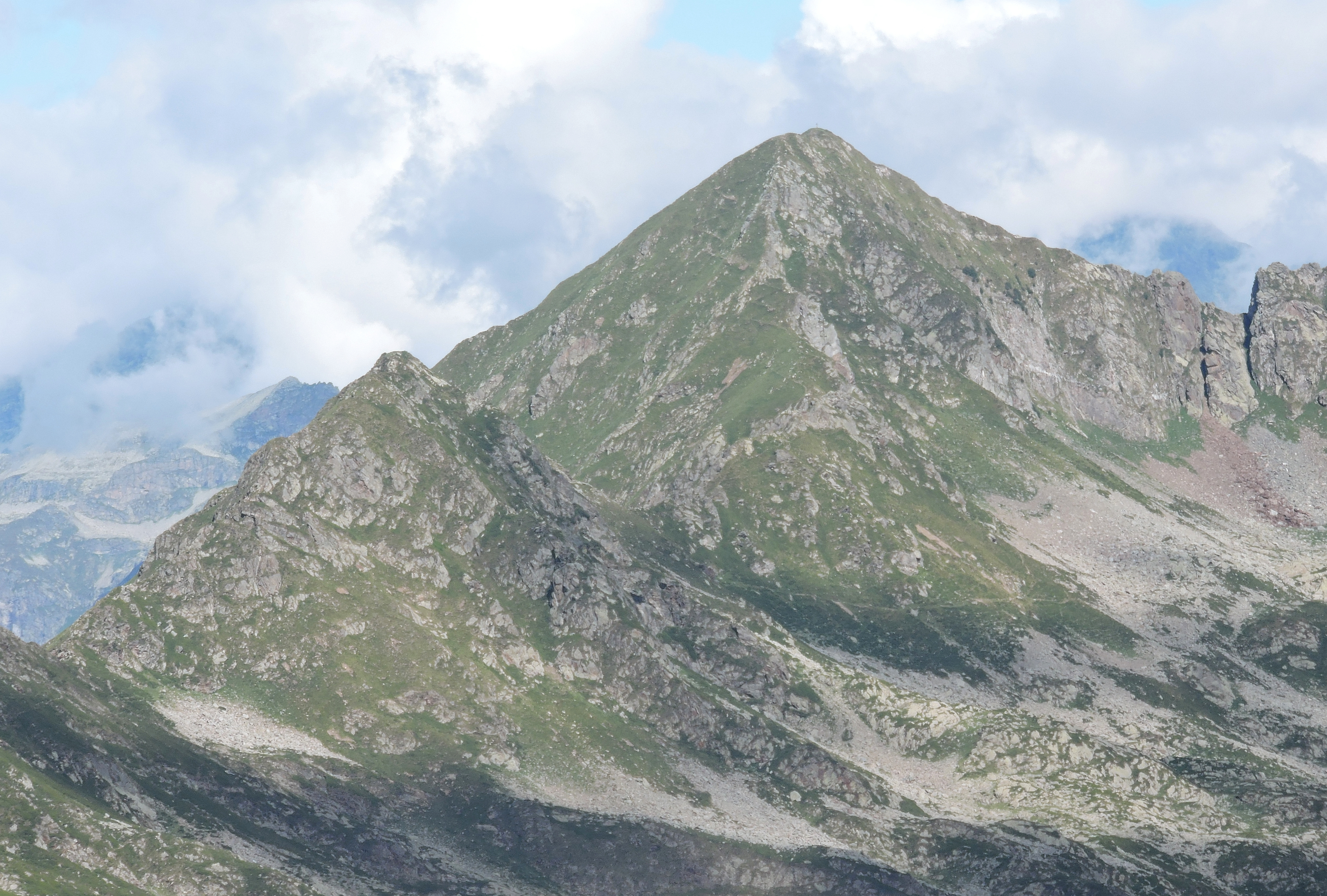
- The Altemberg as seen from Monte Capio

Highest point
- Elevation: 2,395 m (7,858 ft)
- Prominence: 94 m (308 ft)
- Isolation: 1.03 km (0.64 mi)
- Coordinates: 45°56′11″N 8°12′14″E

Geography
- Location within Alps
- Location: Province of Verbano-Cusio-Ossola / Province of Vercelli, Italy
- Parent range: Alpi Cusiane (Pennine Alps)

Climbing
- Easiest route: hiking from Campello Monti or Rimella

The Altemberg is a mountain in the Pennine Alps of north-western Italy; with an elevation of 2,395 m (7,858 ft) is the highest peak of the Alpi Cusiane.

== Toponymy ==
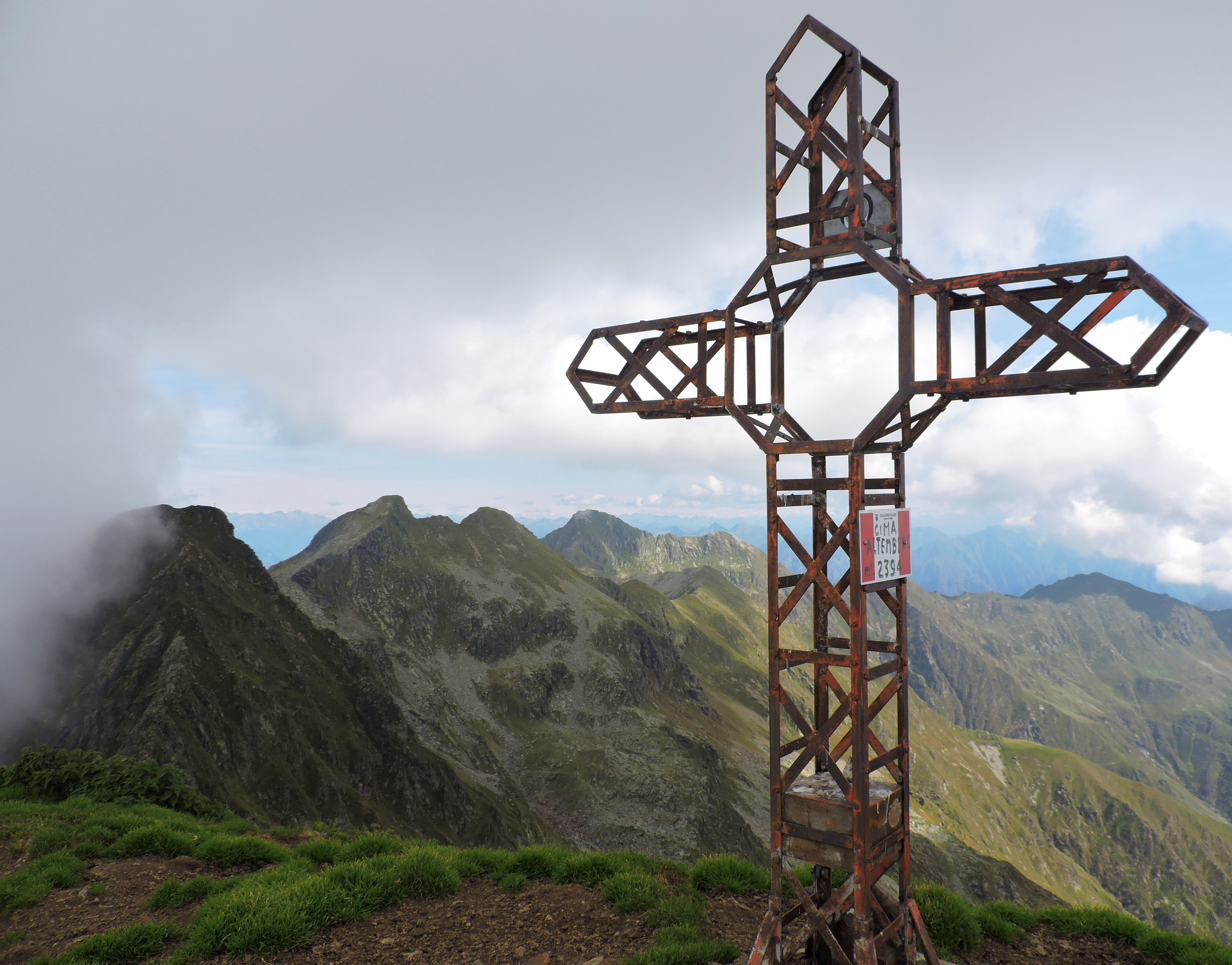
Altemberg Summit cross

The name of the mountain is connected to the Walser German, a language spoken by people who settled into the upper valley of the Strona and Sesia centuries ago. In German Alten means old while Berg means hill or mountain, so the English meaning of the name could be old mountain (vecchia montagna in Italian).

== Geography ==
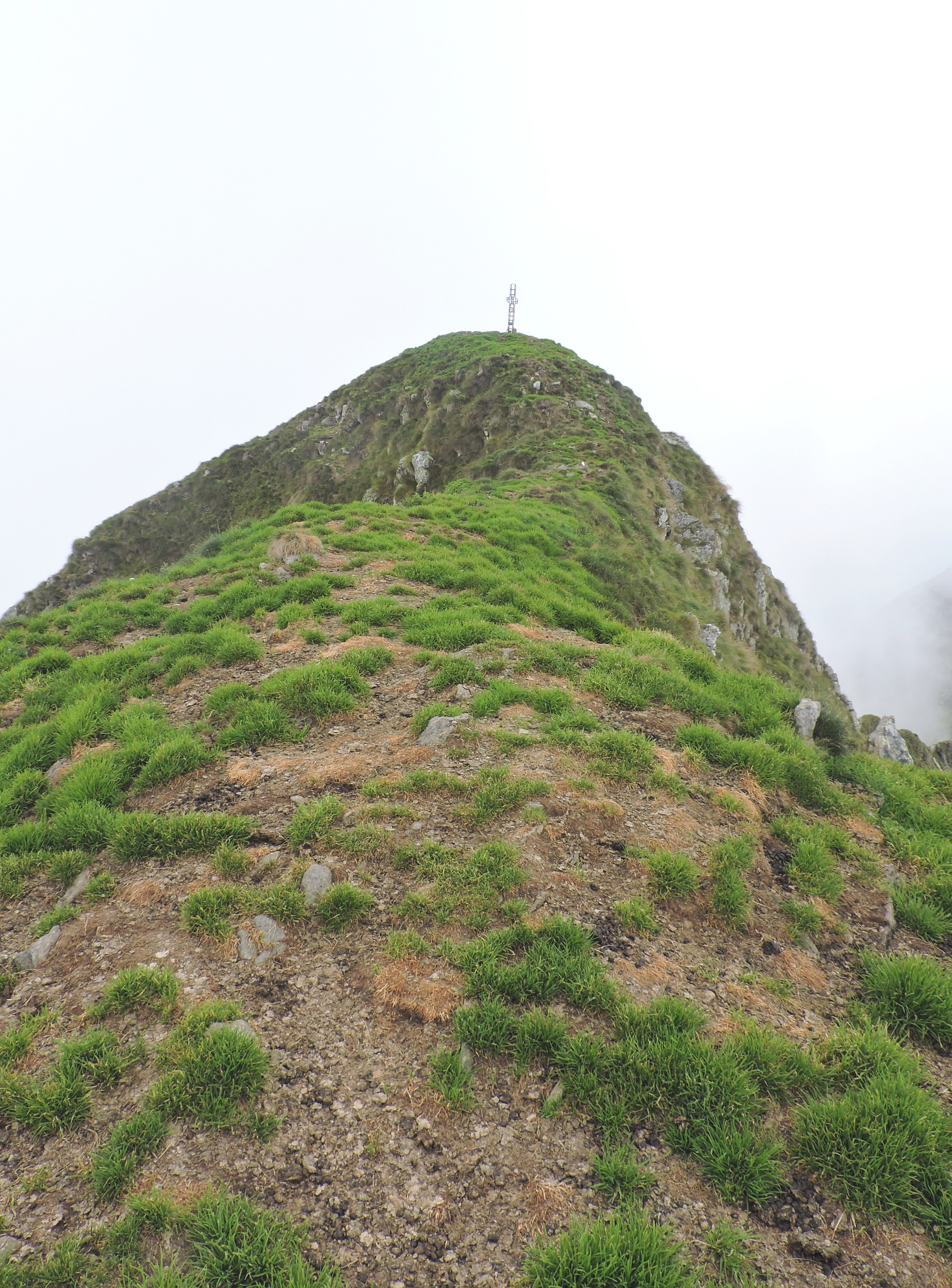
View of the summit

The Altemberg is located on the water divide between Strona and Sesia valleys, South of the Bocchetta Stretta pass, which divides it from the neighbouring Cima Lago. Towards SE the ridge goes on with a saddle named Bocchetta delle Vacche and the Cima del Pizzo (2,233 m). Administratively the mountain belongs to both the comunes of Rimella (West of the summit) and Valstrona. On its summit stands a metallic cross.

=== SOIUSA classification ===
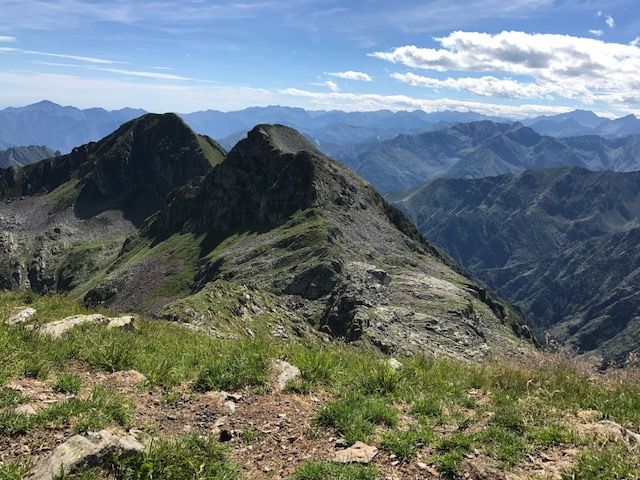
Altemberg (left) and Cima Lago

According to the SOIUSA (International Standardized Mountain Subdivision of the Alps) the mountain can be classified in the following way:

- main part = Western Alps
- major sector = North Western Alps
- section = Pennine Alps
- subsection = Southern Valsesia Alps
- supergroup = Alpi Cusiane
- group = Costiera Capio-Massa del Turlo
- code = I/B-9.IV-B.3

== Access to the summit ==
The Altemberg can be accessed following a footpath from Campello Monti, a village in the comune of Valstrona, or from Rimella, in Valsesia. The ridge between connecting the Altemberg with Cima Lago needs some climbing skill to be crossed and is rated as PD grade

== Nature conservation ==
Cima Altemberg is part of the regional park of Alta Val Sesia e dell'Alta Val Strona.
