= Quarna =

Quarna may refer to:

- Quarna Sotto, comune in the Province of Verbano-Cusio-Ossola in the Italian region Piedmont
- Quarna Sopra, comune in the Province of Verbano-Cusio-Ossola in the Italian region Piedmont
