= Monte Massone =

Mountain in Italy

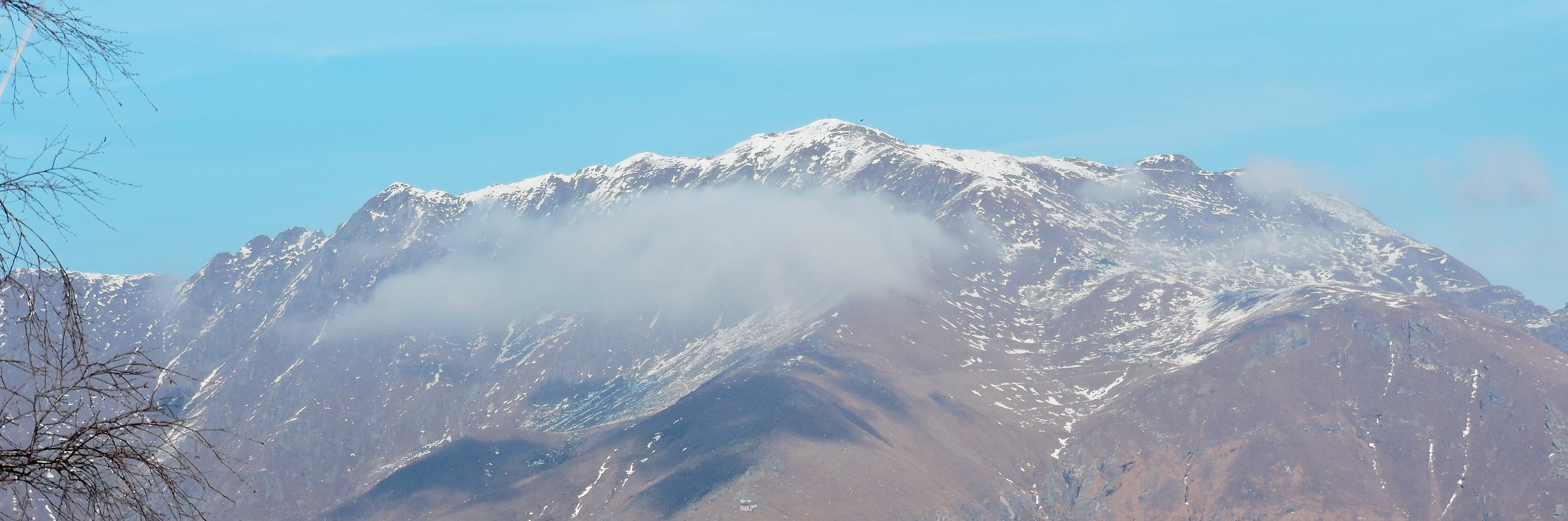
- Monte Massone as seen from the Monte Croce

Highest point
- Elevation: 2,161 m (7,090 ft)
- Prominence: 406 m (1,332 ft)
- Listing: Alpine mountains 2000-2499 m
- Coordinates: 45°56′48″N 8°20′16″E

Geography
- Location within Alps
- Location: Province of Verbano-Cusio-Ossola, Italy
- Parent range: Pennine Alps

Climbing
- Easiest route: hiking

The Monte Massone, at an elevation of 2,161 m (7,090 ft), is a mountain of the Pennine Alps in North-western Italy.

== Geography ==
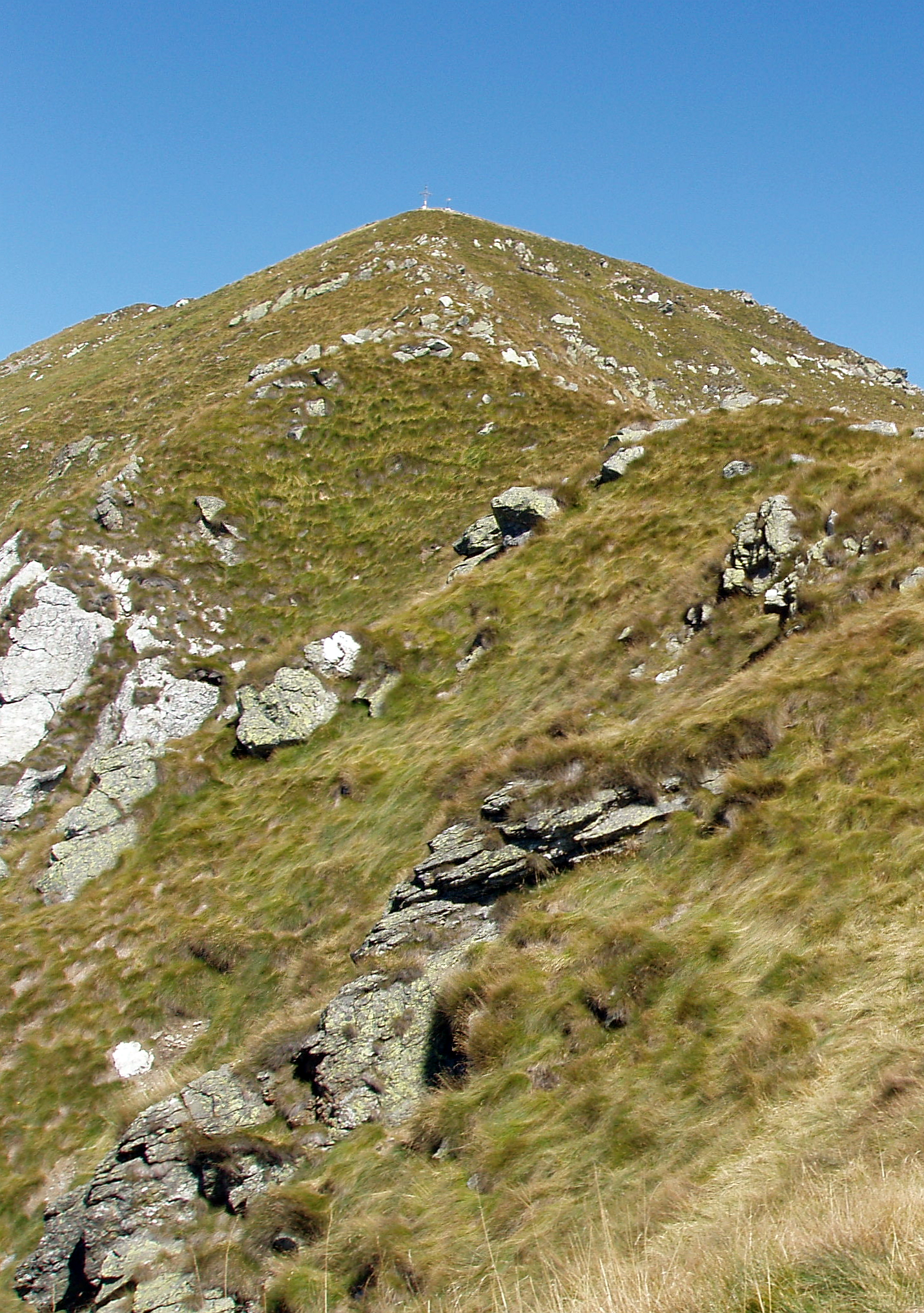
The summit as seen from the SE ridge

The mountain belongs to the water divide between Strona Valley (South) and Ossola Valley (North). The southern slopes of Monte Massone are mainly grassy, while its North face is rocky, very steep and covered by shrubs. From Ornavasso, located on its North foothill, the summit can't be seen because is hidden by a subsummit named Eyehorn (2,131 m). On Monte Massone stands a metallic cross 4 ms high bearing a bell, which was located there in 1921. Not far from it, on the Northern slopes of the mountain, can be seen some trenches dug before the 1st World War and belonging to the Linea Cadorna. At 1,900 m, on the Valle Strona side of Monte Massone, there is a small plateau which hosts three tiny lakes called Laghetti, where in the past local farmers tried to implement a project of land reclamation.

=== SOIUSA classification ===
According to the SOIUSA (International Standardized Mountain Subdivision of the Alps) the mountain can be classified in the following way:

- main part = Western Alps
- major sector = North Western Alps
- section = Pennine Alps
- subsection = Eastern Aosta and Northern Valsesia Alps
- supergroup = Contrafforti valsesiani del Monte Rosa
- group = Costiera Punta Grober-Tagliaferro-Montevecchio
- subgroup = Contrafforte Montevecchio-Quarazzola-Capezzone
- code = I/B-9.III-C.7.b/b

== Geology ==
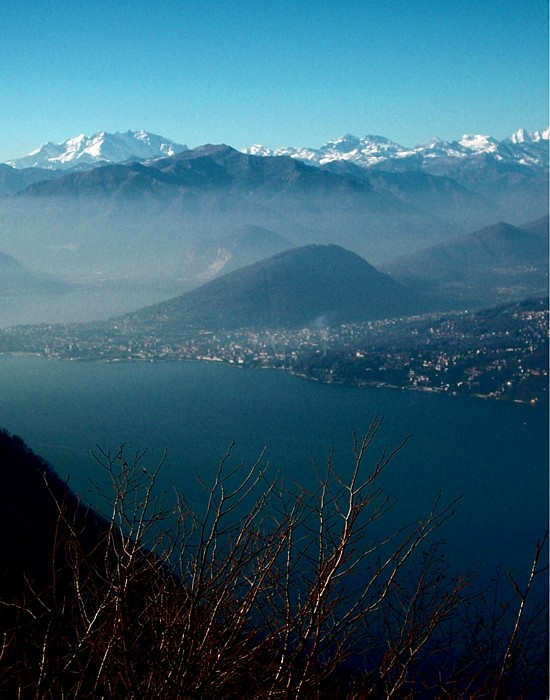
The Monte Massone, with Montorfano in the foreground and Monte Rosa in the background

Inside the mountain lay some marble veins and gold, iron and copper deposits.

== Access to the summit ==
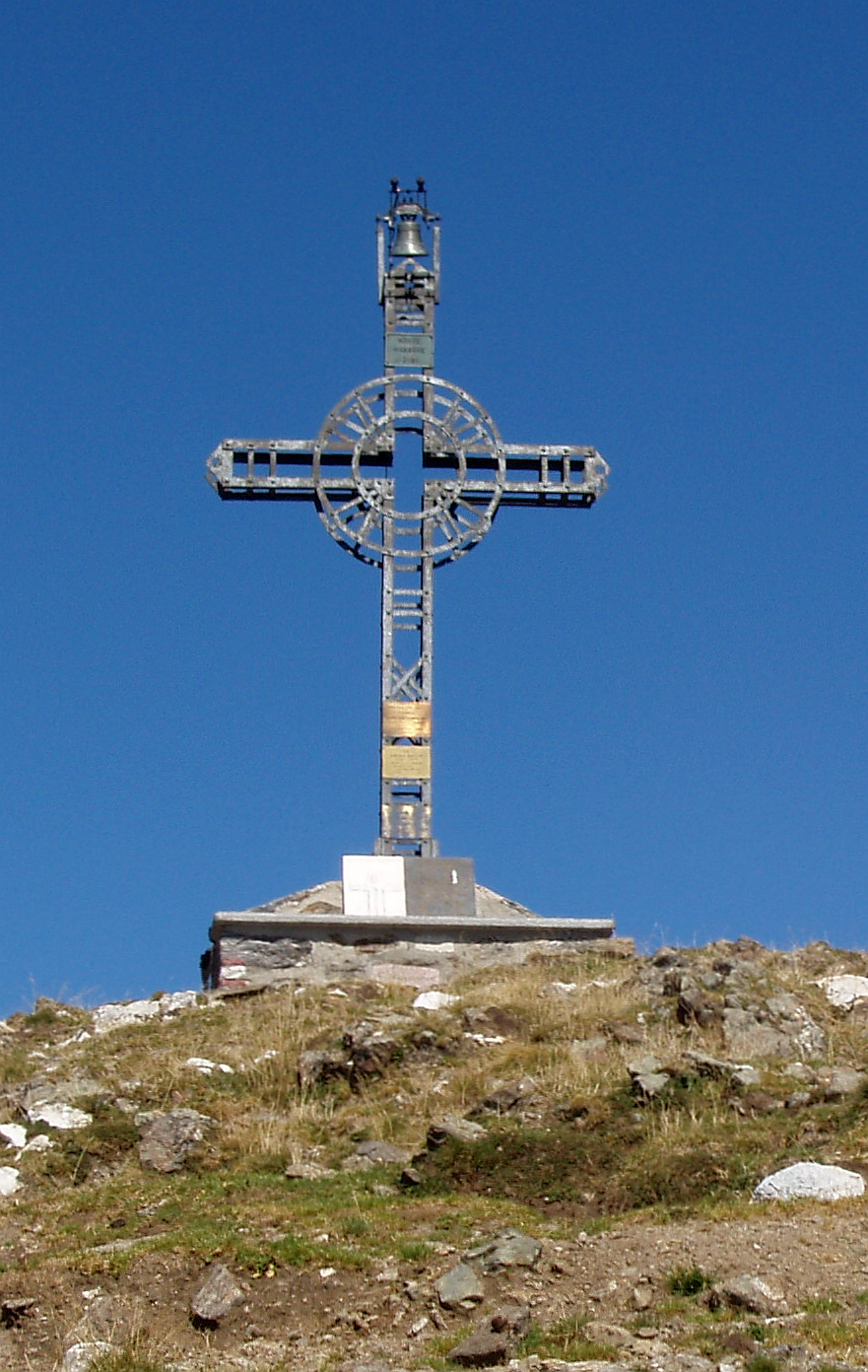
Summit cross

The Monte Massone is one of the most popular hiking destinations of the low Ossola Valley. Its summit can be reached by footpath from the Valle Strona starting from Alpe Loccia (close to the village of Chesio, in the comune of Loreglia), or from Val d'Ossola starting from Cortevecchio (Ornavasso), or even from the Alpe Quaggione (Germagno).

== Mountain huts ==
- Rifugio Oliva - Brusa Perona Renato, managed by the Club Alpino Italiano section of Gravellona Toce.

== Bibliography ==
- Castello, Alessandro; Protto, Elio; Zoia, Sandro (2013). Alpi Biellesi e Valsesiane. Guida dei Monti d'Italia (in Italian). CAI-TCI. ISBN 9788836549344.

== Maps ==
- Cartografia ufficiale italiana in scala 1:25.000 e 1:100.000 (Map). Istituto Geografico Militare.
- Carta in scala 1:50.000 n. 10 Monte Rosa, Alagna e Macugnaga (Map). Torino: Istituto Geografico Centrale.
