= Luzzogno =

- Frazione
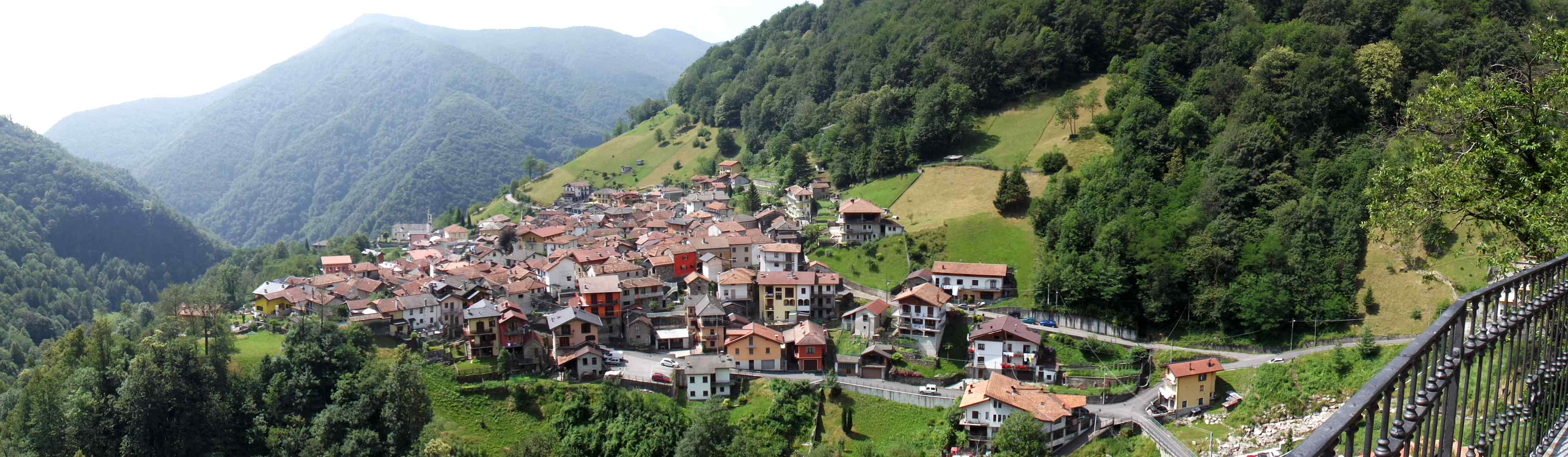

- Location of Luzzogno in Italy
- Coordinates: 45°54′52″N 8°20′41″E
- Country: Italy
- Region: Piedmont
- Province: Verbano-Cusio-Ossola (VB)
- Comune: Valstrona
- Elevation: 707 m (2,320 ft)

Population (2001)
  - Total: 353
- Time zone: UTC+1 (CET)
  - Summer (DST): UTC+2 (CEST)
- Postal code: 28897
- Dialing code: (+39) 0323

Luzzogno is a frazione (and parish ) of the municipality of Valstrona, in Piedmont, northern Italy.

== Overview ==
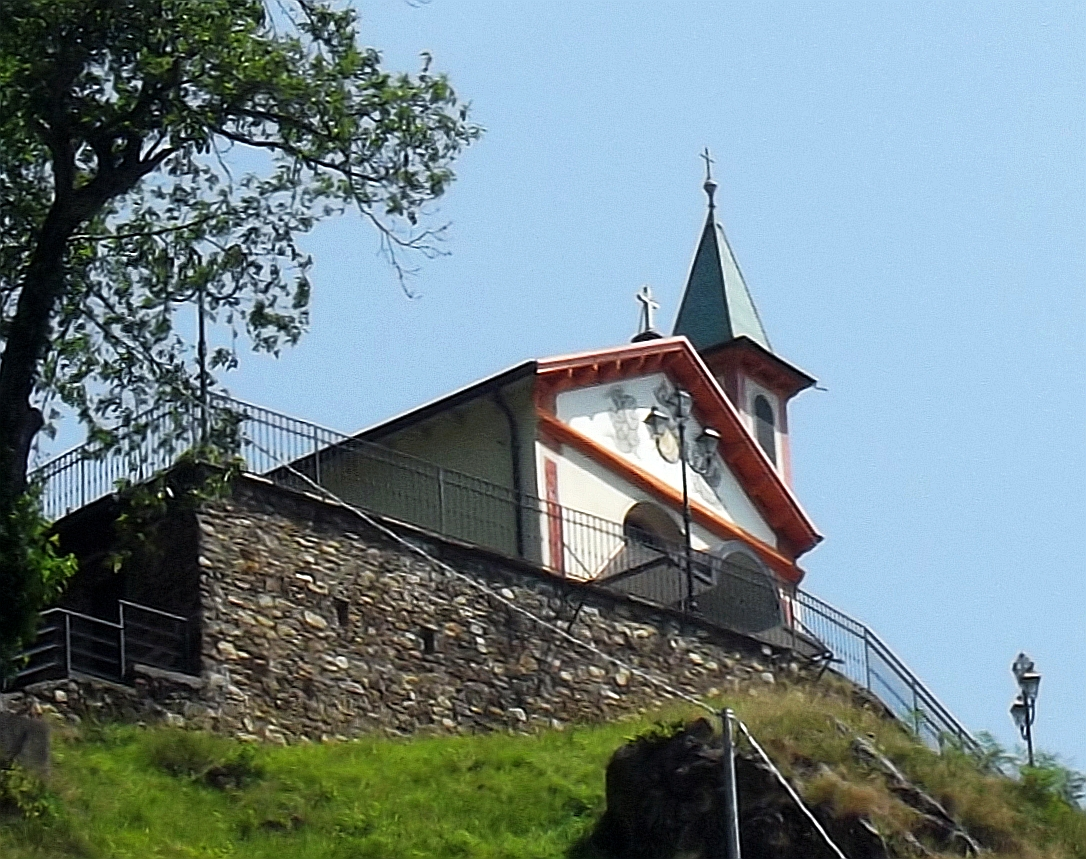
Madonna della Colletta sanctuary

It is a village located some km from the main road of the Valle Strona, on the left side of Strona river.

Since 1928 it was a separate comune (municipality).

=== Naming ===
Luzzogno should come from the latin Lux-omnium (light of everybody, or light of all the valley) or from Lucus-Usium, literally Usi's forest, being the Usi the old inhabitants of the area.
