= Sculli =

Sculli is a surname. Notable people with the surname include:

- Giuseppe Sculli (born 1981), Italian footballer
- Luigi Sculli (1921–1959), Italian footballer
