= Strona (river) =

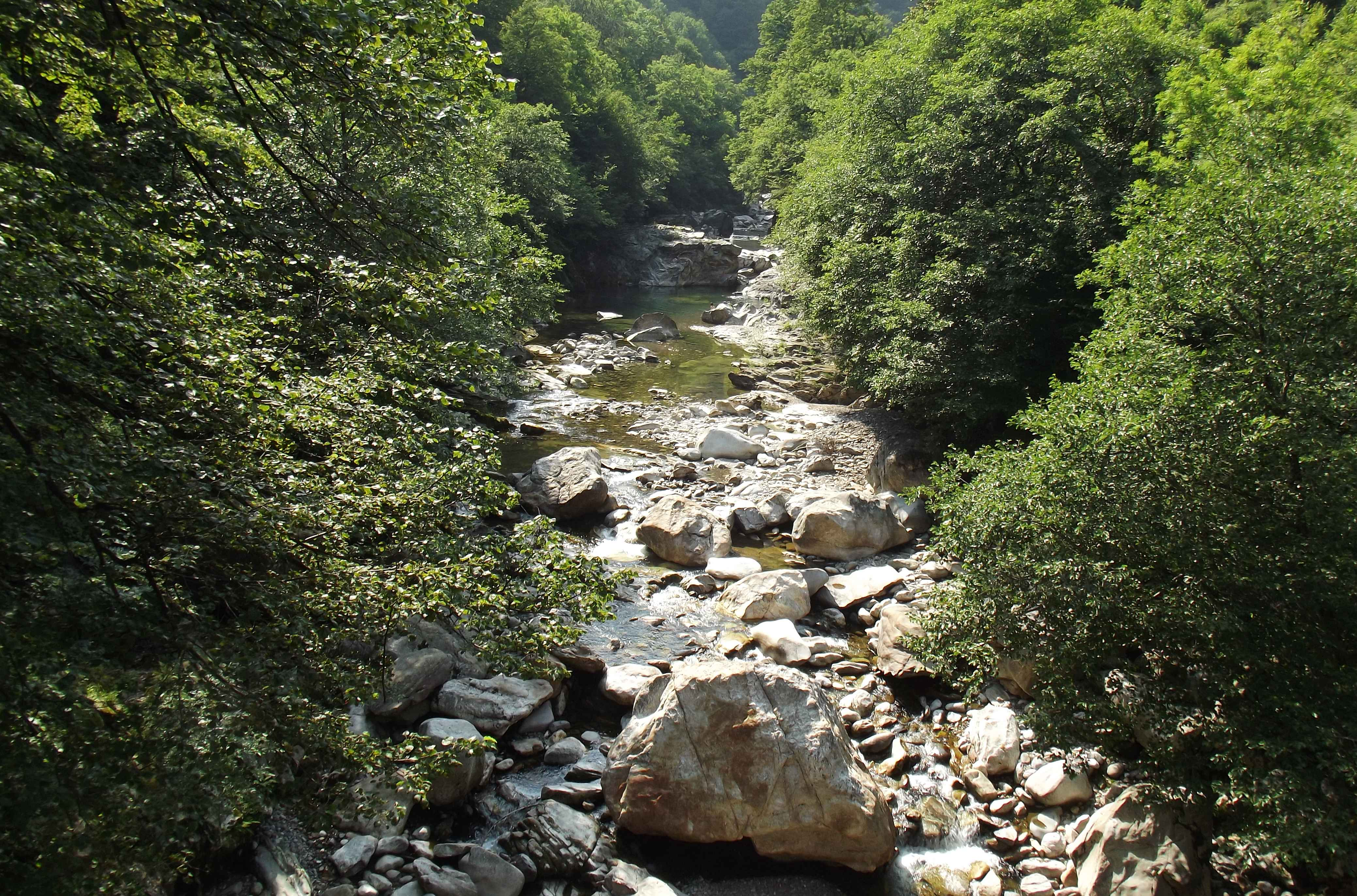
- The river near Loreglia

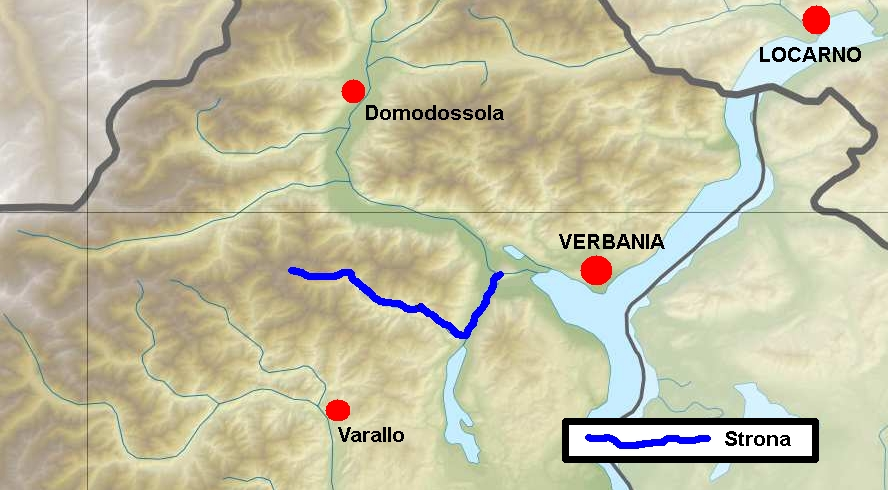
- Location within NE Piedmont (Italy)

Location
- Country: Italy

Physical characteristics
- Source
  - location: Lake of Monte Capezzone
  - elevation: 2,100 m (6,900 ft)
- Mouth
  - location: Toce near Gravellona Toce
  - coordinates: 45.9352°N 8.4443°E
- Basin size: 390 km^{2} (150 mi^{2})

Basin features
- Progression: Toce→ Lake Maggiore→ Ticino→ Po→ Adriatic Sea
- Tributaries
  - right: Nigoglia

The Strona (Italian pronunciation: [ˈstroːna]) is a mountain torrent in the Province of Verbano Cusio Ossola, northern Italy, a tributary of the Toce. It rises from a small lake near Monte Capezzone at an elevation of 2,100 metres (6,900 ft) and runs through the Valle Strona (the communes of Valstrona, Massiola, Quarna Sopra, Loreglia, Germagno, Omegna, Casale Corte Cerro and Gravellona Toce) before entering the Toce. At Omegna it is joined by the Nigoglia, the outlet of Lago d’Orta.
