= Sambughetto =

- Frazione
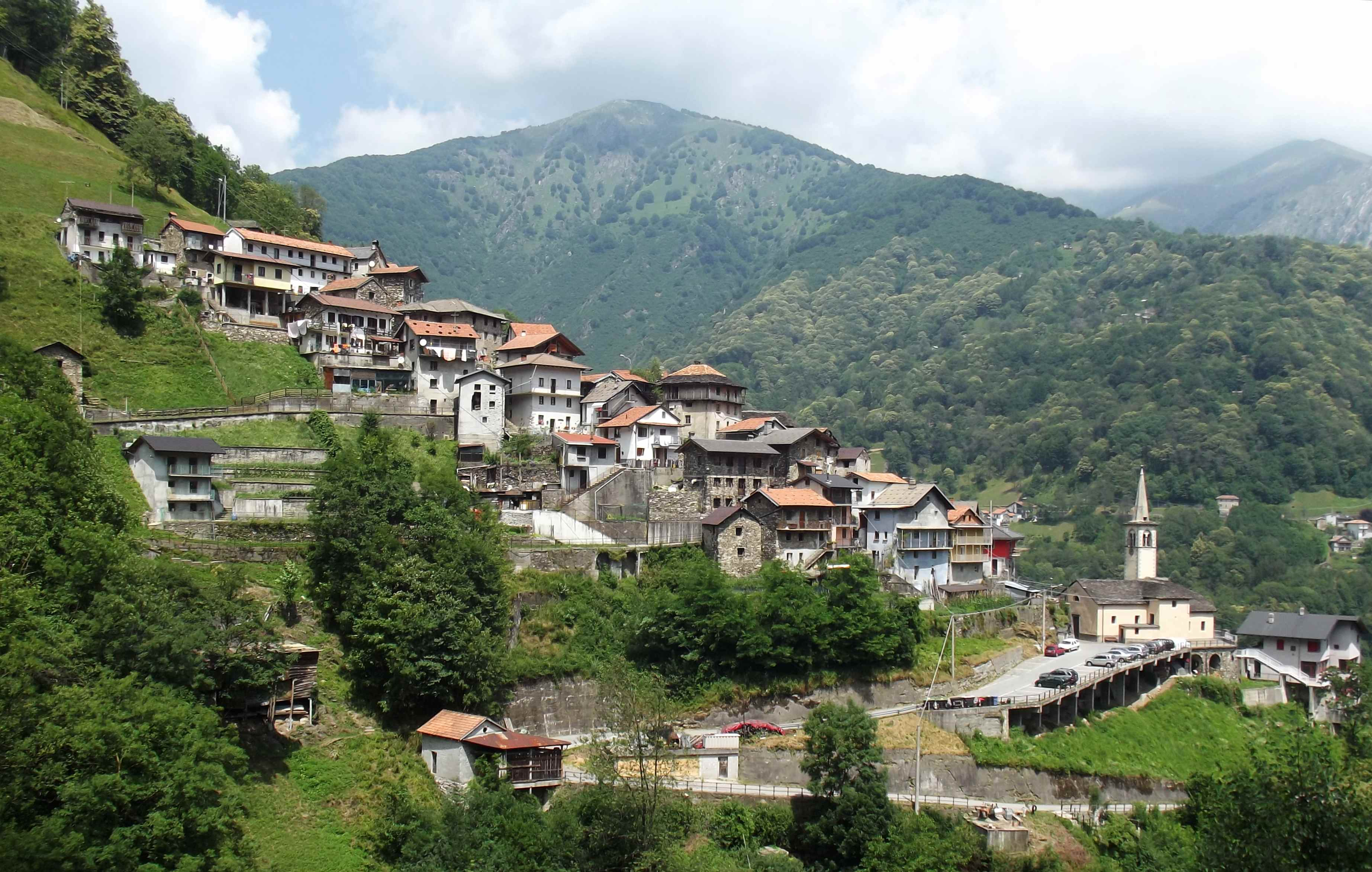

- Location of Sambughetto in Italy
- Coordinates: 45°54′22″N 8°18′45″E
- Country: Italy
- Region: Piedmont
- Province: Verbano-Cusio-Ossola (VB)
- Comune: Valstrona
- Elevation: 759 m (2,490 ft)

Population (2001)
  - Total: 67
- Time zone: UTC+1 (CET)
  - Summer (DST): UTC+2 (CEST)
- Postal code: 28897
- Dialing code: (+39) 0323

Sambughetto is a frazione (and parish) of the municipality of Valstrona, in Piedmont, northern Italy.

== Overview ==
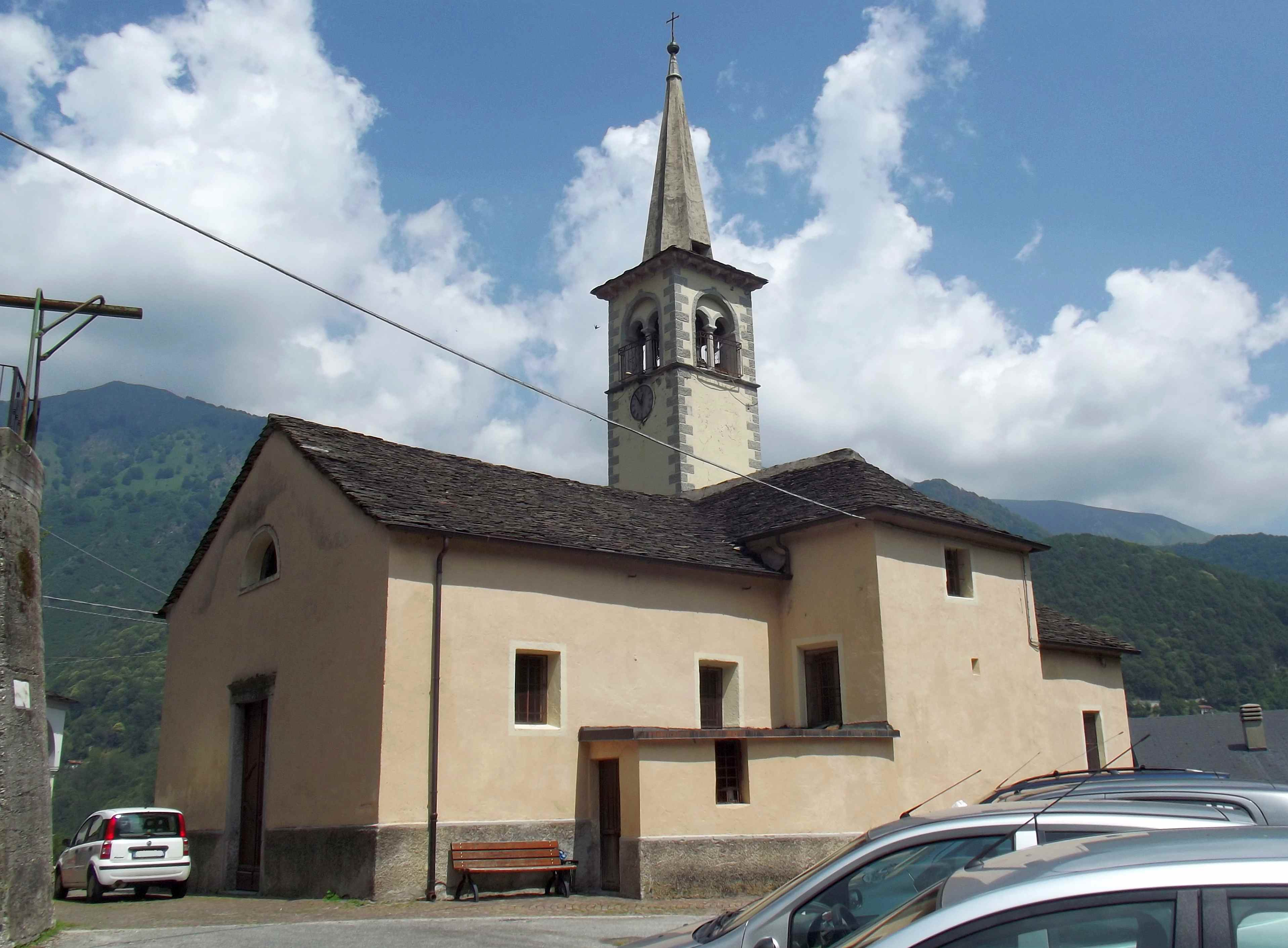
The parish church of St Laurent

It is a village located some km from the main road of the Valle Strona, on the left side of Strona river. Near the village are located several interesting natural caves where remains of ursus spelaeus have been found.

Since 1928 it was a separate comune (municipality).
