= Capezzone =

Capezzone may refer to:

- Daniele Capezzone (born 1972), Italian journalist and former politician
- Monte Capezzone, mountain in the Pennine Alps of north-western Italy
