= Quarna Sotto =

- Comune
- Comune di Quarna Sotto
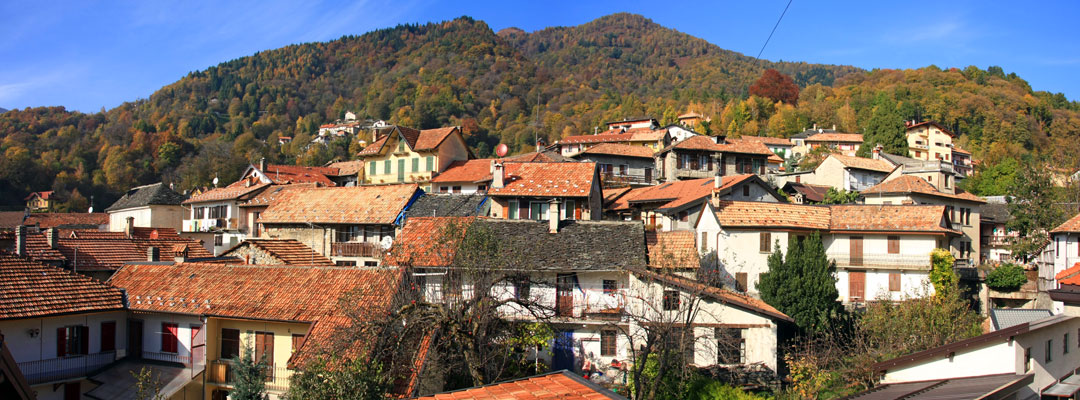

- Location within Italy Location within Piedmont
- Coordinates: 45°52′N 8°21′E
- Country: Italy
- Region: Piedmont
- Province: Verbano-Cusio-Ossola (VB)

Government
  - Mayor: Paolo Gromme

Area
  - Total: 16.05 km^{2} (6.20 sq mi)
- Elevation: 802 m (2,631 ft)

Population (31 December 2014)
  - Total: 399
  - Density: 24.9/km^{2} (64.4/sq mi)
- Demonym: Quarnesi
- Time zone: UTC+1 (CET)
  - Summer (DST): UTC+2 (CEST)
- Postal code: 28896
- Dialing code: 0323
- Website: Official website

Quarna Sotto is a comune (municipality) in the Province of Verbano-Cusio-Ossola in the Italian region Piedmont. It is located about 100 kilometres (62 mi) northeast of Turin and about 15 kilometres (9 mi) southwest of Verbania.

Quarna Sotto borders the following municipalities: Nonio, Omegna, Quarna Sopra, Valstrona, Varallo Sesia.
