= Fobello =

- Comune
- Comune di Fobello
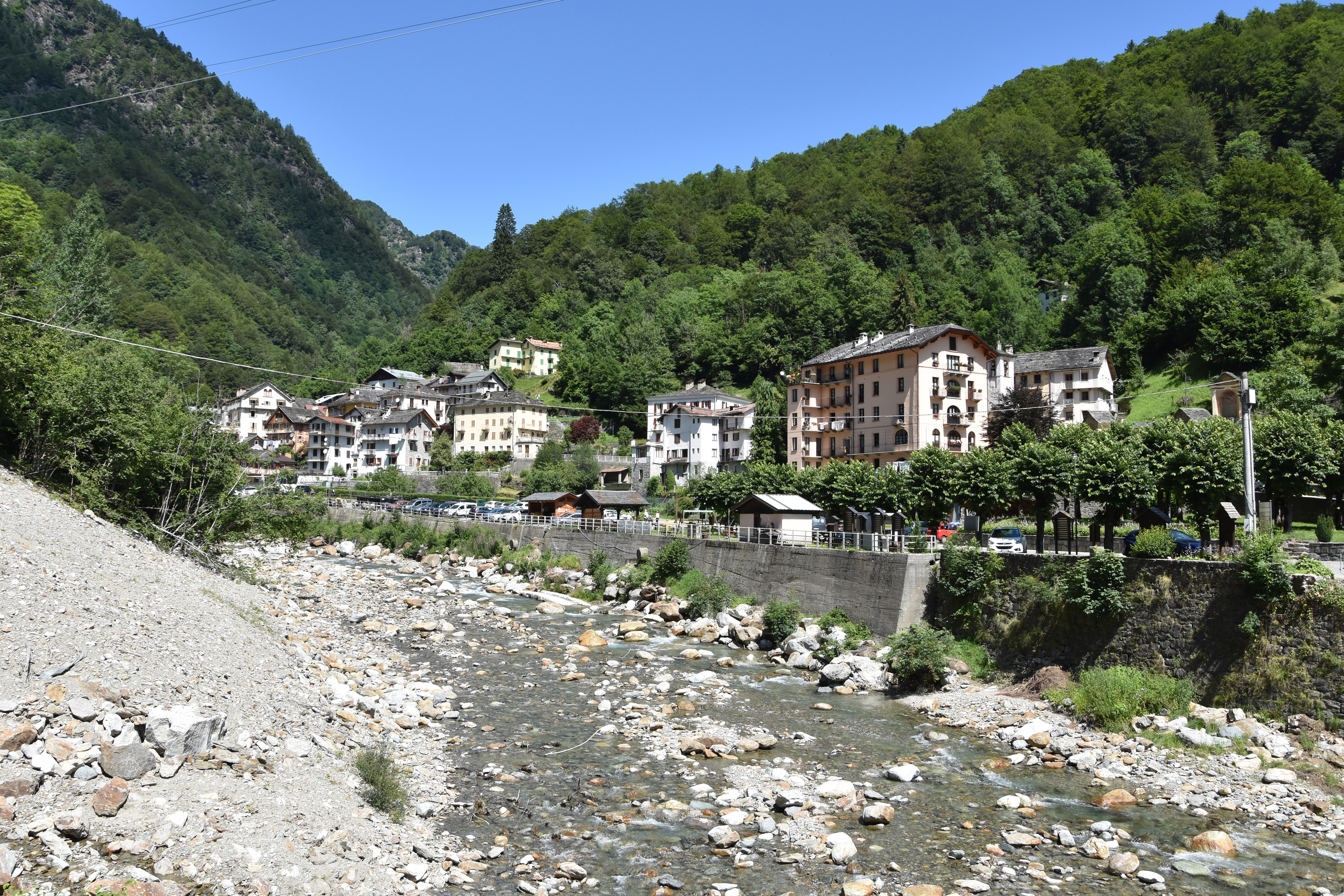

- Location within Italy Location within Piedmont
- Coordinates: 45°53′N 8°10′E
- Country: Italy
- Region: Piedmont
- Province: Vercelli (VC)

Government
  - Mayor: Gianluigi Locatelli

Area
  - Total: 28.14 km^{2} (10.86 sq mi)
- Elevation: 880 m (2,890 ft)

Population (28 February 2017)
  - Total: 194
  - Density: 6.89/km^{2} (17.9/sq mi)
- Demonym: Fobellesi
- Time zone: UTC+1 (CET)
  - Summer (DST): UTC+2 (CEST)
- Postal code: 13025
- Dialing code: 0163
- Website: Official website

Fobello is a comune (municipality) in the Province of Vercelli in the Italian region Piedmont, located about 100 kilometres (62 mi) northeast of Turin and about 70 kilometres (43 mi) northwest of Vercelli.

Fobello borders the following municipalities: Alto Sermenza, Bannio Anzino, Carcoforo, Cervatto, Cravagliana, Rimella, and Rossa.

The automotive engineers Vincenzo Lancia (1881–1937) and his son Gianni Lancia (1924–2014) were from Fobello.
