= Casale Corte Cerro =

- Comune
- Comune di Casale Corte Cerro
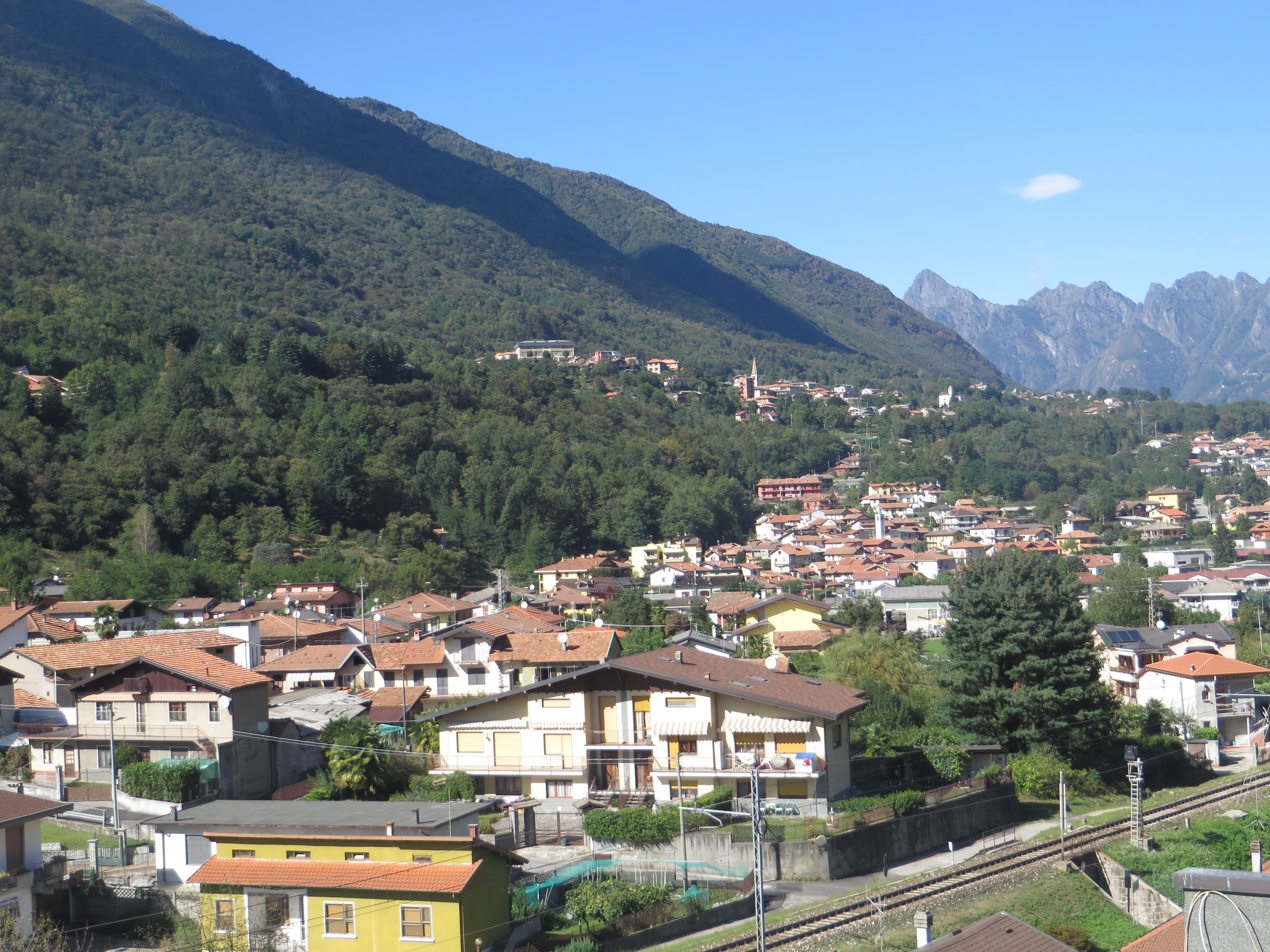

- Location within Italy Location within Piedmont
- Coordinates: 45°55′N 8°25′E
- Country: Italy
- Region: Piedmont
- Province: Verbano-Cusio-Ossola (VB)
- Frazioni: Arzo, Cafferonio, Cassinone, Cereda, Crebbia, Crottofantone, Gabbio, Montebuglio, Motto, Pramore, Ramate, Ricciano, Sant'Anna, Tanchello

Government
  - Mayor: Claudio Pizzi

Area
  - Total: 12.1 km^{2} (4.7 sq mi)
- Elevation: 372 m (1,220 ft)

Population (Dec. 2004)
  - Total: 3,403
  - Density: 281/km^{2} (728/sq mi)
- Demonym: Casalesi
- Time zone: UTC+1 (CET)
  - Summer (DST): UTC+2 (CEST)
- Postal code: 28881
- Dialing code: 0323
- Website: Official website

Casale Corte Cerro is a comune (municipality) in the Province of Verbano-Cusio-Ossola in the Italian region Piedmont, located about 110 kilometres (68 mi) northeast of Turin and about 9 kilometres (6 mi) west of Verbania. It was part of the Mountain Community of Strona and Basso Toce until 2010 when it merged with the Mountain community Due Laghi, Cusio, Mottarone and Strona, which ceased to exist in 2012. Today the town is part of the mountain union of Cusio and Mottarone.

Casale Corte Cerro borders the following municipalities: Germagno, Gravellona Toce, Loreglia, Omegna, Ornavasso.
