= Luigi Sculli =

Italian footballer (1921–1959)

Personal information
- Date of birth: 15 September 1921
- Place of birth: Omegna, Kingdom of Italy
- Height: 1.80 m (5 ft 11 in)
- Position: Goalkeeper

Senior career*
Years	Team	Apps	(Gls)
1938–1939	Omegna		
1939–1941	Ambrosiana-Inter	3	(0)
1943–1944	Galliatese		
1944–1945	Vigevano		
1945–1946	Vogherese		
1946–1947	Savona	2	(0)
- * Club domestic league appearances and goals

Luigi Sculli (15 September 1921 in Omegna–1959) was an Italian professional football player.
