= Cervatto =

- Comune
- Comune di Cervatto
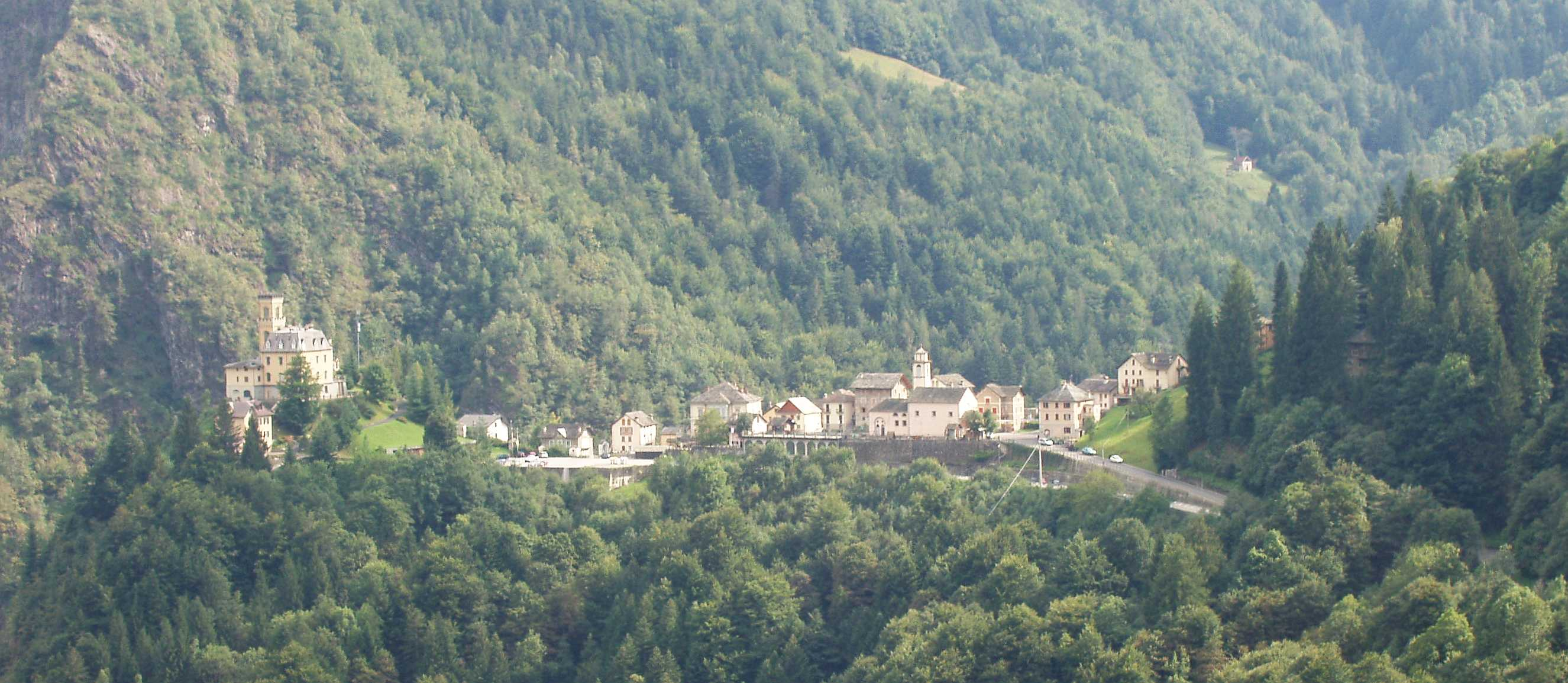

- Coat of arms

- Location within Italy Location within Piedmont
- Coordinates: 45°53′N 8°10′E
- Country: Italy
- Region: Piedmont
- Province: Province of Vercelli (VC)

Area
  - Total: 9.4 km^{2} (3.6 sq mi)

Population (Dec. 2004)
  - Total: 48
  - Density: 5.1/km^{2} (13/sq mi)
- Time zone: UTC+1 (CET)
  - Summer (DST): UTC+2 (CEST)
- Postal code: 13025
- Dialing code: 0163

Cervatto is a comune (municipality) in the Province of Vercelli in the Italian region Piedmont, located about 100 kilometres (62 mi) northeast of Turin and about 70 kilometres (43 mi) northwest of Vercelli. As of 31 December 2004, it had a population of 48 and an area of 9.4 square kilometres (3.6 mi^{2}).

Cervatto borders the following municipalities: Cravagliana, Fobello, and Rossa.

== Demographic evolution ==
Historical population

Year	Pop.	±%
1861	205	—
1871	186	−9.3%
1881	169	−9.1%
1901	186	+10.1%
1911	200	+7.5%

Year	Pop.	±%
1921	190	−5.0%
1931	185	−2.6%
1936	160	−13.5%
1951	164	+2.5%
1961	150	−8.5%

Year	Pop.	±%
1971	85	−43.3%
1981	78	−8.2%
1991	51	−34.6%
2001	49	−3.9%

Source: Data from ISTAT
