= Sant'Ambrogio, Omegna =

Building in Omegna, Italy

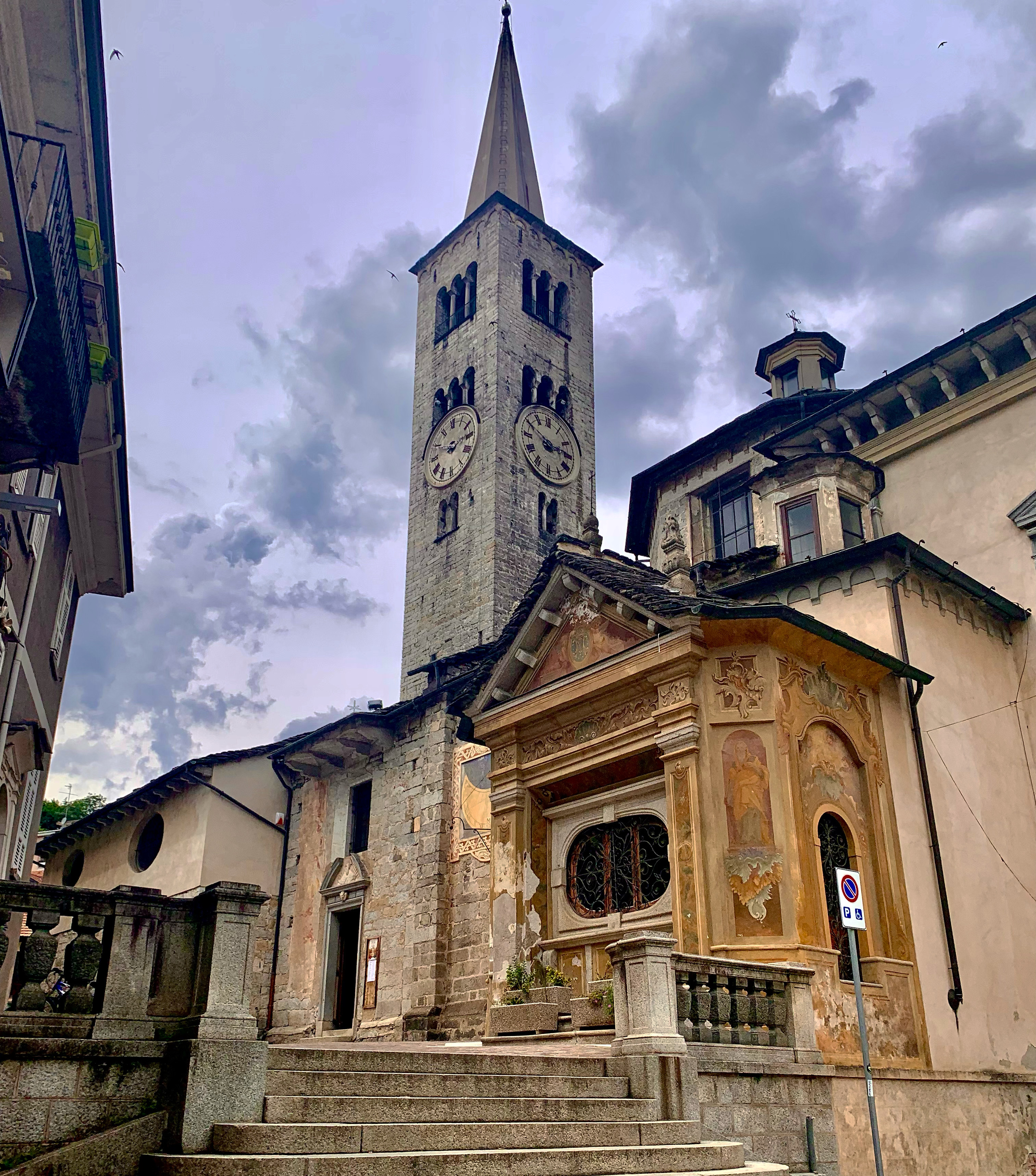

The Church of Saint Ambrose (Italian: Chiesa di Sant'Ambrogio), also known as the Chiesa collegiata di Sant'Ambrogio, is a Roman Catholic church in Omegna, Province of Verbano-Cusio-Ossola, Piedmont, Italy. It belongs to the Diocese of Novara.

The original church in Omegna was built in the 10th century. The building was then enlarged and renovated around 1470, as confirmed by the date engraved on the side entrance portal. The parish church was remodeled again during the Baroque period, and then underwent further restoration in the 1920s.
