= Rossa, Piedmont =

Rossa
- Comune
- Comune di Rossa
- Coat of arms

- Location within Italy Location within Piedmont
- Coordinates: 45°50′N 8°9′E
- Country: Italy
- Region: Piedmont
- Province: Province of Vercelli (VC)

Area
  - Total: 11.6 km^{2} (4.5 sq mi)
- Elevation: 813 m (2,667 ft)

Population (31 December 2015)
  - Total: 180
  - Density: 16/km^{2} (40/sq mi)
- Demonym: Rossesi
- Time zone: UTC+1 (CET)
  - Summer (DST): UTC+2 (CEST)
- Postal code: 13020
- Dialing code: 0164
- Patron saint: Assumption of Mary
- Saint day: 15 August
- Website: Official website

Rossa is a comune (municipality) in the Province of Vercelli in the Italian region Piedmont, located about 90 kilometres (56 mi) northeast of Turin and about 60 kilometres (37 mi) northwest of Vercelli.

Rossa borders the following municipalities: Alto Sermenza, Balmuccia, Boccioleto, Cervatto, Cravagliana and Fobello.
