= Nigoglia =

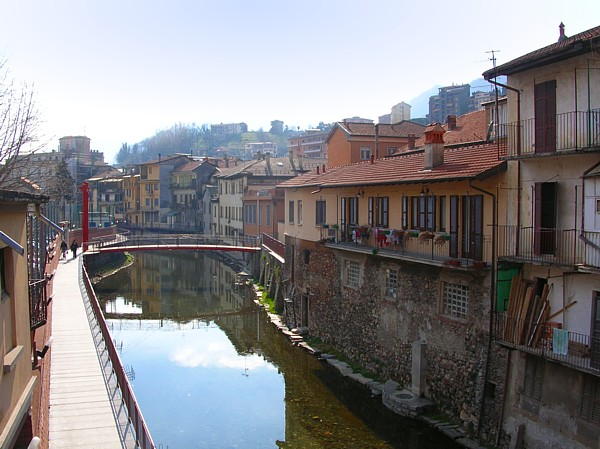
- The Nigoglia at Omegna
- Native name: Nigoeuja; Nigòja (Lombard); Nigheuja (Piedmontese)

Location
- Country: Italy

Physical characteristics
- Source
  - location: Lake Orta
  - elevation: 295 m (968 ft)
- Mouth: Strona
  - coordinates: 45.8835°N 8.4105°E
- Length: less than 2 km (1.2 mi)

Basin features
- Progression: Strona→ Toce→ Lake Maggiore→ Ticino→ Po→ Adriatic Sea

The Nigoglia (Lombard: Nigoeuja or Nigòja; Piedmontese: Nigheuja) is a short Italian river whose source is at the northern end of Lake Orta, of which it is the sole outflow. Its course of less than 2 kilometres passes in a northerly direction through the town of Omegna and into the Strona.

As a rule, the outflows of Italy's major subalpine lakes run in a southerly direction, down to the plains of the Po Valley. The Nigoglia is the exception, seeming to run "upwards" towards the high Alps. This peculiarity gave rise to a motto in the local dialect which is posted on the Omegna town hall, and which is quoted at the end of Gianni Rodari's children's story C'era due volte il barone Lamberto:

"La Nigoeuja la va in su; e la legg la fèm nu!"

Translation:

"The Nigoglia runs upwards, and we make our own laws!"
