= Alpi Cusiane =

Mountain range in Italy

- Prealpi Cusiane
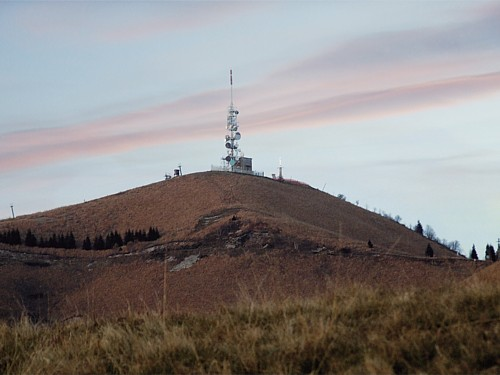
- Mottarone summit

Highest point
- Peak: Cima Altemberg
- Elevation: 2,395 m (7,858 ft)
- Coordinates: 45°56′10″N 8°12′13″E

Geography
- Location within Alps
- Country: Italy
- Region/Provinces: Piedmont, Novara, Verbano-Cusio-Ossola and Vercelli
- Rivers: Ticino, Sesia and Agogna
- Settlement(s): Omegna, Stresa, Arona
- Parent range: Pennine Alps

Geology
- Orogeny: Alpine orogeny

The Alpi Cusiane (or Prealpi Cusiane) are a sub-range of the Pennine Alps located in Piemonte (Italy).

== Etymology ==
Alpi Cusiane literally means Alps of Cusio; Cusio is the geographical and historical area surrounding Lake of Orta, nowadays part of the province of Verbano-Cusio-Ossola.

== Geography ==
Administratively the westernmost part of the range belongs to the province of Vercelli, the southern part to province of Novara and the eastern and central ones to province of Verbano-Cusio-Ossola.

=== Borders ===
Borders of the Alpi Cusiane are (clockwise):

- Varallo Sesia, Mastallone creek, Tesslu pass, Strona creek, Gravellona Toce (north),
- Lago Maggiore (east),
- Po plain between Arona and Gattinara (south),
- Valsesia from Gattinara to Varallo Sesia (west).

=== SOIUSA classification ===
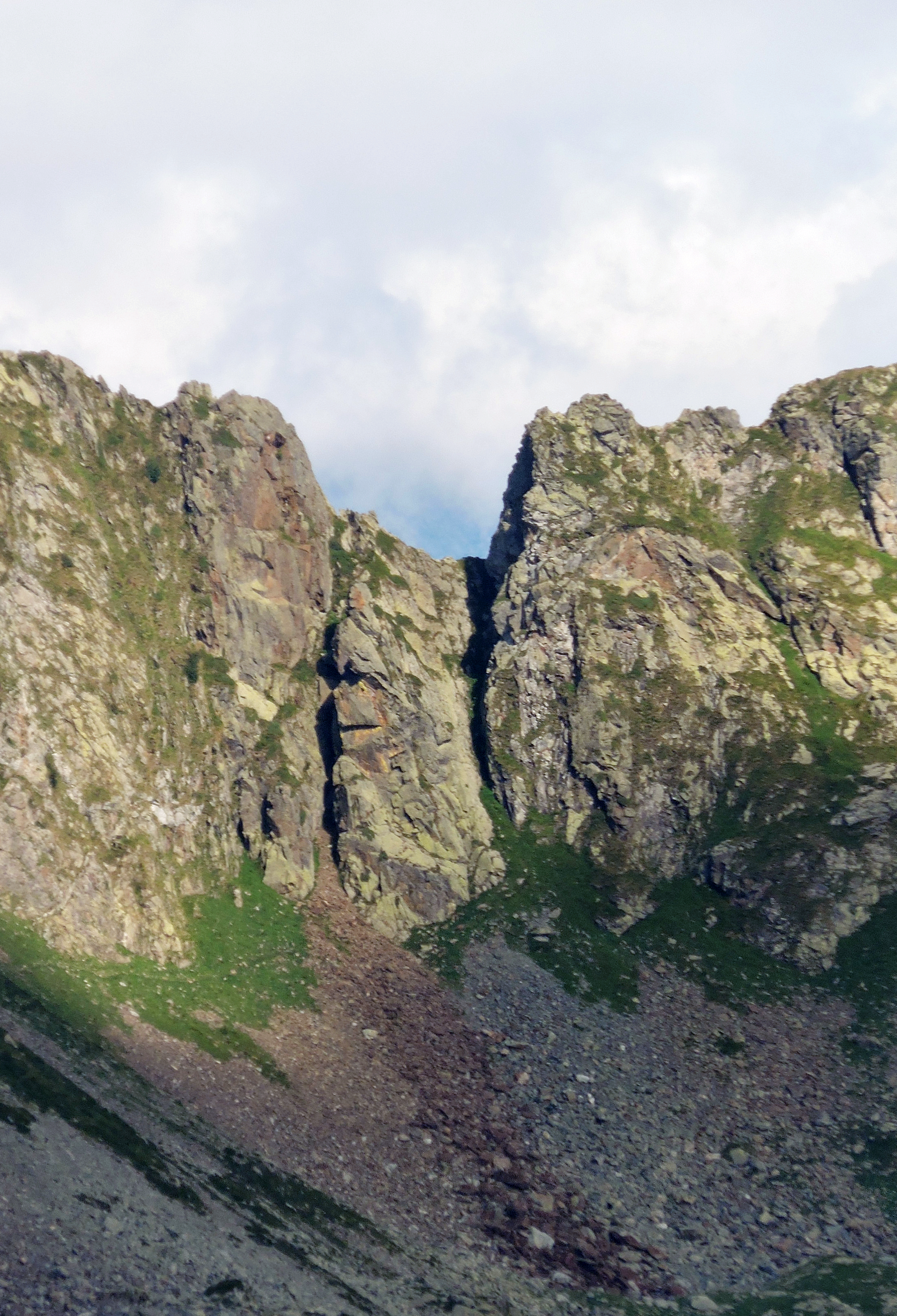
Tesslu pass

According to SOIUSA (International Standardized Mountain Subdivision of the Alps) the mountain range is an Alpine supergroup classified in the following way:

- main part = Western Alps
- major sector = North-Western Alps
- section = Pennine Alps
- subsection = Southern Valsesia Alps
- supergroup =Alpi Cusiane
- code = I/B-9.IV-B

=== Subdivision ===
The Alpi Cusiane are divided into two Alpine groups, none of them further subdivided in subgroups (in brackets is reported their SOIUSA code):

- costiera Capio-Massa del Turlo ( I/B-9.IV-B.1)
- massiccio del Mottarone ( I/B-9.IV-B.2)

These two groups are connected by a low saddle not faraway from Gozzano.

== Geology ==
From the geological point of view the Alpi Cusiane are considered part of the Prealpine zone, divided from the crystalline zone of the Alps by the Insubric line. This important geologic fault forms the border between the Adriatic Plate and the European Plate. Hills and mountains located south-east of the line, like the Alpi Cusiane, can be considered part of southern Apulian foreland.

== Notable summits ==
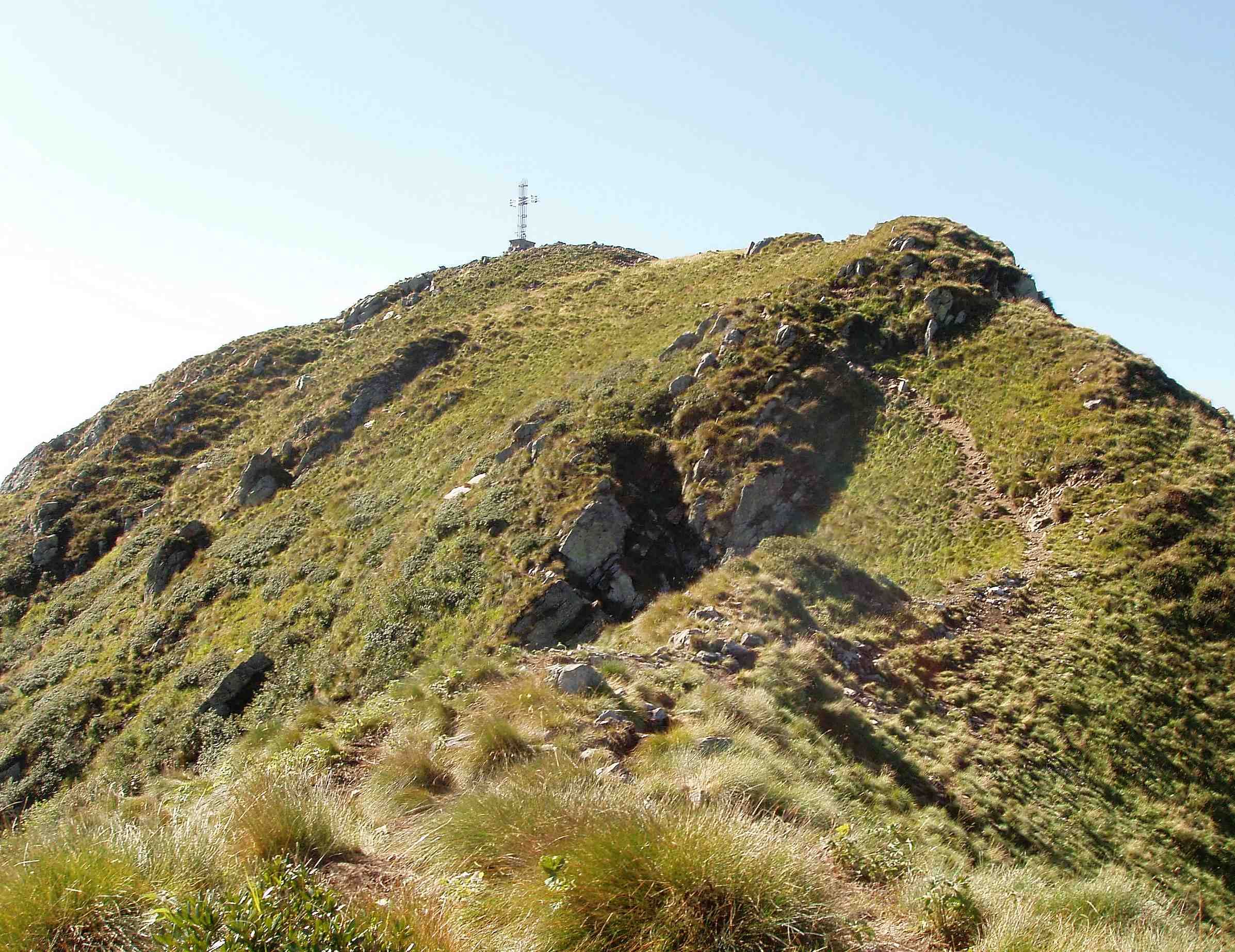
Massa del Turlo

Name	metres
Cima Altemberg	2,395
Monte Capio	2,172
Massa del Turlo	1,960
Mottarone	1,491

== Winter sports ==
In the Alpi Cusiane is located the ski resort of Mottarone, with 21 km of downhill skiing slopes; it's connected with Stresa by a cableway.

== Maps ==
- Italian official cartography (Istituto Geografico Militare - IGM); on-line version: www.pcn.minambiente.it
- I.G.C. (Istituto Geografico Centrale) - Carta dei sentieri e dei rifugi scala 1:50.000 n. 12 Laghi Maggiore d'Orta e di Varese
