= Cravagliana =

- Comune
- Comune di Cravagliana
- Coat of arms

- Location within Italy Location within Piedmont
- Coordinates: 45°51′N 8°12′E
- Country: Italy
- Region: Piedmont
- Province: Vercelli (VC)

Government
  - Mayor: Monica Leone

Area
  - Total: 34.5 km^{2} (13.3 sq mi)
- Elevation: 615 m (2,018 ft)

Population (Dec. 2004)
  - Total: 273
  - Density: 7.91/km^{2} (20.5/sq mi)
- Demonym: Cravaglianesi
- Time zone: UTC+1 (CET)
  - Summer (DST): UTC+2 (CEST)
- Postal code: 13020
- Dialing code: 0163
- Patron saint: Mary
- Saint day: 15 August

Cravagliana is a comune (municipality) in the Province of Vercelli in the Italian region Piedmont, located about 100 kilometres (62 mi) northeast of Turin and about 60 kilometres (37 mi) northwest of Vercelli.

Cravagliana borders the following municipalities: Balmuccia, Cervatto, Fobello, Rimella, Rossa, Sabbia, Valstrona, Varallo Sesia, and Vocca.
