= Germagno =

- Comune
- Comune di Germagno
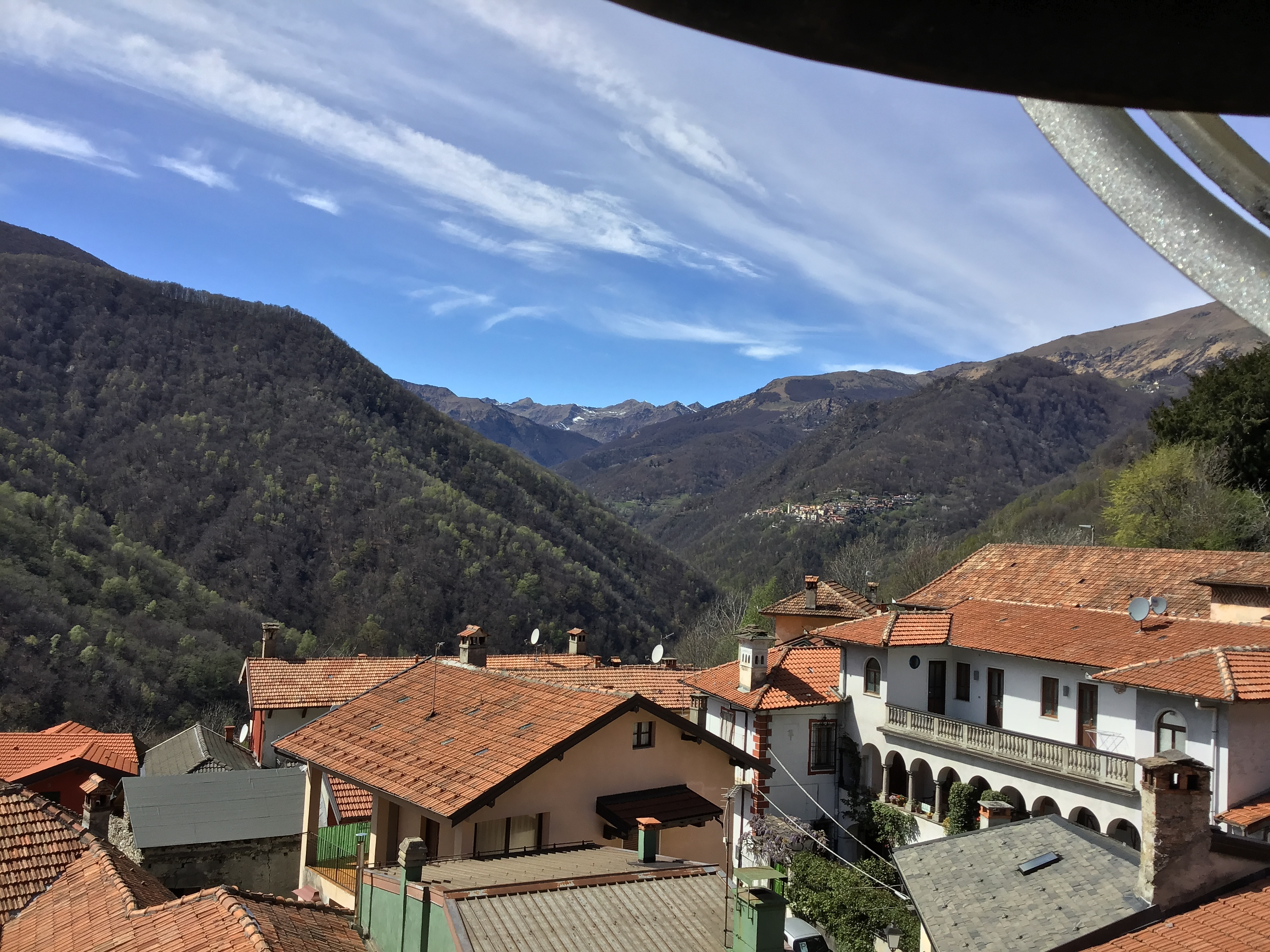

- Location within Italy Location within Piedmont
- Coordinates: 45°53′N 8°23′E
- Country: Italy
- Region: Piedmont
- Province: Verbano-Cusio-Ossola (VB)

Government
  - Mayor: Sebastiano Pizzi

Area
  - Total: 2.9 km^{2} (1.1 sq mi)
- Elevation: 602 m (1,975 ft)

Population (Dec. 2004)
  - Total: 205
  - Density: 71/km^{2} (180/sq mi)
- Demonym: Germagnesi
- Time zone: UTC+1 (CET)
  - Summer (DST): UTC+2 (CEST)
- Postal code: 28887
- Dialing code: 0323
- Website: Official website

Germagno is a comune (municipality) in the Province of Verbano-Cusio-Ossola in the Italian region Piedmont, located about 110 kilometres (68 mi) northeast of Turin and about 9 kilometres (6 mi) west of Verbania.

Germagno borders the following municipalities: Casale Corte Cerro, Loreglia, Omegna, Quarna Sopra.
