= Quarna Sopra =

- Comune
- Comune di Quarna Sopra
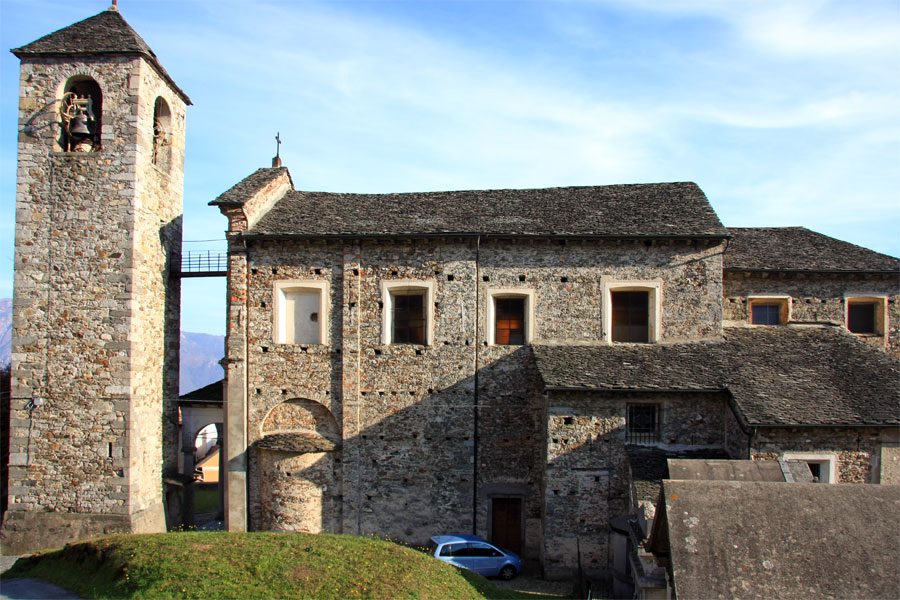

- Location within Italy Location within Piedmont
- Coordinates: 45°52′N 8°22′E
- Country: Italy
- Region: Piedmont
- Province: Verbano-Cusio-Ossola (VB)

Government
  - Mayor: Augusto Quaretta

Area
  - Total: 9.5 km^{2} (3.7 sq mi)
- Elevation: 860 m (2,820 ft)

Population (Dec. 2004)
  - Total: 302
  - Density: 32/km^{2} (82/sq mi)
- Demonym: Quarnesi
- Time zone: UTC+1 (CET)
  - Summer (DST): UTC+2 (CEST)
- Postal code: 28020
- Dialing code: 0323
- Website: Official website

Quarna Sopra is a comune (municipality) in the Province of Verbano-Cusio-Ossola in the Italian region Piedmont, located about 75 kilometres (47 mi) from Malpensa Airport in Milan, 140 kilometres (87 mi) northeast of Turin and about 15 kilometres (9 mi) southwest of Verbania.

Quarna Sopra borders the following municipalities: Germagno, Loreglia, Omegna, Quarna Sotto, Valstrona.

Sights include the Belvedere, a balcony over the Lake Orta with a view of all the surrounding area.
