= Loreglia =

- Comune
- Comune di Loreglia
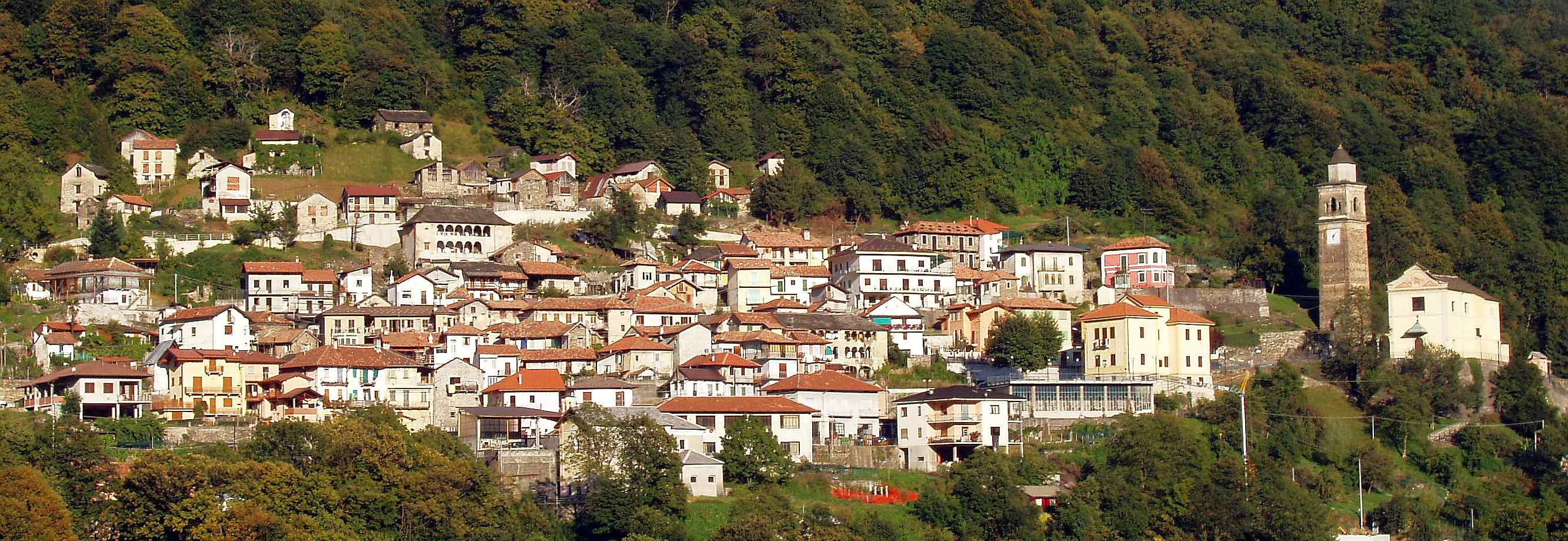

- Location within Italy Location within Piedmont
- Coordinates: 45°53′N 8°27′E
- Country: Italy
- Region: Piedmont
- Province: Province of Verbano-Cusio-Ossola (VB)
- Frazioni: Chesio

Area
  - Total: 9.2 km^{2} (3.6 sq mi)

Population (Dec. 2004)
  - Total: 279
  - Density: 30/km^{2} (79/sq mi)
- Time zone: UTC+1 (CET)
  - Summer (DST): UTC+2 (CEST)
- Postal code: 28020
- Dialing code: 0323
- Website: Official website

Loreglia is a comune (municipality) in the Province of Verbano-Cusio-Ossola in the Italian region Piedmont, located about 110 kilometres (68 mi) northeast of Turin and about 9 kilometres (6 mi) southwest of Verbania. As of 31 December 2004, it had a population of 279 and an area of 9.2 square kilometres (3.6 mi^{2}).

Loreglia borders the following municipalities: Casale Corte Cerro, Germagno, Ornavasso, Quarna Sopra, Valstrona.

== Demographic evolution ==
Historical population

Year	Pop.	±%
1861	599	—
1871	512	−14.5%
1881	481	−6.1%
1901	424	−11.9%
1911	489	+15.3%

Year	Pop.	±%
1921	526	+7.6%
1931	542	+3.0%
1936	546	+0.7%
1951	586	+7.3%
1961	524	−10.6%

Year	Pop.	±%
1971	522	−0.4%
1981	440	−15.7%
1991	357	−18.9%
2001	283	−20.7%

Source: Data from ISTAT
