= Sabbia =

- Frazione
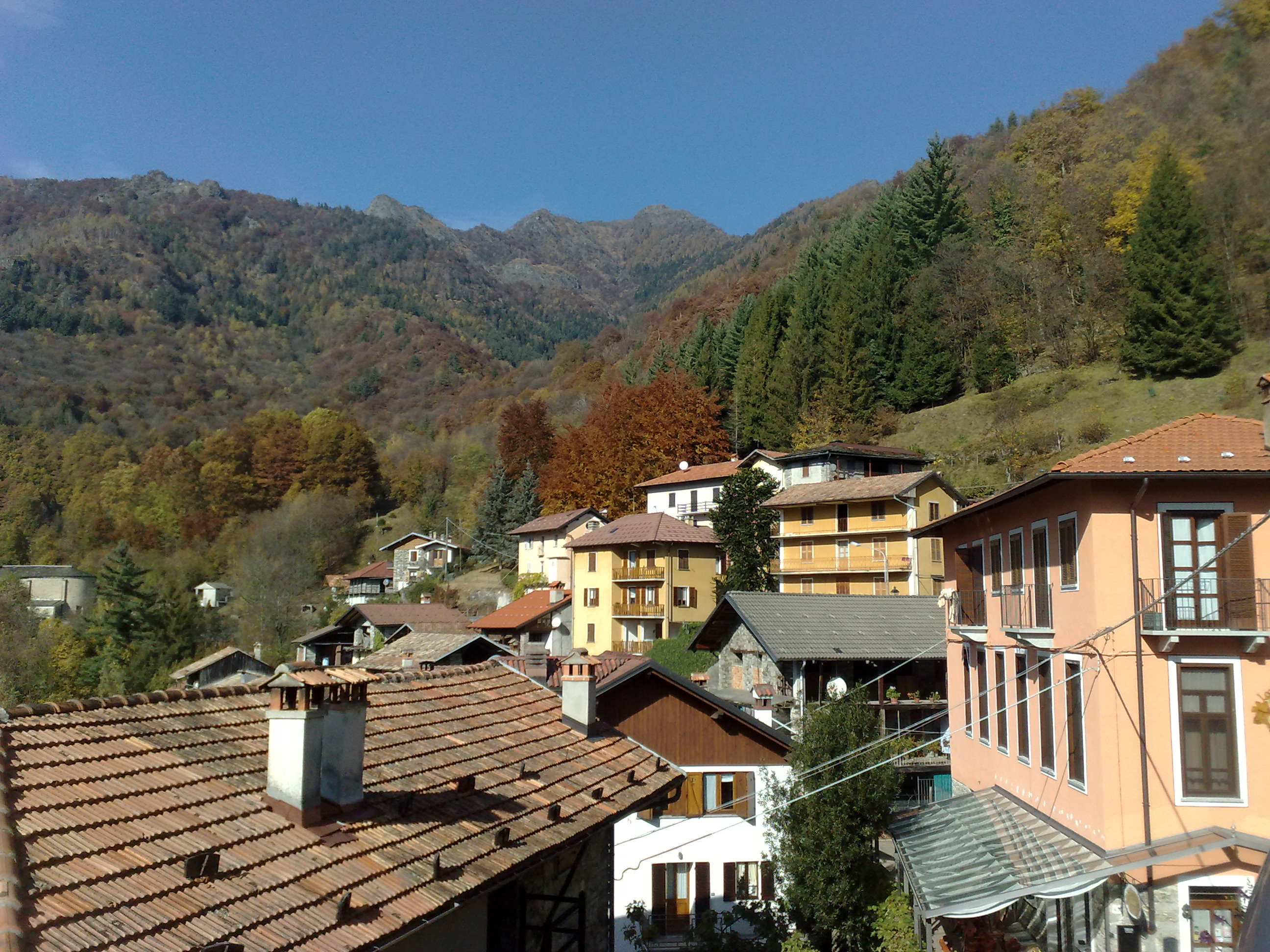

- Location of Sabbia in Italy
- Coordinates: 45°51′N 8°14′E
- Country: Italy
- Region: Piedmont
- Province: Province of Vercelli (VC)
- Comune: Varallo

Area
  - Total: 14.5 km^{2} (5.6 sq mi)

Population (Dec. 2004)
  - Total: 78
  - Density: 5.4/km^{2} (14/sq mi)
- Time zone: UTC+1 (CET)
  - Summer (DST): UTC+2 (CEST)
- Postal code: 13020
- Dialing code: 0163

Sabbia, Sabine is a frazione of Varallo in the Province of Vercelli in the Italian region Piedmont, located about 100 kilometres (62 mi) northeast of Turin and about 60 kilometres (37 mi) north of Vercelli. As of 31 December 2004, it had a population of 78 and an area of 14.5 square kilometres (5.6 mi^{2}).

Sabbia borders the following municipalities: San Vigilio, Valstrona, and Varallo Sesia.

== Demographic evolution ==
Historical population

Year	Pop.	±%
1861	625	—
1871	696	+11.4%
1881	695	−0.1%
1901	692	−0.4%
1911	711	+2.7%

Year	Pop.	±%
1921	634	−10.8%
1931	541	−14.7%
1936	379	−29.9%
1951	288	−24.0%
1961	220	−23.6%

Year	Pop.	±%
1971	188	−14.5%
1981	149	−20.7%
1991	134	−10.1%
2001	93	−30.6%

Source: Data from ISTAT
