= Rimella =

- Comune
- Comune di Rimella
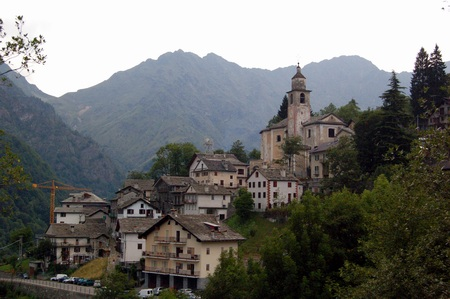

- Location within Italy Location within Piedmont
- Coordinates: 45°54′N 8°11′E
- Country: Italy
- Region: Piedmont
- Province: Vercelli (VC)

Government
  - Mayor: Riccardo Peco

Area
  - Total: 26.27 km^{2} (10.14 sq mi)
- Elevation: 1,176 m (3,858 ft)

Population (1 January 2014)
  - Total: 133
  - Density: 5.06/km^{2} (13.1/sq mi)
- Demonym: Rimellesi
- Time zone: UTC+1 (CET)
  - Summer (DST): UTC+2 (CEST)
- Postal code: 13020
- Dialing code: 0163
- Website: Official website

Rimella (Walser German: Remmalju, Piedmontese: Rimela) is a comune (municipality) in the Province of Vercelli in the Italian region Piedmont, located about 100 kilometres (62 mi) northeast of Turin and about 70 kilometres (43 mi) northwest of Vercelli.

Rimella borders the following municipalities: Bannio Anzino, Calasca-Castiglione, Cravagliana, Fobello, and Valstrona.

== Population ==
Founded in 1255 by Walser emigrants from Visperterminen in the now Swiss Valais, its population is traditionally Alemannic German speaking. From 1871 on, when Rimella had a population of 1327, the number of inhabitants has dramatically diminished. As of 31 December 2004, it had a population of 129.

== Sources ==
- Marco Bauen: Sprachgemischter Mundartausdruck in Rimella (Valsesia, Piemaont). Zur Syntax eines südwalserischen Dialekts im Spannungsfeld der italienischen Landes- und Kultursprache, Berne and Stuttgart 1978. – Translated into Italian in 1999 by Eugenio Vasina.
- Paolo Sibilla: Una comunità Walser delle Alpi. Strutture tradizionali e processi culturali, Florence 1980.
- Centro Studi Walser (Ed.): Ts Remmaljertittschu. Vocabolario Italiano – Tittschu, Turin 1995. Vocabolario Tittschu – Italiano, Borgosesia 2005.
- Centro Studi Walser (Ed.): Storia di Rimella in Valsesia, Ravenna 2004.
- Silke La Rose: Walser Recht ennetbirgen – Ein Beitrag zu Ursprung und Verlaufsbedingungen der Walserwanderung. Part II: Rimella und Alagna, in: Wir Walser 1 (2006) 7–17.
- Atlante Toponomastico del Piemonte Montano Nr. 31: Rimella. Ed. by the Università degli Studi di Torino and the Region of Piedmont. Turin 2007.
