= Valstrona =

- Comune
- Comune di Valstrona
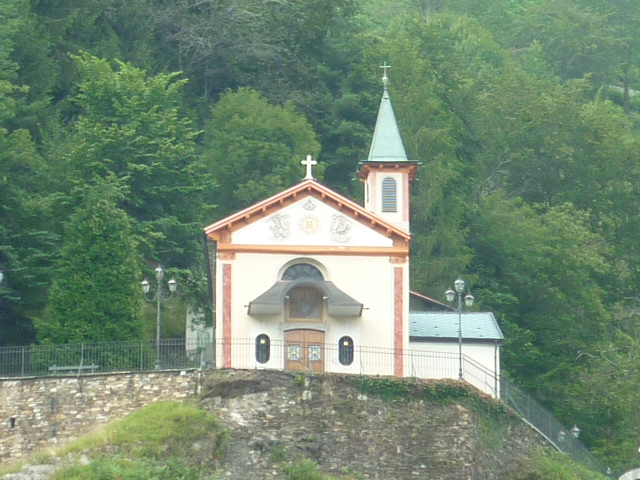
- The Shrine of the Madonna of the Colletta of Luzzogno in Valstrona

- Location within Italy Location within Piedmont
- Coordinates: 45°54′N 8°20′E
- Country: Italy
- Region: Piedmont
- Province: Verbano-Cusio-Ossola (VB)
- Frazioni: Campello Monti, Fornero, Forno, Inuggio, Luzzogno, Otra, Piana di Fornero, Piana di Forno, Preia, Rosarolo, Sambughetto, Strona

Government
  - Mayor: Luca Capotosti

Area
  - Total: 48.8 km^{2} (18.8 sq mi)
- Elevation: 475 m (1,558 ft)

Population (31 December 2010)
  - Total: 1,254
  - Density: 25.7/km^{2} (66.6/sq mi)
- Demonym: Valstronesi
- Time zone: UTC+1 (CET)
  - Summer (DST): UTC+2 (CEST)
- Postal code: 28020
- Dialing code: 0323
- Patron saint: St. Joseph
- Saint day: 19 March
- Website: Official website

Valstrona is a comune (municipality) in the Province of Verbano-Cusio-Ossola in the Italian region Piedmont, located about 90 kilometres (56 mi) northeast of Turin and about 25 kilometres (16 mi) southwest of Verbania.

Valstrona borders the following municipalities: Anzola d'Ossola, Calasca-Castiglione, Cravagliana, Loreglia, Massiola, Ornavasso, Pieve Vergonte, Quarna Sopra, Quarna Sotto, Rimella, Sabbia, Varallo Sesia.
