= Omegna =

- Comune
- Comune di Omegna
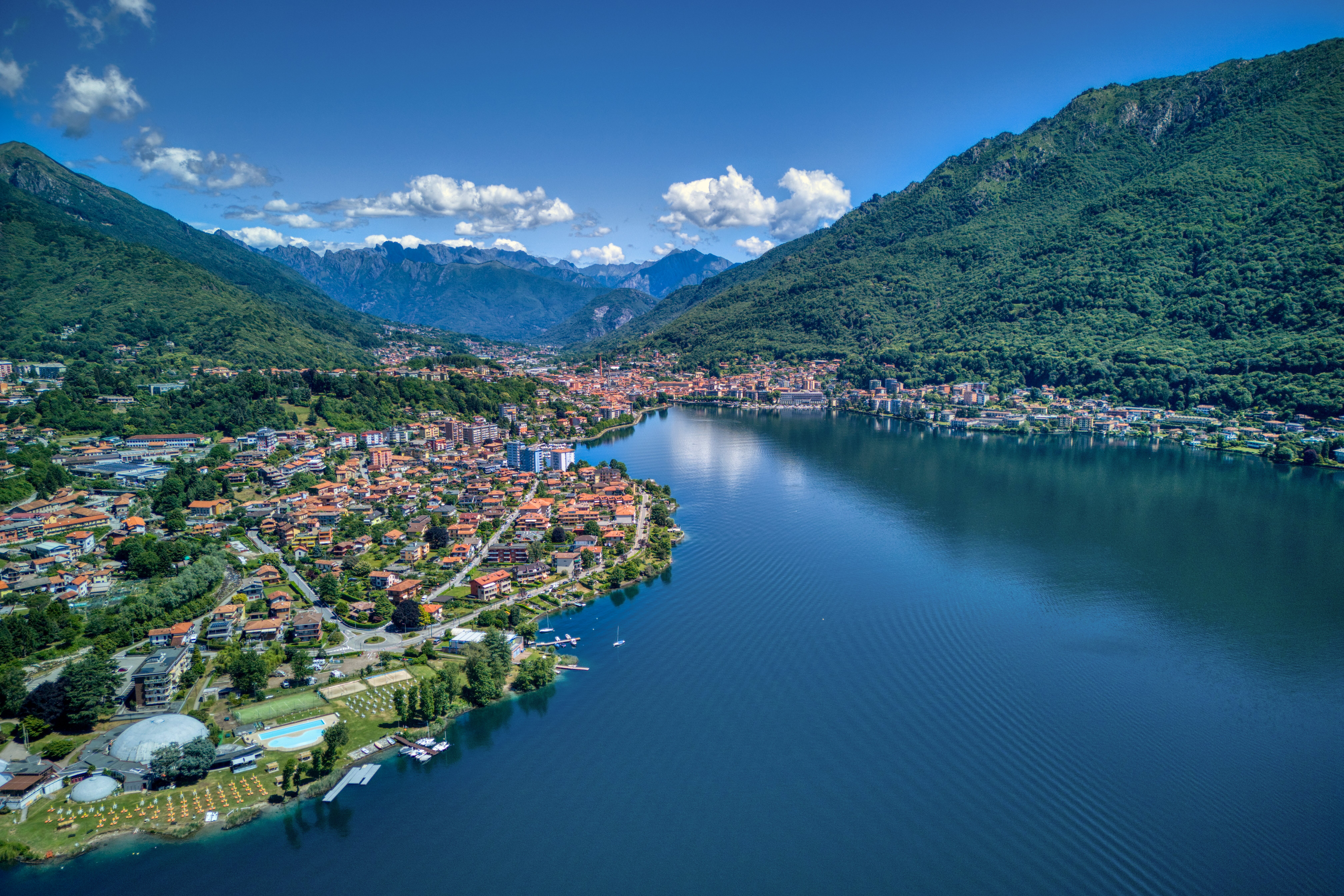

- Coat of arms

- Location within Italy Location within Piedmont
- Coordinates: 45°52′39″N 8°24′32″E
- Country: Italy
- Region: Piedmont
- Province: Verbano-Cusio-Ossola (VB)
- Frazioni: Bagnella, Borca, Crusinallo, Cireggio, Santa Rita, Agrano, Gattugno, Sant'Anna

Government
  - Mayor: Maria Adelaide Mellano (PD)

Area
  - Total: 30.78 km^{2} (11.88 sq mi)
- Elevation: 295 m (968 ft)

Population (31 December 2012)
  - Total: 15,591
  - Density: 506.5/km^{2} (1,312/sq mi)
- Demonym: Omegnesi
- Time zone: UTC+1 (CET)
  - Summer (DST): UTC+2 (CEST)
- Postal code: 28887
- Dialing code: 0323
- Patron saint: Saint Ambrose
- Saint day: 7 December
- Website: Official website

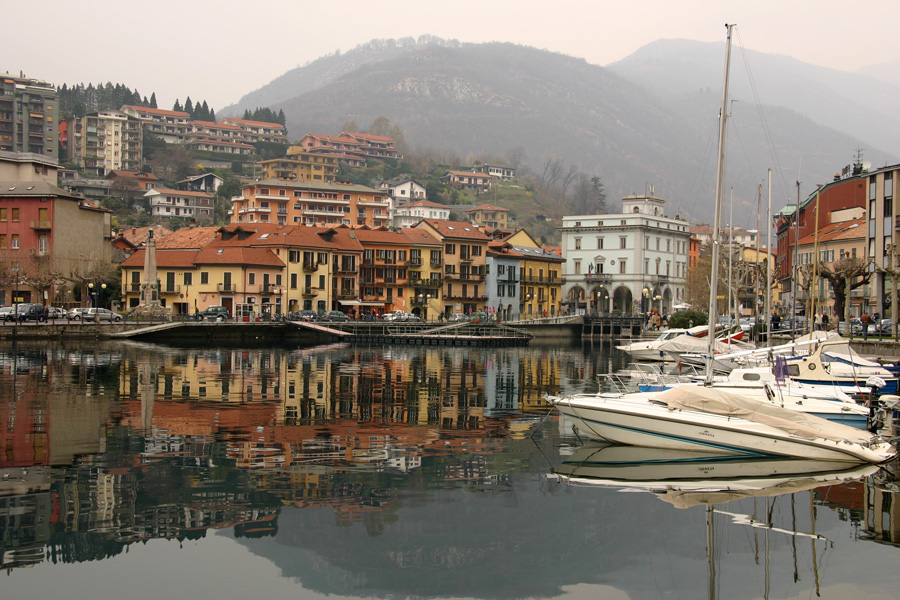
Omegna

Omegna (Italian: [oˈmeɲɲa], Lombard: [uˈmɛɲa], Piedmontese: [ʊˈmɛɲa]) is a comune (municipality) in the Province of Verbano-Cusio-Ossola in the Italian region Piedmont, located about 100 kilometers (62 mi) northeast of Turin and about 13 kilometers (8 mi) southwest of Verbania at the northernmost point of Lago d’Orta and traversed by the Nigoglia, the lake's sole outflow.

A vibrant street market takes place every Thursday morning along the lakeside boulevard. A daily ferry service links Omegna with the surrounding towns and villages along the lake.

== History ==
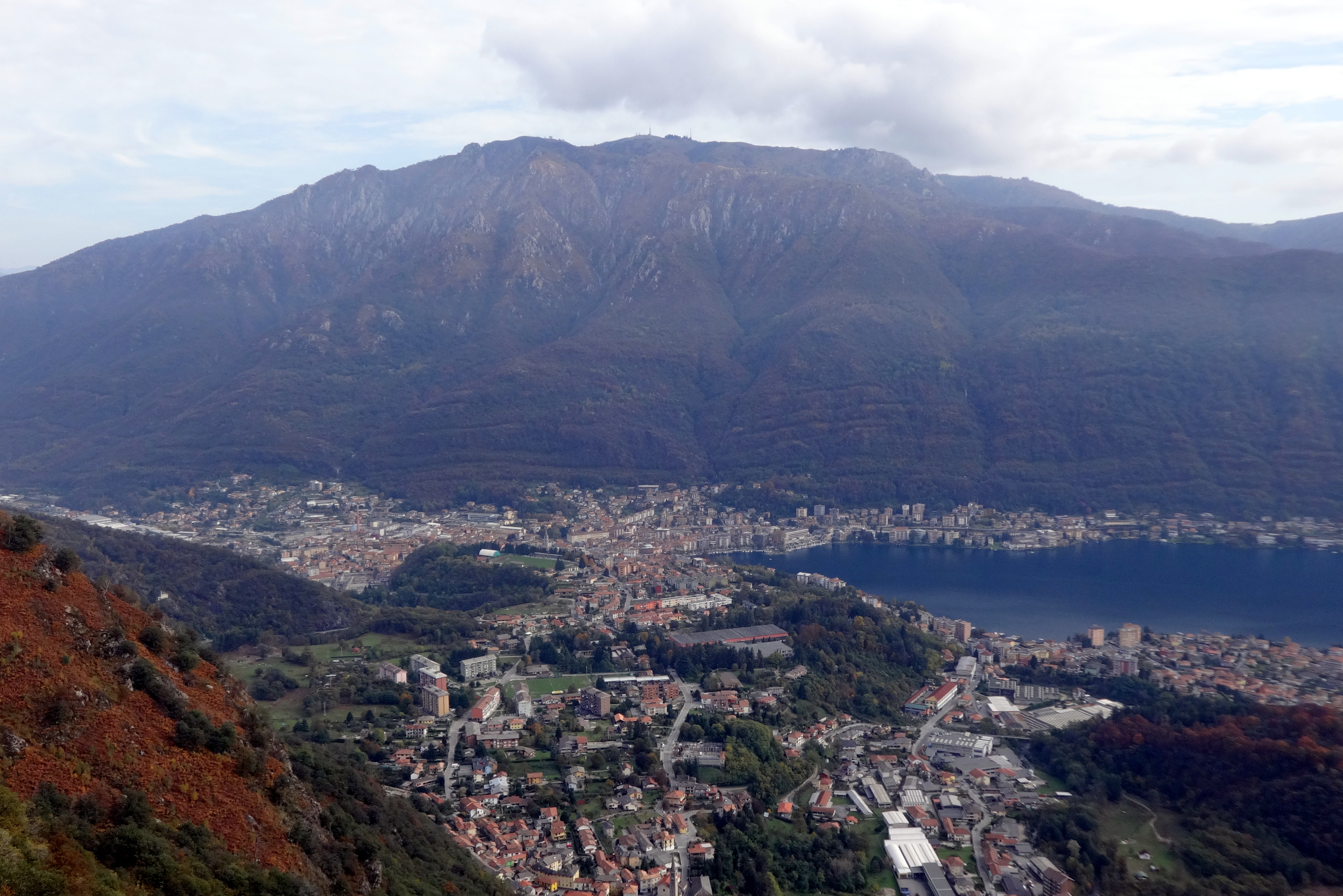
Omegna and Monte Mottarone.

The presence of ancient settlements in the area has been confirmed by excavations conducted in the frazione of Cireggio, with archaeological findings dating back to the late Bronze and Iron Ages. Omegna is first mentioned in 1221 AD, when the population swore allegiance to the commune of Novara.

In the 19th and early 20th centuries, Omegna developed into an industrial center, serving as Italy's primary production hub for pots and small household appliances for many years. During this period, the population grew significantly due to immigration. In 1913 Omegna was connected with Pallanza by an electrical tramway line. It was declared a city in 1939. During World War II, Omegna served as a center for partisan resistance against the German-Fascist occupation.

== Main sights ==
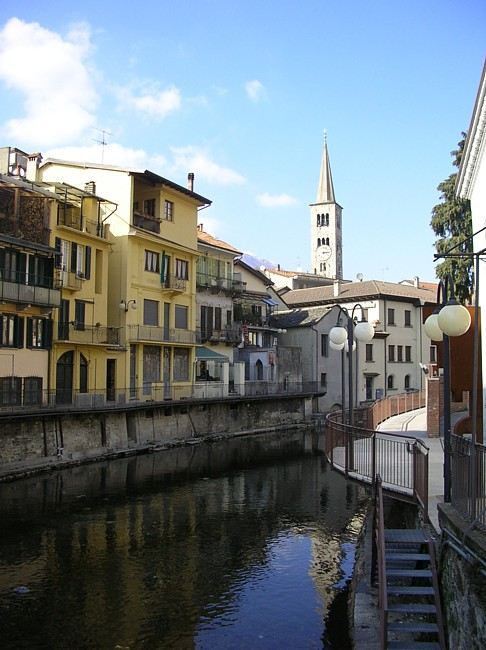
A view of Omegna's city center

- Church of Sant'Ambrogio. It is a late-Romanesque building with a nave and two aisles, with side chapels. The bell tower is still mostly the medieval one. The interior is now in Baroque style and houses an altarpiece by Fermo Stella da Caravaggio (1547) and an urn with the relics of St. Vith, patron saint of Omegna.
- Ponte Antico ("Ancient Bridge", 15th century), over the Strona river.
- Porta della Valle ("Valley Gate", c. 1100 AD), also known as Porta Romana. It is the only surviving one among the five medieval gates of Omegna.
- Museum of Arts and Industry Forum.

== Twin towns ==
- (Italy) Lodi, Lombardy
- Pornic, France
