= List of municipalities of the Province of Verbano-Cusio-Ossola =

The following is a list of the 74 municipalities (comuni) of the Province of Verbano-Cusio-Ossola in the region of Piedmont in Italy.

== List ==
Municipality	Population (2026)	Area (km²)	Density
Antrona Schieranco	392	100.18	3.9
Anzola d'Ossola	378	13.66	27.7
Arizzano	1,951	1.60	1,219.4
Arola	238	6.61	36.0
Aurano	111	21.16	5.2
Baceno	862	77.27	11.2
Bannio Anzino	453	39.47	11.5
Baveno	4,504	17.10	263.4
Bee	777	3.50	222.0
Belgirate	450	7.13	63.1
Beura-Cardezza	1,429	28.55	50.1
Bognanco	198	58.00	3.4
Borgomezzavalle	284	19.09	14.9
Brovello-Carpugnino	804	8.22	97.8
Calasca-Castiglione	581	57.07	10.2
Cambiasca	1,630	3.96	411.6
Cannero Riviera	885	14.42	61.4
Cannobio	5,012	52.53	95.4
Caprezzo	175	7.26	24.1
Casale Corte Cerro	3,278	12.52	261.8
Ceppo Morelli	285	40.19	7.1
Cesara	666	11.65	57.2
Cossogno	662	40.26	16.4
Craveggia	789	36.22	21.8
Crevoladossola	4,385	39.87	110.0
Crodo	1,413	53.58	26.4
Domodossola	17,625	36.89	477.8
Druogno	1,029	29.61	34.8
Formazza	410	130.65	3.1
Germagno	185	2.90	63.8
Ghiffa	2,165	14.65	147.8
Gignese	1,119	14.58	76.7
Gravellona Toce	7,642	14.21	537.8
Gurro	159	13.29	12.0
Intragna	85	9.92	8.6
Loreglia	197	9.15	21.5
Macugnaga	485	99.57	4.9
Madonna del Sasso	347	15.41	22.5
Malesco	1,339	43.18	31.0
Masera	1,487	20.35	73.1
Massiola	103	8.06	12.8
Mergozzo	2,131	27.00	78.9
Miazzina	402	21.18	19.0
Montecrestese	1,249	86.15	14.5
Montescheno	356	22.17	16.1
Nonio	820	9.80	83.7
Oggebbio	794	21.44	37.0
Omegna	14,182	30.37	467.0
Ornavasso	3,301	25.92	127.4
Pallanzeno	1,064	4.37	243.5
Piedimulera	1,426	7.57	188.4
Pieve Vergonte	2,412	41.67	57.9
Premeno	732	7.88	92.9
Premia	568	88.90	6.4
Premosello-Chiovenda	1,864	34.16	54.6
Quarna Sopra	240	9.39	25.6
Quarna Sotto	373	16.37	22.8
Re	707	27.15	26.0
San Bernardino Verbano	1,226	26.68	46.0
Santa Maria Maggiore	1,305	53.71	24.3
Stresa	4,548	35.36	128.6
Toceno	765	15.77	48.5
Trarego Viggiona	383	18.90	20.3
Trasquera	173	39.60	4.4
Trontano	1,667	56.74	29.4
Valle Cannobina	416	55.18	7.5
Valstrona	1,111	51.89	21.4
Vanzone con San Carlo	397	15.73	25.2
Varzo	1,896	93.77	20.2
Verbania	29,825	37.49	795.5
Vignone	1,187	3.38	351.2
Villadossola	6,249	18.73	333.6
Villette	270	7.38	36.6
Vogogna	1,669	15.62	106.9

== See also ==
- List of municipalities of Piedmont
- List of municipalities of Italy
