= Monte Spalavera =

Mountain in Italy

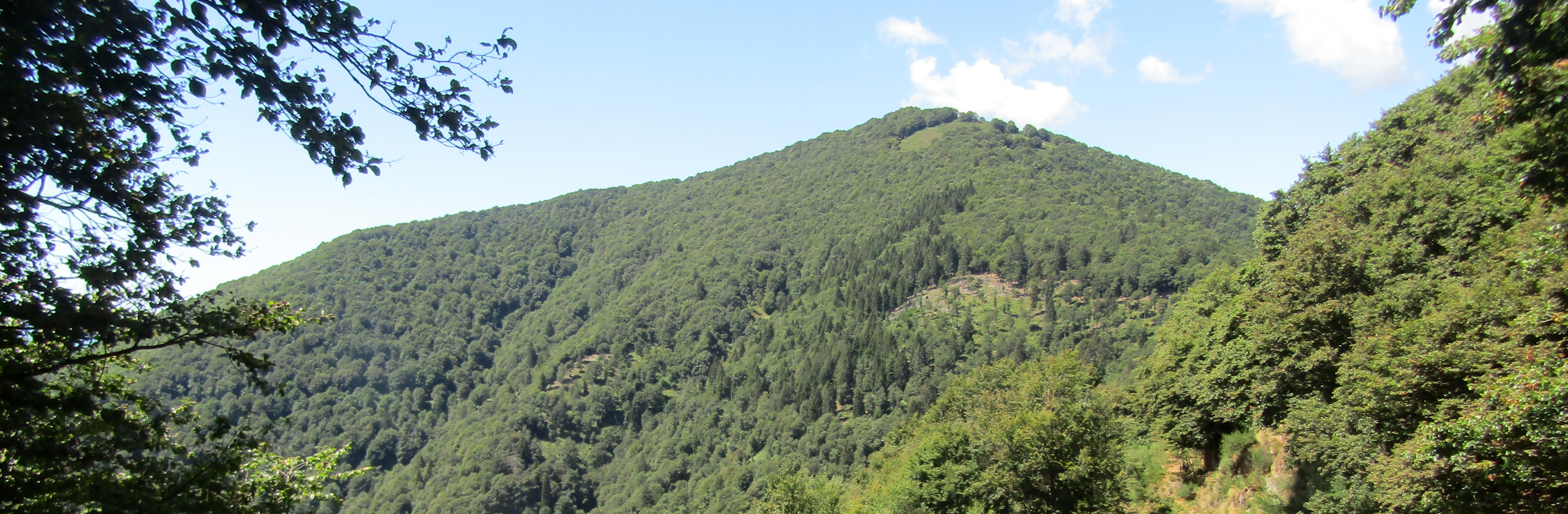

Highest point
- Elevation: 1,534 m (5,033 ft)
- Prominence: 269 m (883 ft)
- Coordinates: 46°01′54″N 8°37′05″E

Geography
- Location: Piedmont, Italy
- Parent range: Lepontine Alps

Monte Spalavera is a mountain of the Lepontine Alps, in north-western Italy, with an elevation of 1,534 meters.

== Details ==
The mountain is located in the province of Verbano-Cusio-Ossola, in northern Piedmont, on the border between the Valle Intrasca and the Val Cannobina. Monte Bavarione lies to its west, Monte Morissolino to its south-east and Cima d’Alpe to its north-east.

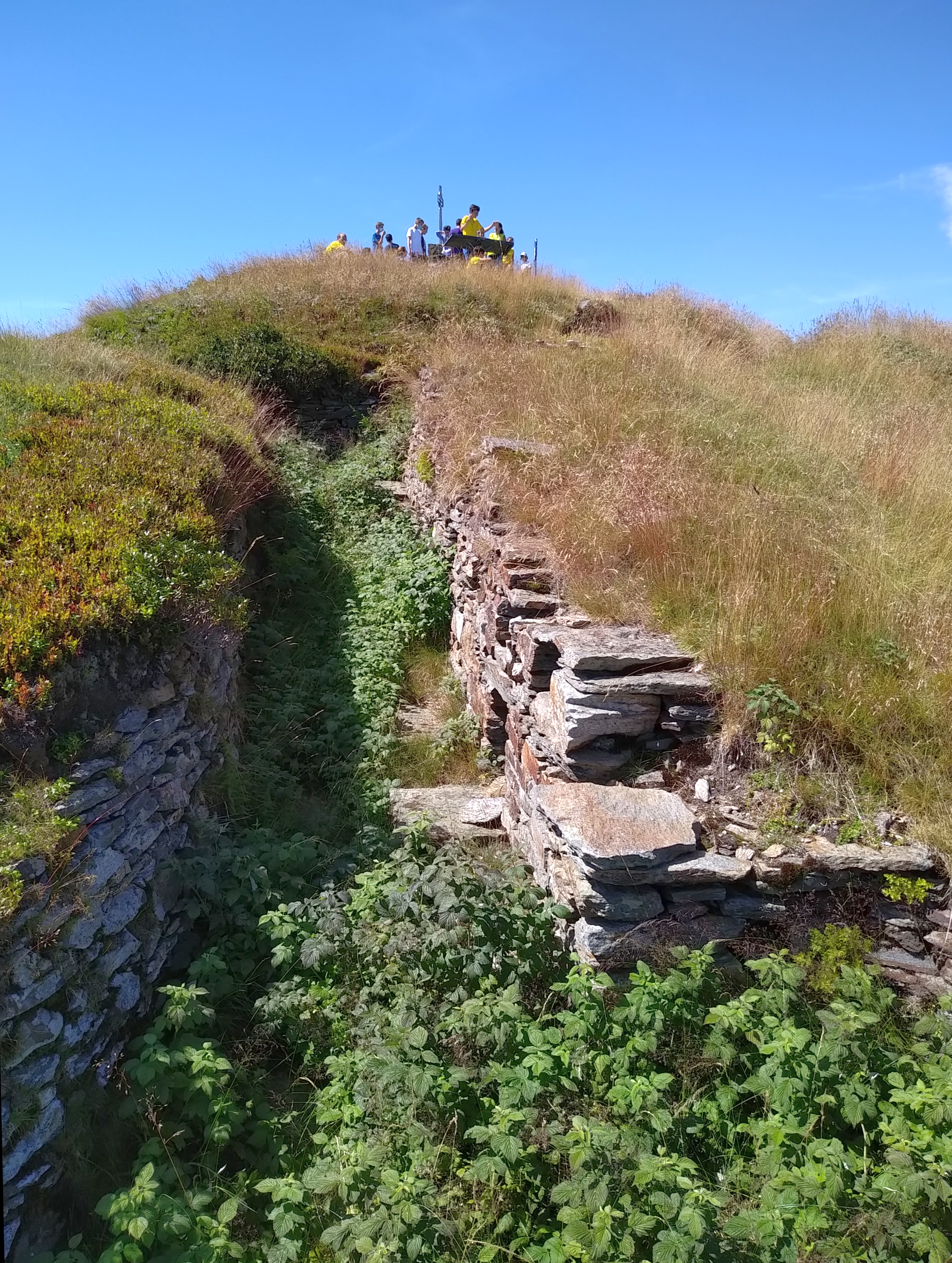
Trenches of the Cadorna Line near the peak

The northern and eastern sides of Spalavera lie in the municipality of Trarego Viggiona, whereas its southwestern side is located in the territory of Aurano. For centuries the communities of Trarego, Aurano, Oggebbio and Cannero Riviera feuded over the ownership of its woods and pasturages.

During the First World War, Spalavera was fortified as part of the Cadorna Line; remains of trenches can still be seen around the peak, which can be reached on foot or mountain bike on the old military road from Alpe Colle, or through a hiking path from Pian d’Alpe.

The northern side of the mountain lies within the Val Grande National Park.
