= Intragna, Piedmont =

Intragna
- Comune
- Comune di Intragna
- Location within Italy Location within Piedmont
- Coordinates: 46°0′N 8°34′E
- Country: Italy
- Region: Piedmont
- Province: Province of Verbano-Cusio-Ossola (VB)

Area
  - Total: 9.9 km^{2} (3.8 sq mi)

Population (Jan. 2017)
  - Total: 106
  - Density: 11/km^{2} (28/sq mi)
- Time zone: UTC+1 (CET)
  - Summer (DST): UTC+2 (CEST)
- Postal code: 28050
- Dialing code: 0323

Intragna is a comune (municipality) in the Province of Verbano-Cusio-Ossola in the Italian region Piedmont, located about 120 kilometres (75 mi) northeast of Turin and about 8 kilometres (5 mi) northeast of Verbania. As of January 1st, 2017, it had a population of 106 and an area of 9.9 square kilometres (3.8 mi^{2}).

Intragna borders the following municipalities: Aurano, Caprezzo, Miazzina, Premeno, Vignone.

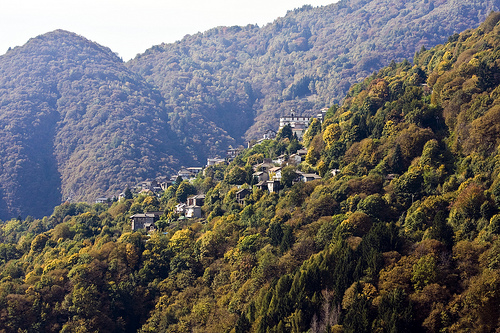
View of the town
