= Bee, Piedmont =

Bee
- Comune
- Comune di Bee
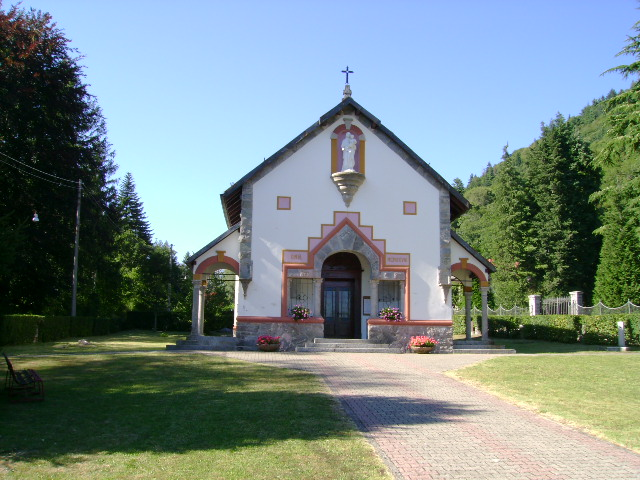
- Madonna della Neve at Pian Nava

- Location within Italy Location within Piedmont
- Coordinates: 45°58′N 8°35′E
- Country: Italy
- Region: Piedmont
- Province: Verbano-Cusio-Ossola (VB)
- Frazioni: Albagnano, Pian Nava

Government
  - Mayor: Marco Vietti

Area
  - Total: 3.3 km^{2} (1.3 sq mi)
- Elevation: 591 m (1,939 ft)

Population (Dec. 2004)
  - Total: 700
  - Density: 210/km^{2} (550/sq mi)
- Demonym: Beesi
- Time zone: UTC+1 (CET)
  - Summer (DST): UTC+2 (CEST)
- Postal code: 28813
- Dialing code: 0323
- Patron saint: Santa Croce
- Saint day: 14 September
- Website: Official website

Bee (in Piemontese Bé) is a commune of 623 inhabitants in the Province of Verbano-Cusio-Ossola in the Italian region Piedmont. It is situated above the western shore of Lago Maggiore and is about 120 kilometres (75 mi) northeast of Turin and about 5 kilometres (3 mi) northeast of Verbania.

The commune extends over an area of about 3.3 square kilometres (1.3 mi^{2}) and includes two small frazione: Pian Nava lies above the principal settlement, while Albagnano is on the opposite side of the valley. There is also the residential village of Montelago.

Bee borders the following municipalities: Arizzano, Ghiffa, Premeno, Vignone.
