= Premeno =

- Comune
- Comune di Premeno
- Location within Italy Location within Piedmont
- Coordinates: 46°1′N 8°41′E
- Country: Italy
- Region: Piedmont
- Province: Province of Verbano-Cusio-Ossola (VB)
- Frazioni: Esio, Pollino

Area
  - Total: 7.4 km^{2} (2.9 sq mi)

Population (Dec. 2004)
  - Total: 776
  - Density: 100/km^{2} (270/sq mi)
- Time zone: UTC+1 (CET)
  - Summer (DST): UTC+2 (CEST)
- Postal code: 28057
- Dialing code: 0323

Premeno is a comune (municipality) in the Province of Verbano-Cusio-Ossola in the Italian region Piedmont, located about 130 kilometres (81 mi) northeast of Turin and about 15 kilometres (9 mi) northeast of Verbania. As of 31 December 2004, it had a population of 776 and an area of 7.4 square kilometres (2.9 mi^{2}).

The municipality of Premeno contains the frazioni (subdivisions, mainly villages and hamlets) Esio and Pollino.

Premeno borders the following municipalities: Aurano, Bee, Ghiffa, Intragna, Oggebbio, Vignone.

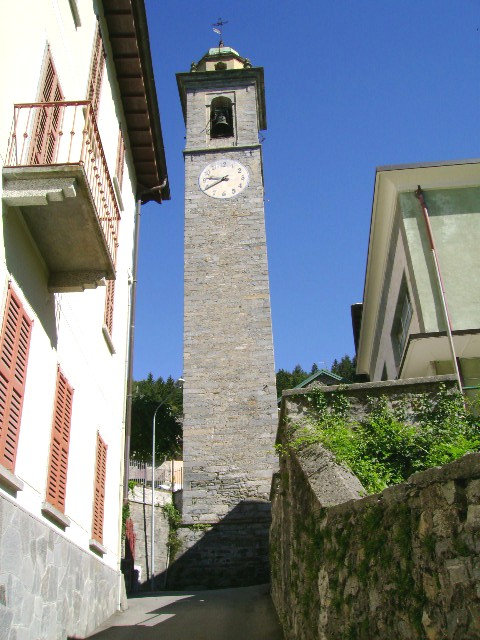
the campanile

== Demographic evolution ==
Historical population

Year	Pop.	±%
1861	512	—
1871	566	+10.5%
1881	650	+14.8%
1901	731	+12.5%
1911	836	+14.4%

Year	Pop.	±%
1921	796	−4.8%
1931	784	−1.5%
1936	791	+0.9%
1951	769	−2.8%
1961	798	+3.8%

Year	Pop.	±%
1971	789	−1.1%
1981	775	−1.8%
1991	741	−4.4%
2001	769	+3.8%

Source: Data from ISTAT
