= Arizzano =

- Comune
- Comune di Arizzano
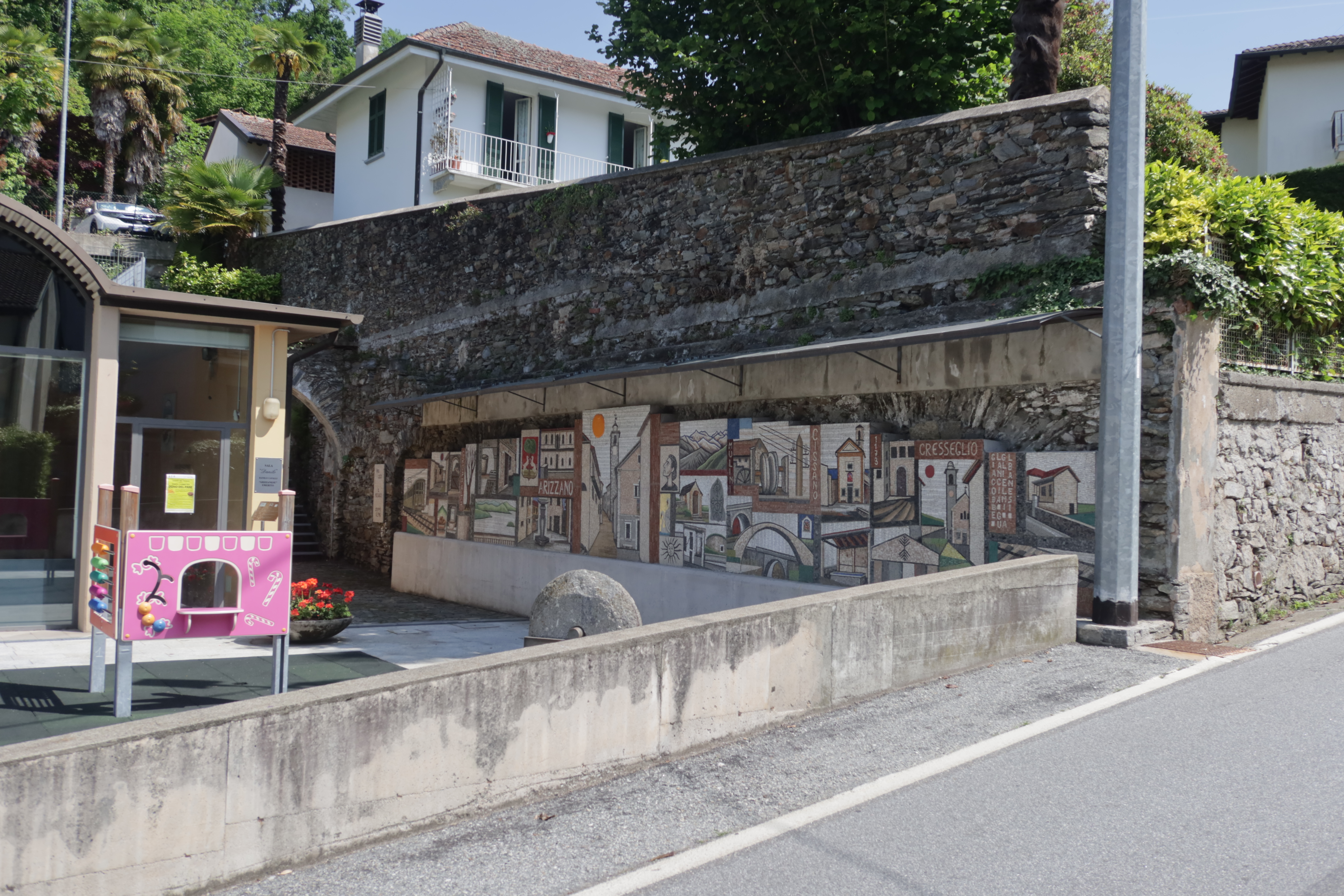

- Coat of arms

- Location of Arizzano in Italy Arizzano (Piedmont)
- Coordinates: 45°58′N 8°35′E
- Country: Italy
- Region: Piedmont
- Province: Province of Verbano-Cusio-Ossola (VB)
- Frazioni: Cissano, Cresseglio

Government
  - Mayor: Enrico Calderoni

Area
  - Total: 1.6 km^{2} (0.62 sq mi)
- Elevation: 458 m (1,503 ft)

Population (Dec. 2004)
  - Total: 2,009
  - Density: 1,300/km^{2} (3,300/sq mi)
- Demonym: Arizzanesi
- Time zone: UTC+1 (CET)
  - Summer (DST): UTC+2 (CEST)
- Postal code: 28811
- Dialing code: 0323
- Website: Official website

Arizzano is a comune (municipality) in the Province of Verbano-Cusio-Ossola in the Italian region Piedmont, located about 120 kilometres (75 mi) northeast of Turin and about 5 kilometres (3 mi) northeast of Verbania.

Arizzano borders the following municipalities: Bee, Ghiffa, Verbania, Vignone.
