= Anzola d'Ossola =

- Comune
- Comune di Anzola d'Ossola
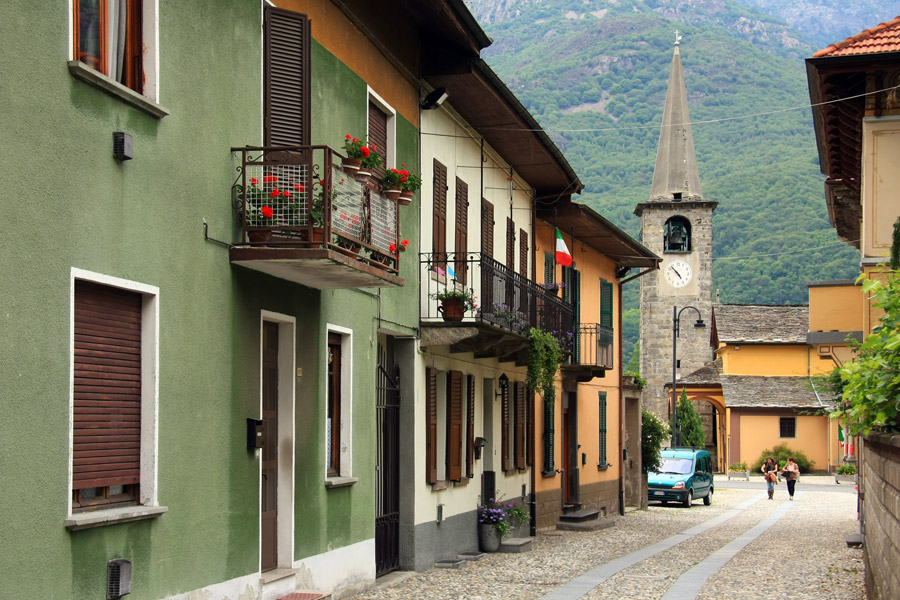

- Coat of arms

- Location within Italy Location within Piedmont
- Coordinates: 45°59′N 8°20′E
- Country: Italy
- Region: Piedmont
- Province: Verbano-Cusio-Ossola (VB)

Government
  - Mayor: Andrea Melloni

Area
  - Total: 13.8 km^{2} (5.3 sq mi)
- Elevation: 210 m (690 ft)

Population (30 September 2009)
  - Total: 455
  - Density: 33.0/km^{2} (85.4/sq mi)
- Demonym: Anzolesi
- Time zone: UTC+1 (CET)
  - Summer (DST): UTC+2 (CEST)
- Postal code: 28020
- Dialing code: 0323
- Patron saint: St. Thomas
- Saint day: 21 December
- Website: Official website

Anzola d'Ossola is a comune (municipality) in the Province of Verbano-Cusio-Ossola in the Italian region Piedmont, located about 110 kilometres (68 mi) northeast of Turin and about 15 kilometres (9 mi) northwest of Verbania. It occupies a small alluvial plain near the Toce river: its name derives perhaps from a meander (Italian: ansa) once formed here by the river. In the Middle Ages it was a possession of the bishops of Novara and the Counts of Biandrate, until in 1322 it was acquired with the whole lower Val d'Ossola by the Visconti of Milan.

Anzola d'Ossola borders the following municipalities: Massiola, Ornavasso, Pieve Vergonte, Premosello-Chiovenda, Valstrona.
