= Vignone =

- Comune
- Comune di Vignone
- Location within Italy Location within Piedmont
- Coordinates: 45°57′N 8°33′E
- Country: Italy
- Region: Piedmont
- Province: Province of Verbano-Cusio-Ossola (VB)

Area
  - Total: 3.5 km^{2} (1.4 sq mi)

Population (Dec. 2004)
  - Total: 1,150
  - Density: 330/km^{2} (850/sq mi)
- Time zone: UTC+1 (CET)
  - Summer (DST): UTC+2 (CEST)
- Postal code: 28050
- Dialing code: 0323

Vignone is a comune (municipality) in the Province of Verbano-Cusio-Ossola in the Italian region Piedmont, located about 120 kilometres (75 mi) northeast of Turin and about 2 kilometres (1.2 mi) northeast of Verbania. As of 31 December 2004, it had a population of 1,150 and an area of 3.5 square kilometres (1.4 mi^{2}).

Vignone borders the following municipalities: Arizzano, Bee, Cambiasca, Caprezzo, Intragna, Premeno, Verbania.

== Demographic evolution ==
Historical population

Year	Pop.	±%
1861	515	—
1871	551	+7.0%
1881	579	+5.1%
1901	568	−1.9%
1911	631	+11.1%

Year	Pop.	±%
1921	570	−9.7%
1931	608	+6.7%
1936	525	−13.7%
1951	586	+11.6%
1961	568	−3.1%

Year	Pop.	±%
1971	585	+3.0%
1981	875	+49.6%
1991	922	+5.4%
2001	1,090	+18.2%

Source: Data from ISTAT
