= Cambiasca =

- Comune
- Comune di Cambiasca
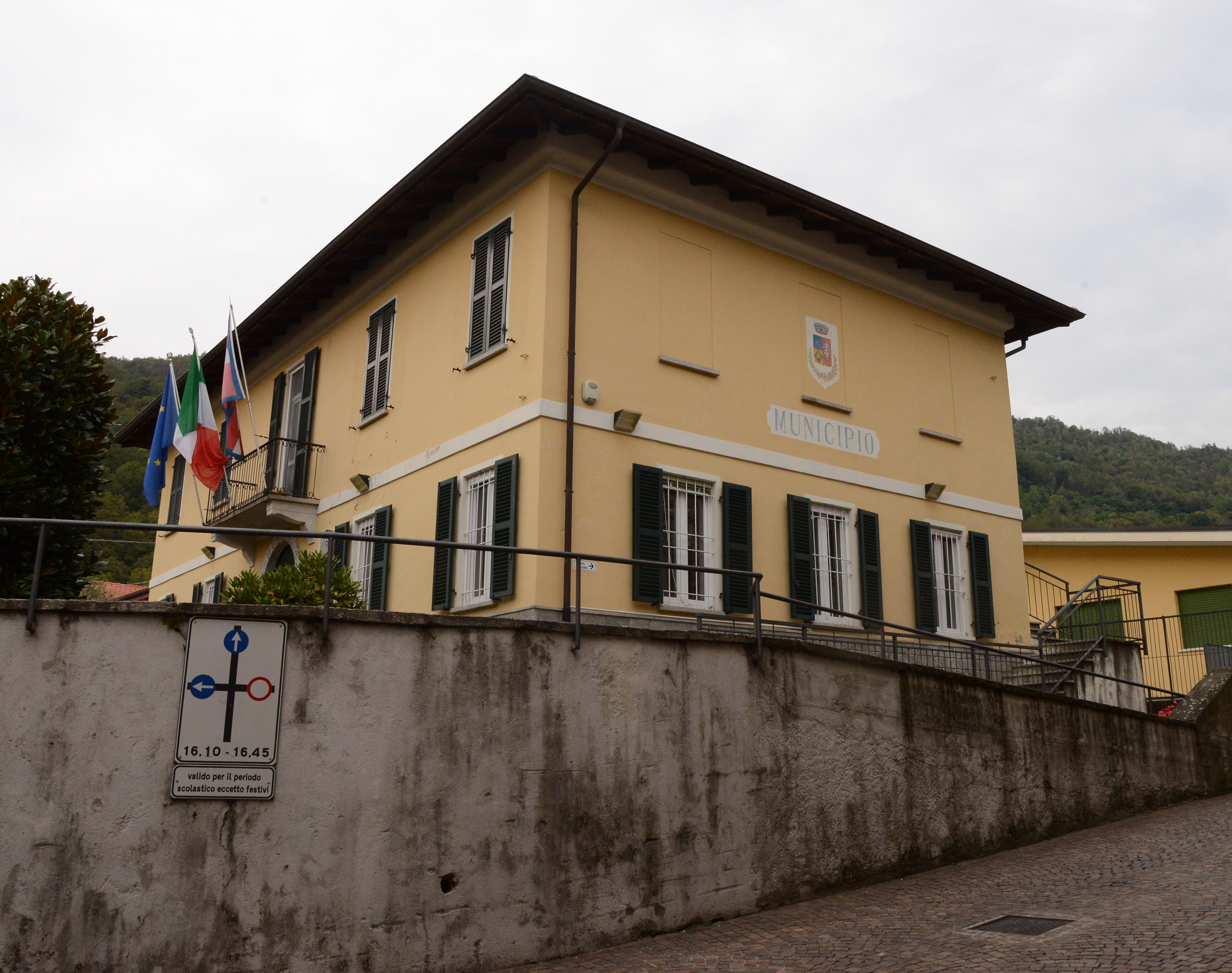

- Location within Italy Location within Piedmont
- Coordinates: 45°57′45″N 8°32′36″E
- Country: Italy
- Region: Piedmont
- Province: Province of Verbano-Cusio-Ossola (VB)
- Frazioni: Ramello, Comero

Area
  - Total: 3.9 km^{2} (1.5 sq mi)
- Elevation: 290 m (950 ft)

Population (Dec. 2004)
  - Total: 1,529
  - Density: 390/km^{2} (1,000/sq mi)
- Demonym: Cambiaschesi
- Time zone: UTC+1 (CET)
  - Summer (DST): UTC+2 (CEST)
- Postal code: 28814
- Dialing code: 0323

Cambiasca is a comune (municipality) in the Province of Verbano-Cusio-Ossola in the Italian region Piedmont, located about 120 kilometres (75 mi) northeast of Turin and about 6 kilometres (4 mi) northeast of Verbania. As of 31 December 2004, it had a population of 1,529 and an area of 3.9 square kilometres (1.5 mi^{2}).

The municipality of Cambiasca contains the frazioni (subdivisions, mainly villages and hamlets) Ramello and Comero.

Cambiasca borders the following municipalities: Caprezzo, Miazzina, Verbania, Vignone.

== Demographic evolution ==
Historical population

Year	Pop.	±%
1861	736	—
1871	726	−1.4%
1881	840	+15.7%
1901	825	−1.8%
1911	849	+2.9%

Year	Pop.	±%
1921	796	−6.2%
1931	946	+18.8%
1936	837	−11.5%
1951	1,041	+24.4%
1961	1,242	+19.3%

Year	Pop.	±%
1971	1,379	+11.0%
1981	1,464	+6.2%
1991	1,523	+4.0%
2001	1,538	+1.0%

Source: Data from ISTAT
