= Massiola =

- Comune
- Comune di Massiola
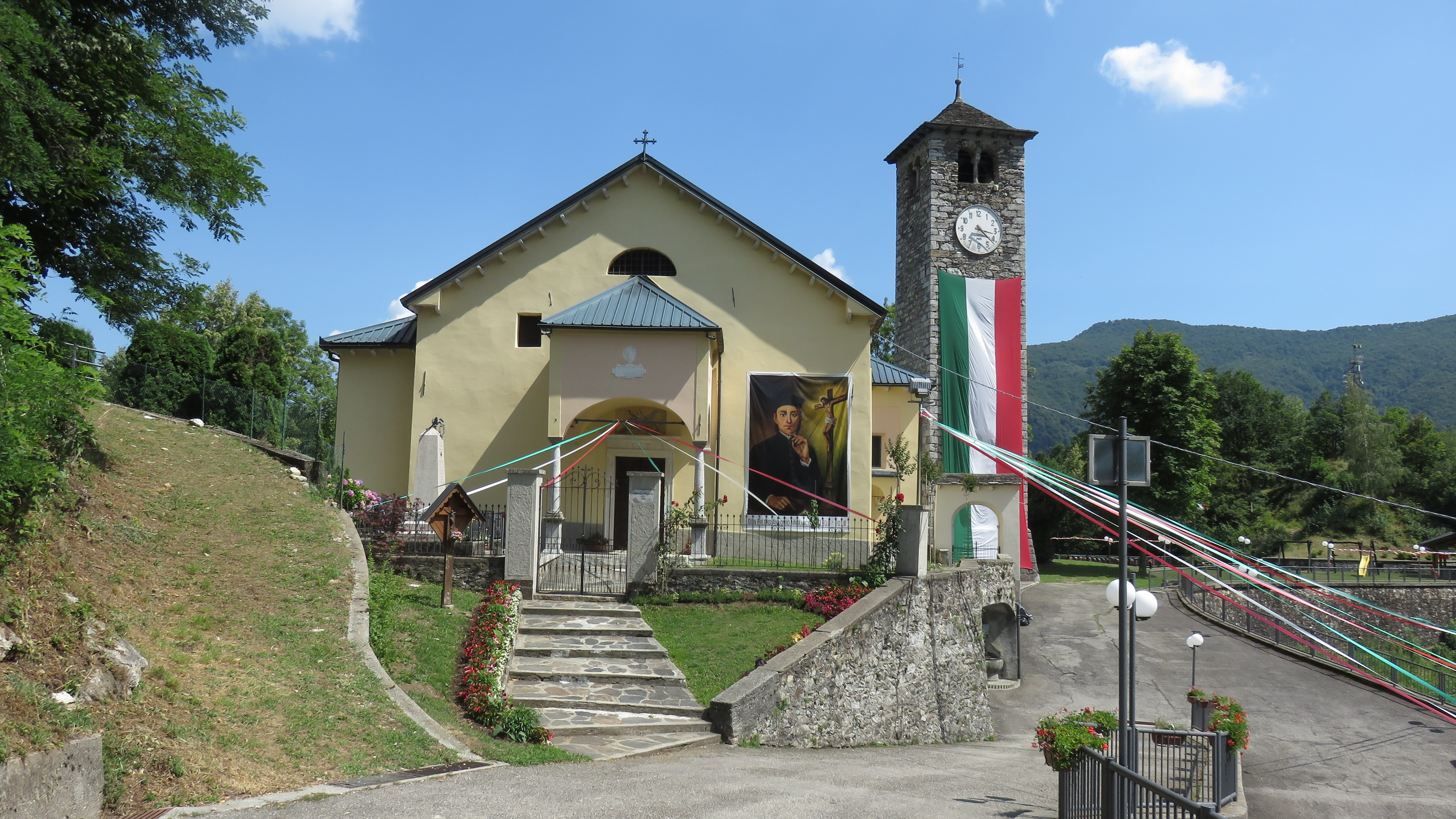

- Location within Italy Location within Piedmont
- Coordinates: 45°59′N 8°20′E
- Country: Italy
- Region: Piedmont
- Province: Province of Verbano-Cusio-Ossola (VB)

Area
  - Total: 8.0 km^{2} (3.1 sq mi)

Population (Dec. 2004)
  - Total: 169
  - Density: 21/km^{2} (55/sq mi)
- Time zone: UTC+1 (CET)
  - Summer (DST): UTC+2 (CEST)
- Postal code: 28020
- Dialing code: 0323

Massiola is a comune (municipality) in the Province of Verbano-Cusio-Ossola in the Italian region Piedmont, located about 110 kilometres (68 mi) northeast of Turin and about 15 kilometres (9 mi) northwest of Verbania. As of 31 December 2004, it had a population of 169 and an area of 8.0 square kilometres (3.1 mi^{2}).

Massiola borders the following municipalities: Anzola d'Ossola, Valstrona.

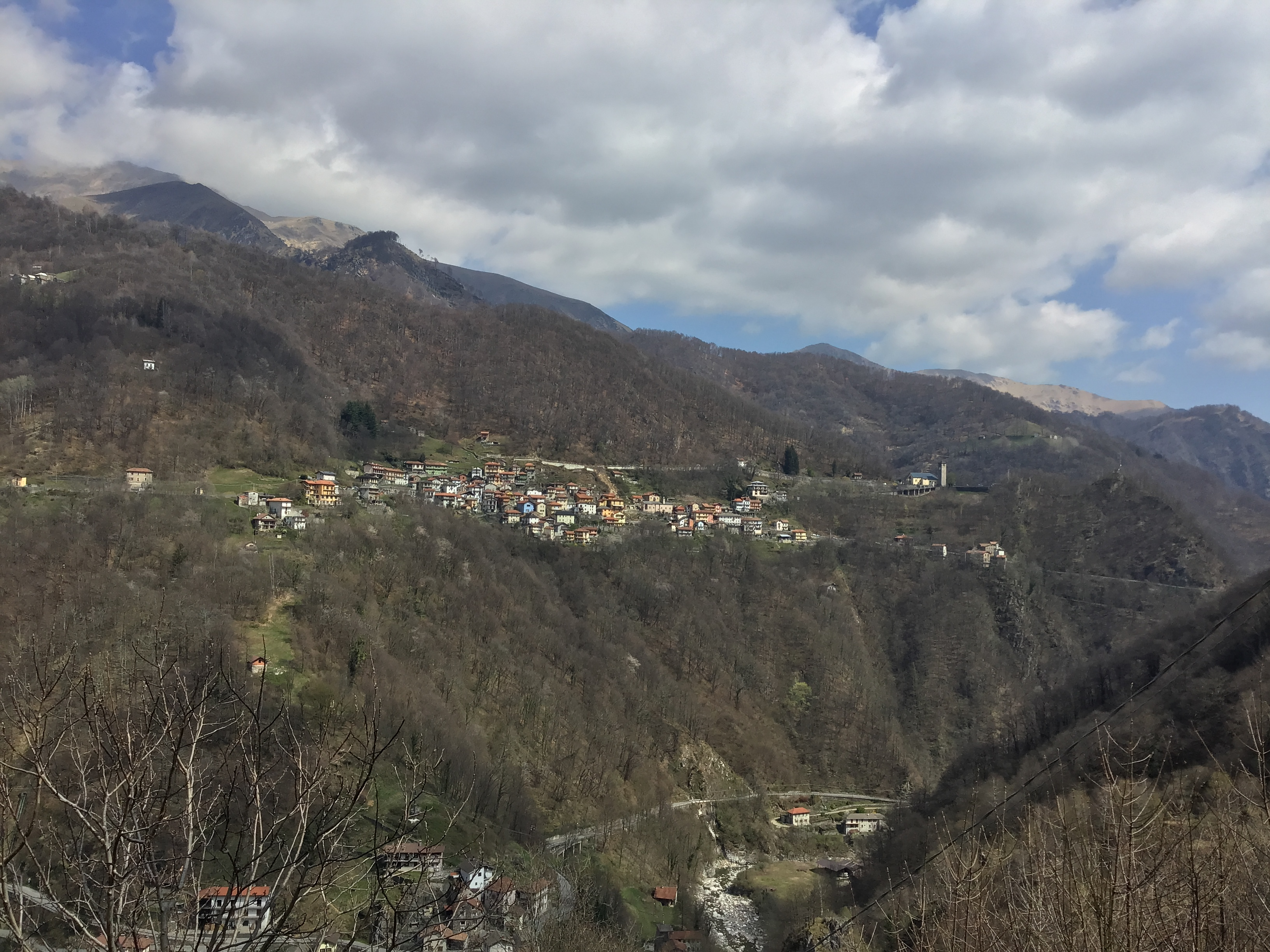
Massiola

== Demographic evolution ==
Historical population

Year	Pop.	±%
1861	309	—
1871	324	+4.9%
1881	364	+12.3%
1901	348	−4.4%
1911	327	−6.0%

Year	Pop.	±%
1921	360	+10.1%
1931	372	+3.3%
1936	377	+1.3%
1951	348	−7.7%
1961	331	−4.9%

Year	Pop.	±%
1971	288	−13.0%
1981	243	−15.6%
1991	192	−21.0%
2001	173	−9.9%

Source: Data from ISTAT
