= Lake Castel =

Artificial lake in Formazza, Province of Verbano-Cusio-Ossola, Italy

Lago Castel
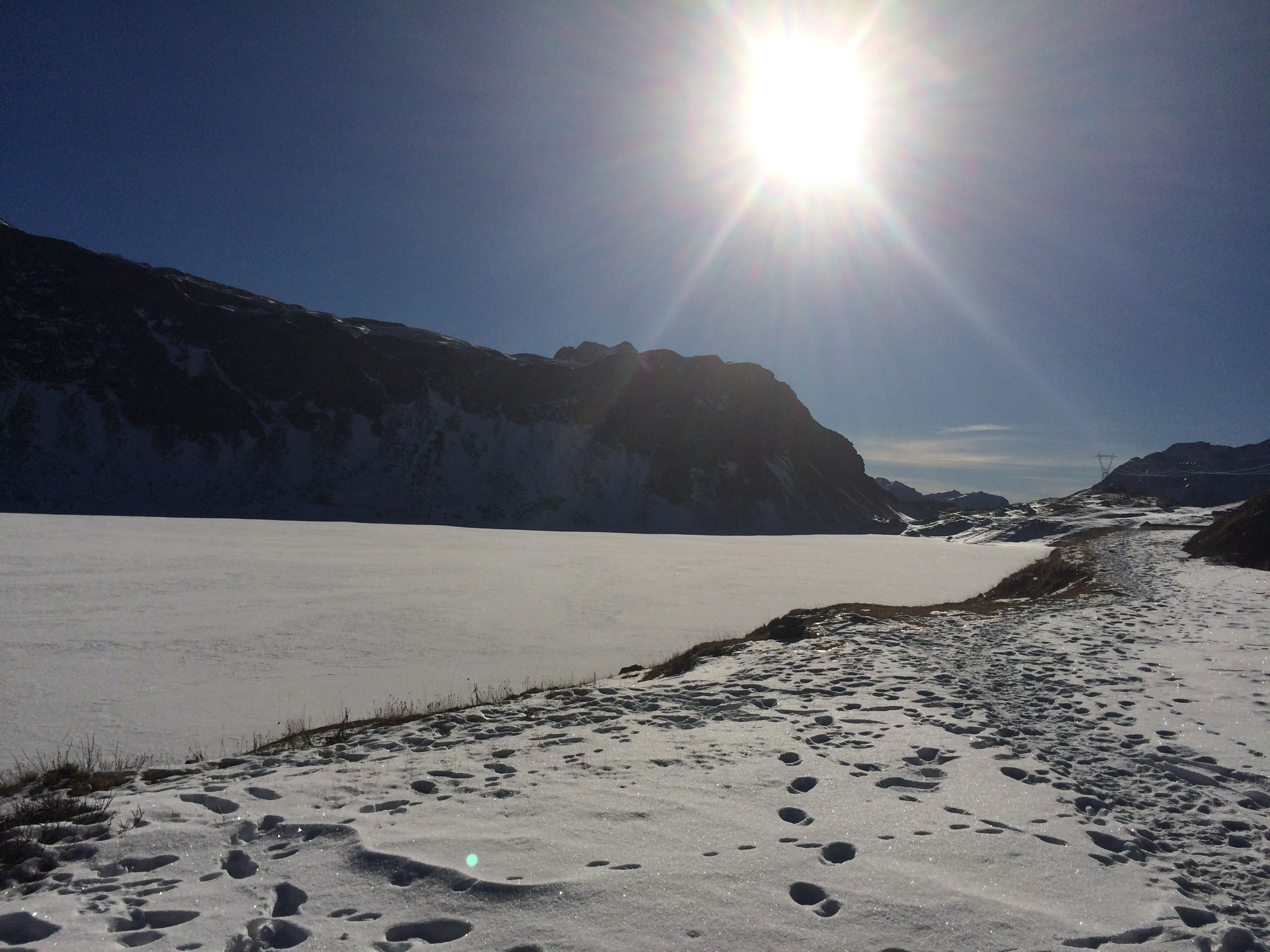
- The lake in winter
- Interactive map of Lago Castel
- Location: Formazza, Province of Verbano-Cusio-Ossola, Piedmont, Italy
- Coordinates: 46°25′30″N 8°26′07″E
- Type: Artificial lake
- Basin countries: Italy
- Surface area: 0.37 km^{2} (0.14 sq mi)
- Surface elevation: 2,224 m (7,297 ft)

The Lago Castel or Lago Kastel (in Walser: Chaschtulsee) is a lake in the municipality of Formazza, in the Province of Verbano-Cusio-Ossola.

== History ==
The lake in 1931, on the right

The lake was expanded with the construction, between 1924 and 1928, of a 17-meter-high dry stone dam, so that its waters could be used for hydroelectric purposes at the Sottofrua hydroelectric power plant.

== Characteristics ==
The lake is located at an elevation of 2224 m, in upper Val Formazza, and is dominated by various peaks, including the Corno Gries, the Punta del Castel, and the Basòdino. Near the lake stands the Rifugio Maria Luisa, and a botanical garden has been established. Created by the Alpe Veglia and Alpe Devero Natural Park, it is dedicated to the area's floristic peculiarities and can be visited via a thematic path called the sentiero fiorito.

== See also ==
- Val Formazza
