= Oggebbio =

- Comune
- Comune di Oggebbio
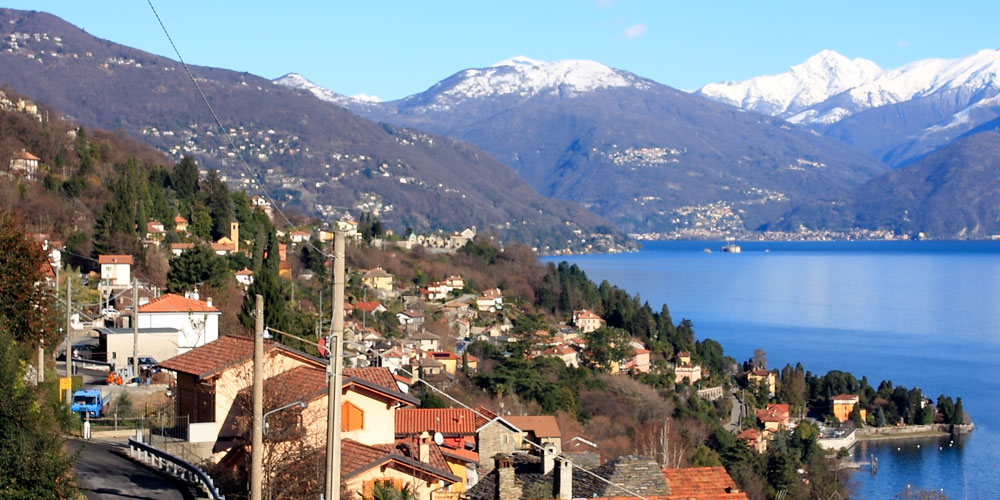
- the town with the lake

- Coat of arms

- Location within Italy Location within Piedmont
- Coordinates: 45°59′N 8°39′E
- Country: Italy
- Region: Piedmont
- Province: Verbano-Cusio-Ossola (VB)

Government
  - Mayor: Gisella Polli

Area
  - Total: 20.2 km^{2} (7.8 sq mi)

Population (30 September 2008)
  - Total: 903
  - Density: 44.7/km^{2} (116/sq mi)
- Demonym: Oggebbiesi
- Time zone: UTC+1 (CET)
  - Summer (DST): UTC+2 (CEST)
- Postal code: 28824
- Dialing code: 0323

Oggebbio is a comune (municipality) in the Province of Verbano-Cusio-Ossola in the Italian region Piedmont, located about 130 kilometres (81 mi) northeast of Turin and about 11 kilometres (7 mi) northeast of Verbania.

Oggebbio borders the following municipalities: Aurano, Brezzo di Bedero, Cannero Riviera, Castelveccana, Ghiffa, Porto Valtravaglia, Premeno, Trarego Viggiona.
