= Miazzina =

- Comune
- Comune di Miazzina
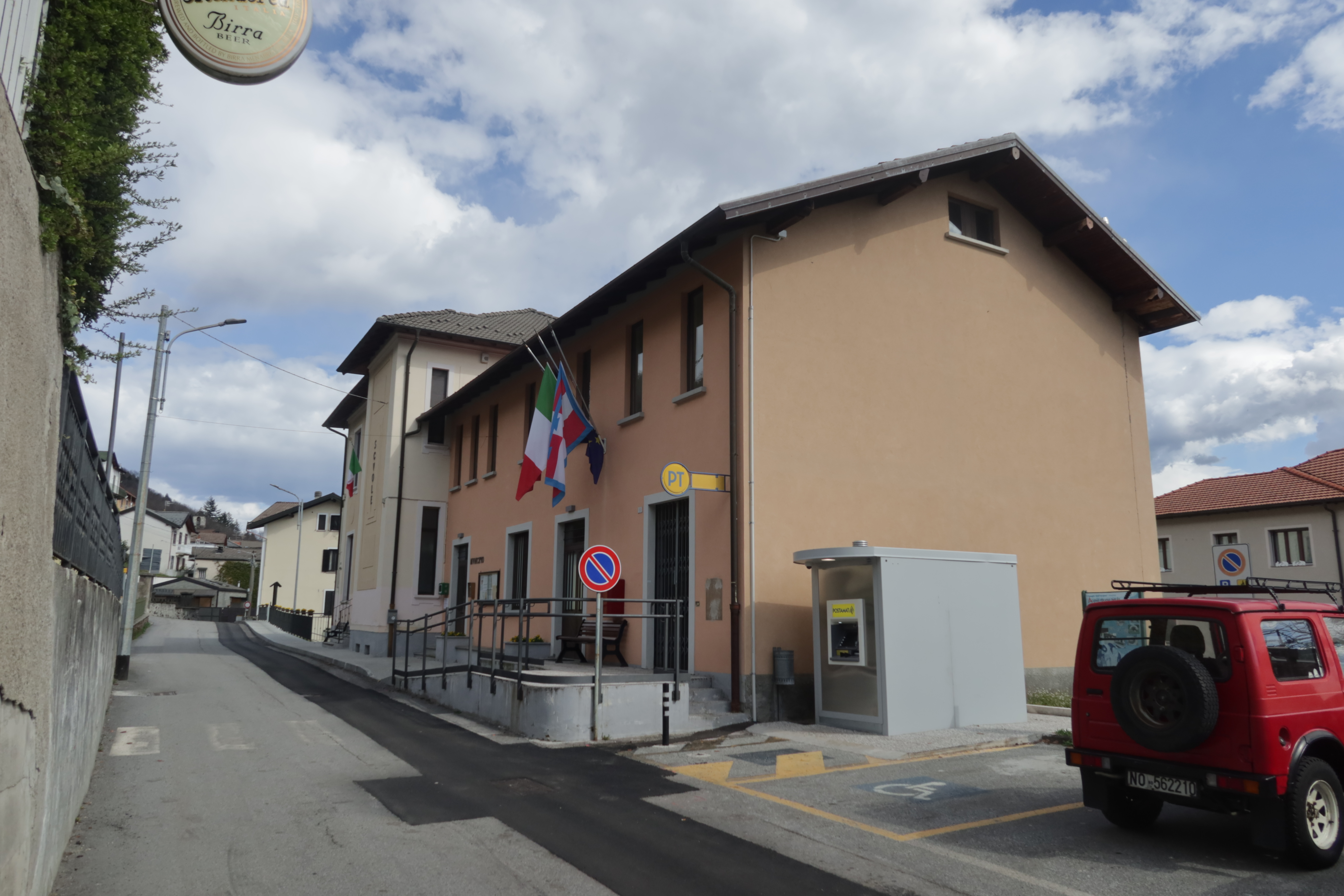

- Location within Italy Location within Piedmont
- Coordinates: 46°1′N 8°41′E
- Country: Italy
- Region: Piedmont
- Province: Province of Verbano-Cusio-Ossola (VB)

Area
  - Total: 21.5 km^{2} (8.3 sq mi)

Population (Dec. 2004)
  - Total: 415
  - Density: 19.3/km^{2} (50.0/sq mi)
- Time zone: UTC+1 (CET)
  - Summer (DST): UTC+2 (CEST)
- Postal code: 28056
- Dialing code: 0323

Miazzina is a comune (municipality) in the province of Verbano-Cusio-Ossola, in the Italian region of Piedmont, located about 130 kilometres (81 mi) northeast of Turin and about 15 kilometres (9 mi) northeast of Verbania. As of 31 December 2004, it had a population of 415 and an area of 21.5 square kilometres (8.3 mi^{2}).

Miazzina borders the following municipalities: Aurano, Cambiasca, Caprezzo, Cossogno, Gurro, Intragna, Valle Cannobina, Verbania.

== Demographic evolution ==
Historical population

Year	Pop.	±%
1861	497	—
1871	517	+4.0%
1881	495	−4.3%
1901	408	−17.6%
1911	371	−9.1%

Year	Pop.	±%
1921	421	+13.5%
1931	447	+6.2%
1936	417	−6.7%
1951	404	−3.1%
1961	406	+0.5%

Year	Pop.	±%
1971	399	−1.7%
1981	400	+0.3%
1991	370	−7.5%
2001	391	+5.7%

Source: Data from ISTAT
