= Caprezzo =

- Comune
- Comune di Caprezzo
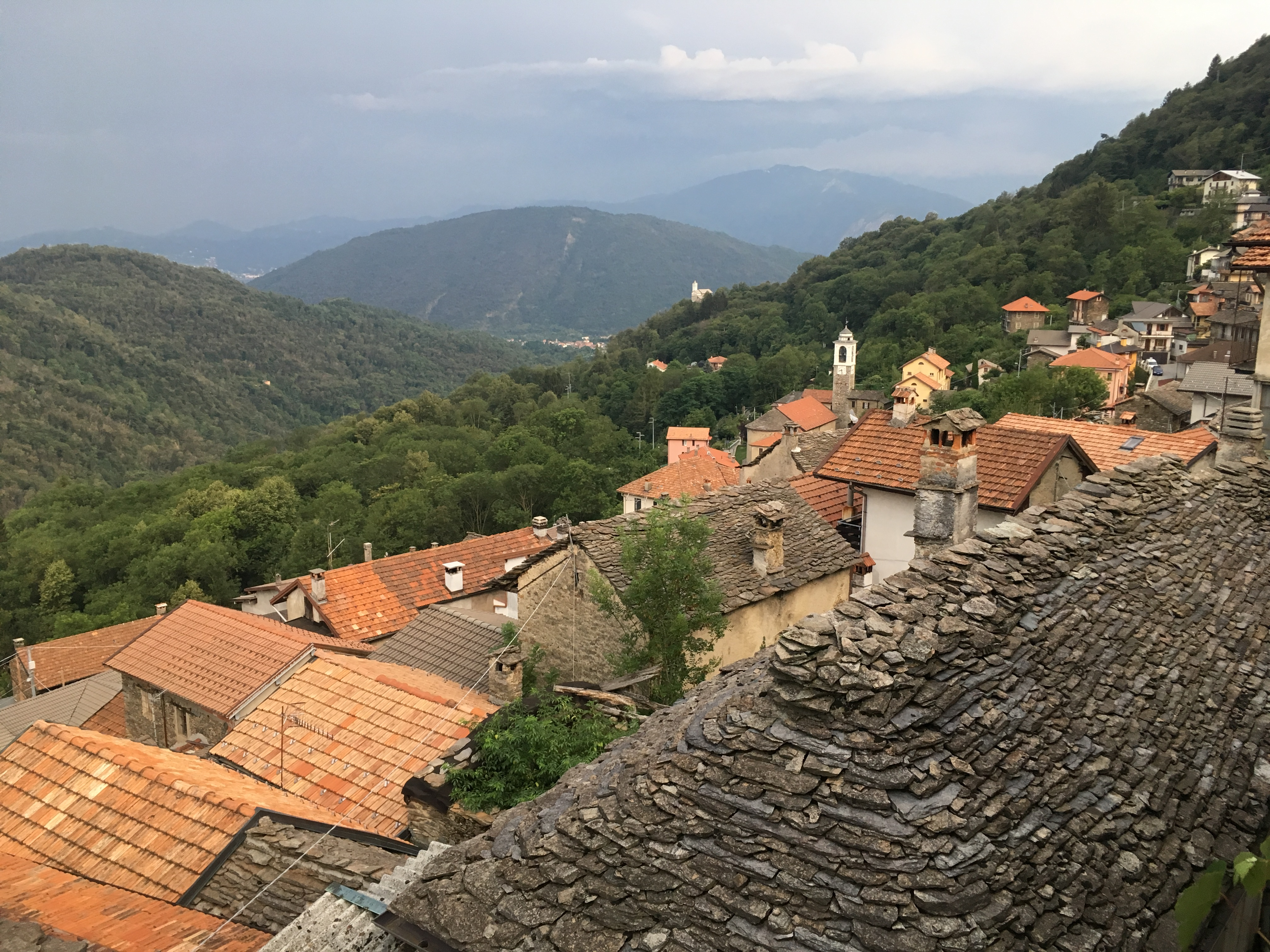

- Location within Italy Location within Piedmont
- Coordinates: 45°59′N 8°34′E
- Country: Italy
- Region: Piedmont
- Province: Province of Verbano-Cusio-Ossola (VB)
- Frazioni: Ponte Nivia

Area
  - Total: 7.3 km^{2} (2.8 sq mi)
- Elevation: 530 m (1,740 ft)

Population (Dec. 2004)
  - Total: 170
  - Density: 23/km^{2} (60/sq mi)
- Demonym: Caprezzesi
- Time zone: UTC+1 (CET)
  - Summer (DST): UTC+2 (CEST)
- Postal code: 28815
- Dialing code: 0323

Caprezzo is a comune (municipality) in the Province of Verbano-Cusio-Ossola in the Italian region Piedmont, located about 120 kilometres (75 mi) northeast of Turin and about 6 kilometres (4 mi) northeast of Verbania. As of 31 December 2004, it had a population of 170 and an area of 7.3 square kilometres (2.8 mi^{2}).

The municipality of Caprezzo contains the frazione (subdivision) Ponte Nivia.

Caprezzo borders the following municipalities: Cambiasca, Intragna, Miazzina, Vignone.

It is the birthplace of Baldassare Verazzi.

== Demographic evolution ==
Historical population

Year	Pop.	±%
1861	442	—
1871	414	−6.3%
1881	505	+22.0%
1901	422	−16.4%
1911	403	−4.5%

Year	Pop.	±%
1921	373	−7.4%
1931	377	+1.1%
1936	257	−31.8%
1951	270	+5.1%
1961	225	−16.7%

Year	Pop.	±%
1971	210	−6.7%
1981	187	−11.0%
1991	165	−11.8%
2001	177	+7.3%

Source: Data from ISTAT
