= Trarego Viggiona =

- Comune
- Comune di Trarego Viggiona
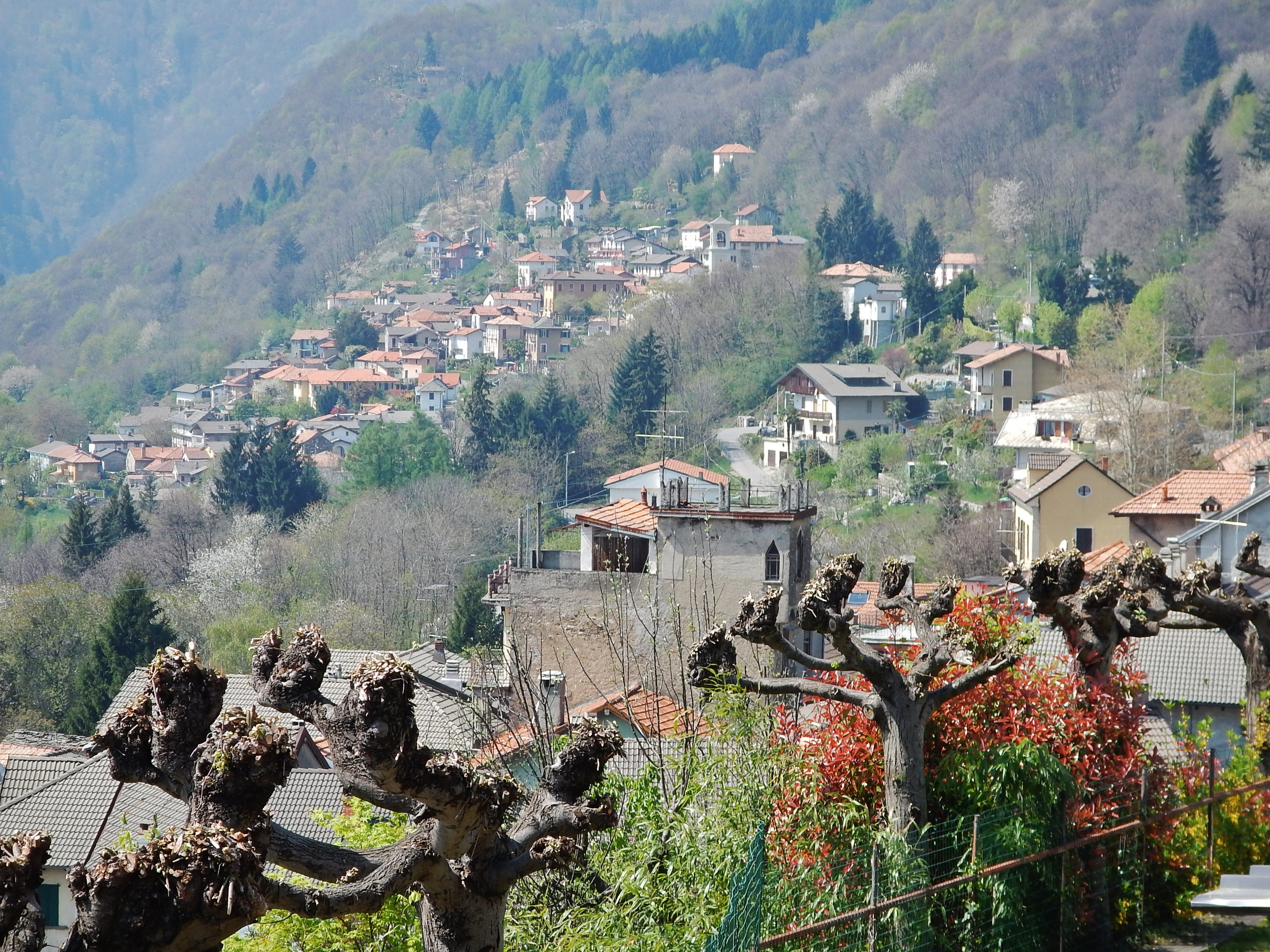

- Location within Italy Location within Piedmont
- Coordinates: 46°4′N 8°35′E
- Country: Italy
- Region: Piedmont
- Province: Province of Verbano-Cusio-Ossola (VB)
- Frazioni: Viggiona, Cheglio

Area
  - Total: 18.8 km^{2} (7.3 sq mi)
- Elevation: 771 m (2,530 ft)

Population (Dec. 2004)
  - Total: 375
  - Density: 19.9/km^{2} (51.7/sq mi)
- Time zone: UTC+1 (CET)
  - Summer (DST): UTC+2 (CEST)
- Postal code: 28050
- Dialing code: 0323

Trarego Viggiona is a comune (municipality) in the Province of Verbano-Cusio-Ossola in the Italian region Piedmont, located about 130 kilometres (81 mi) northeast of Turin and about 15 kilometres (9 mi) north of Verbania. As of 31 December 2004, it had a population of 375 and an area of 18.8 square kilometres (7.3 mi^{2}).

The municipality of Trarego Viggiona contains the frazioni (subdivisions, mainly villages and hamlets) Viggiona and Cheglio.

Trarego Viggiona borders the following municipalities: Aurano, Cannero Riviera, Cannobio, Oggebbio, Valle Cannobina.

== Demographic evolution ==
Historical population

Year	Pop.	±%
1861	994	—
1871	961	−3.3%
1881	891	−7.3%
1901	932	+4.6%
1911	913	−2.0%

Year	Pop.	±%
1921	809	−11.4%
1931	724	−10.5%
1936	638	−11.9%
1951	658	+3.1%
1961	577	−12.3%

Year	Pop.	±%
1971	481	−16.6%
1981	524	+8.9%
1991	456	−13.0%
2001	379	−16.9%

Source: Data from ISTAT
