= Aurano =

- Comune
- Comune di Aurano
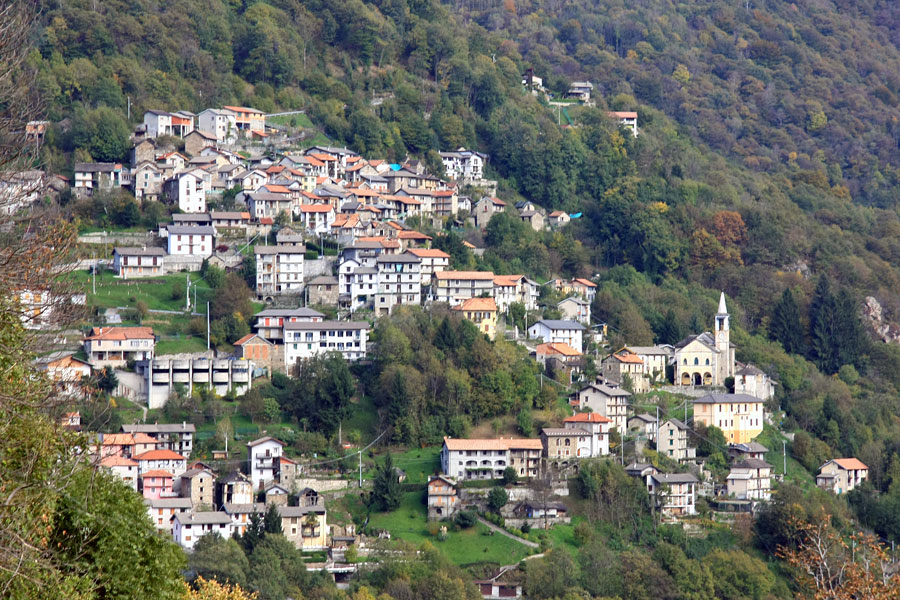
- The town

- Location of Aurano in Italy Aurano (Piedmont)
- Coordinates: 46°1′N 8°41′E
- Country: Italy
- Region: Piedmont
- Province: Verbano-Cusio-Ossola (VB)

Government
  - Mayor: Davide Molinari

Area
  - Total: 21.16 km^{2} (8.17 sq mi)
- Elevation: 683 m (2,241 ft)

Population (30 April 2017)
  - Total: 110
  - Density: 5.2/km^{2} (13/sq mi)
- Demonym: Auranesi
- Time zone: UTC+1 (CET)
  - Summer (DST): UTC+2 (CEST)
- Postal code: 28050
- Dialing code: 0323
- Website: Official website

Aurano is a comune (municipality) in the Province of Verbano-Cusio-Ossola in the Italian region Piedmont, located about 130 kilometres (81 mi) northeast of Turin and about 15 kilometres (9 mi) northeast of Verbania.

Aurano borders the following municipalities: Cannero Riviera, Intragna, Miazzina, Oggebbio, Premeno, Trarego Viggiona, Valle Cannobina. Its territory is included in the National Park of Val Grande.
