= Province of Verbano-Cusio-Ossola =

Coordinates: 45°56′N 8°32′E

Province of Verbano-Cusio-Ossola Provincia del Verbano-Cusio-Ossola (Italian) Provincia dël Verban-Cusi-Òssola (Piedmontese)
- Province
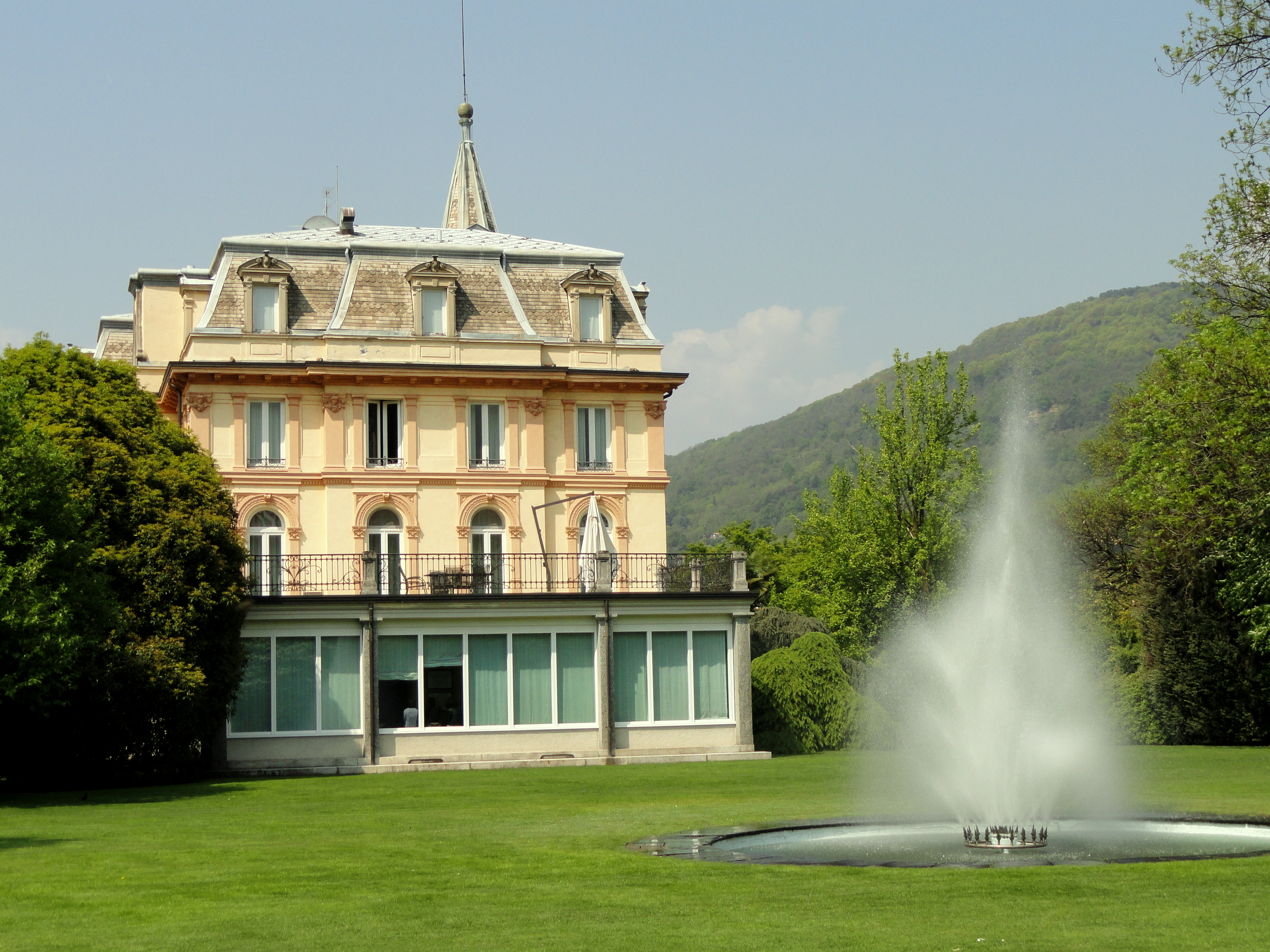
- Villa Taranto in Verbania, seat of the prefecture

- Flag Coat of arms

- Location of the province of Verbano-Cusio-Ossola in Italy
- Interactive map of Province of Verbano-Cusio-Ossola
- Country: Italy
- Region: Piedmont
- Capital(s): Verbania
- Municipalities: 74

Government
  - President: Giandomenico Albertella

Area
  - Total: 2,260.91 km^{2} (872.94 sq mi)

Population (2026)
  - Total: 152,677
  - Density: 67.5290/km^{2} (174.899/sq mi)

GDP
  - Total: €3.733 billion (2015)
  - Per capita: €29.019 (2023)
- Time zone: UTC+1 (CET)
  - Summer (DST): UTC+2 (CEST)
- Postal code: Verbania: 28921-28925, Other areas: 28811-28897
- Telephone prefix: 0163, 0322, 0323, 0324
- ISO 3166 code: VB
- Vehicle registration: VB
- ISTAT code: 103

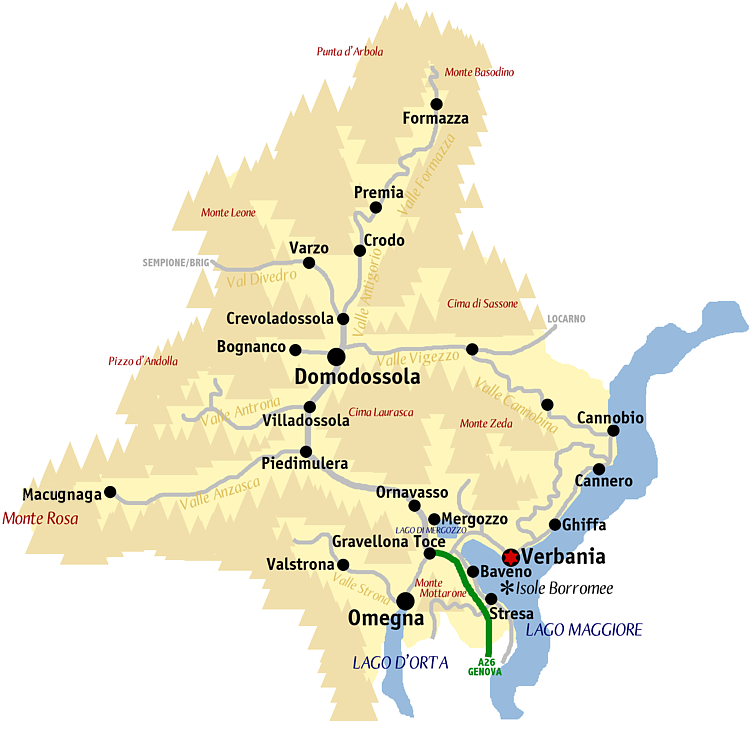
Cities, towns, and roads of the province

The province of Verbano-Cusio-Ossola (Italian: provincia del Verbano-Cusio-Ossola, Italian: [verˈbaːno ˈkuːzjo ˈɔssola], Piedmontese: Provincia dël Verban-Cusi-Òssola) is a province in the region of Piedmont in northern Italy. It was created in 1992 through the fusion of three geographical areas which had previously been part of the province of Novara. The area flanking the western shore of Verbano (or Lago Maggiore) forms the eastern part of the province; Cusio (or Lago d’Orta) and its environs form the southern part; while the north and west of the province consist of the Ossola, a region of Alpine mountains and valleys. The ISO code for the province is VB.

The province has a population of 152,677 in an area of 2,260.91 square kilometres (872.94 mi^{2}) across its 74 municipalities, with the biggest population centres being its capital Verbania, on the shores of Lago Maggiore, Domodossola, the main town of the Ossola, and Omegna, at the northern end of Lago d’Orta.

== Municipalities ==
The province has 74 municipalities:

- Antrona Schieranco
- Anzola d'Ossola
- Arizzano
- Arola
- Aurano
- Baceno
- Bannio Anzino
- Baveno
- Bee
- Belgirate
- Beura-Cardezza
- Bognanco
- Borgomezzavalle
- Brovello-Carpugnino
- Calasca-Castiglione
- Cambiasca
- Cannero Riviera
- Cannobio
- Caprezzo
- Casale Corte Cerro
- Ceppo Morelli
- Cesara
- Cossogno
- Craveggia
- Crevoladossola
- Crodo
- Domodossola
- Druogno
- Formazza
- Germagno
- Ghiffa
- Gignese
- Gravellona Toce
- Gurro
- Intragna
- Loreglia
- Macugnaga
- Madonna del Sasso
- Malesco
- Masera
- Massiola
- Mergozzo
- Miazzina
- Montecrestese
- Montescheno
- Nonio
- Oggebbio
- Omegna
- Ornavasso
- Pallanzeno
- Piedimulera
- Pieve Vergonte
- Premeno
- Premia
- Premosello-Chiovenda
- Quarna Sopra
- Quarna Sotto
- Re
- San Bernardino Verbano
- Santa Maria Maggiore
- Stresa
- Toceno
- Trarego Viggiona
- Trasquera
- Trontano
- Valle Cannobina
- Valstrona
- Vanzone con San Carlo
- Varzo
- Verbania
- Vignone
- Villadossola
- Villette
- Vogogna

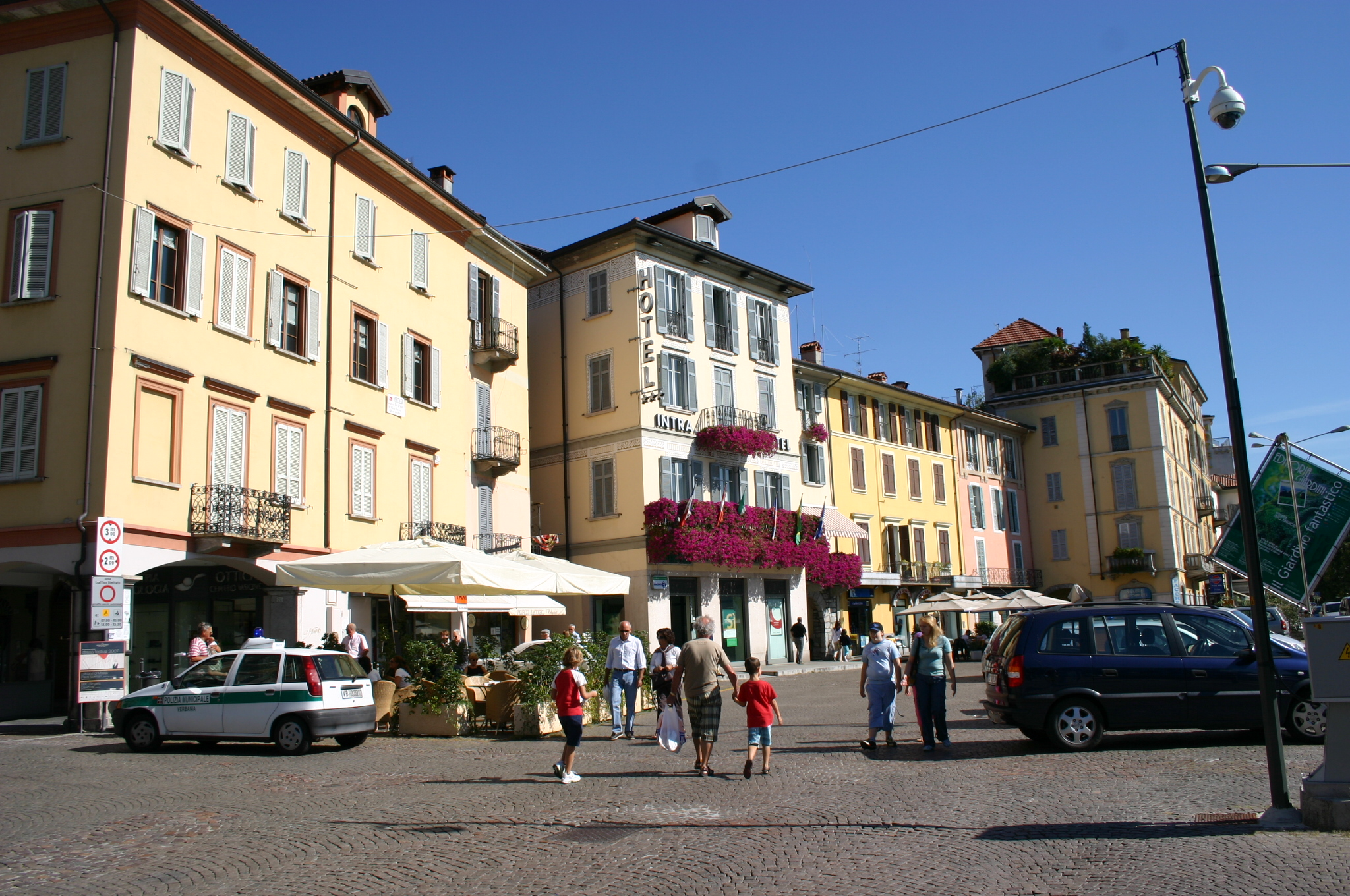
Verbania

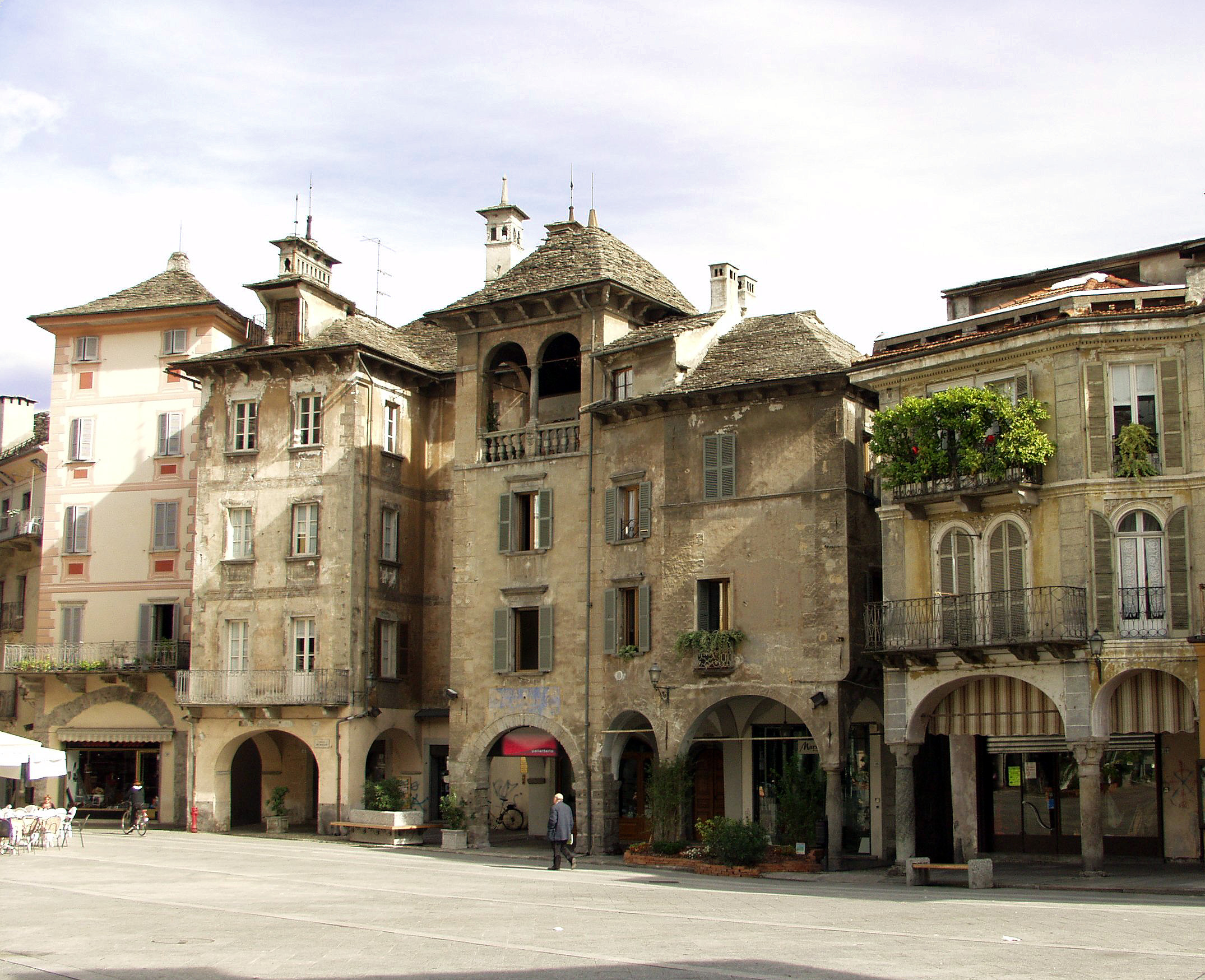
Domodossola

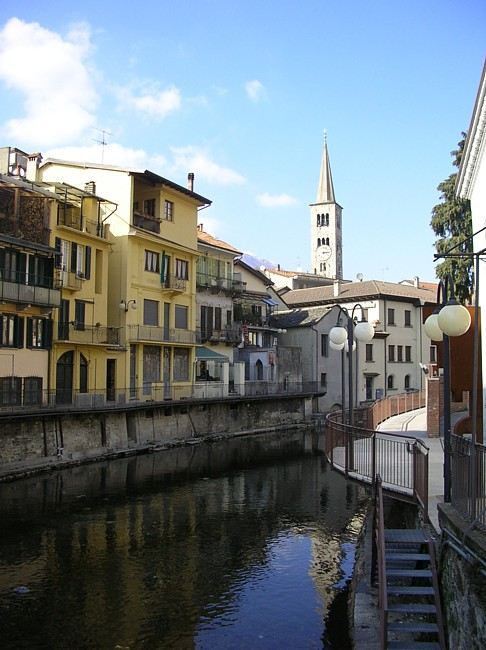
Omegna

== Demographics ==
As of 2026, the population is 152,677, of which 48.8% are male, and 51.2% are female. Minors make up 12.3% of the population, and seniors make up 29.2%.

Historical population

Year	Pop.	±%
1861	102,798	—
1871	107,244	+4.3%
1881	111,181	+3.7%
1901	120,935	+8.8%
1911	129,606	+7.2%
1921	132,445	+2.2%
1931	133,138	+0.5%
1936	133,198	+0.0%

Year	Pop.	±%
1951	148,487	+11.5%
1961	156,709	+5.5%
1971	168,910	+7.8%
1981	170,096	+0.7%
1991	162,215	−4.6%
2001	159,040	−2.0%
2011	160,264	+0.8%
2021	154,249	−3.8%

Source: ISTAT

=== Immigration ===
As of 2025, immigrants make up 11.2% of the population. The 5 largest foreign countries of birth are Ukraine, Switzerland, Morocco, Romania, and Albania.

== Culture ==
=== UNESCO Sacred Mountains ===
In 2003, the Sacred Mountain of Domodossola and the Sacred Mountain of Ghiffa were inserted by UNESCO in the World Heritage List.

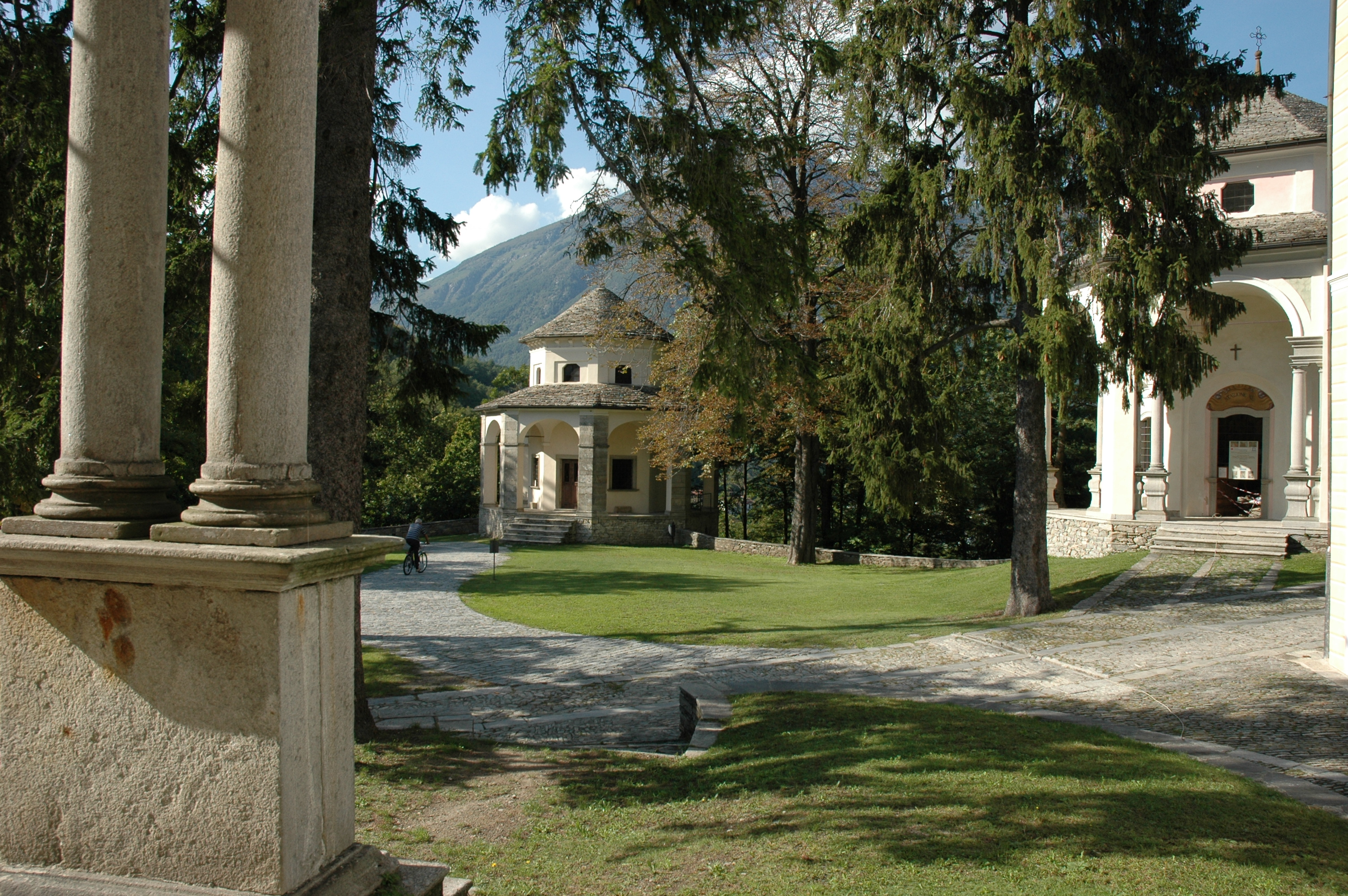
Sacro Monte di Domodossola
View of the chapels IX and XI

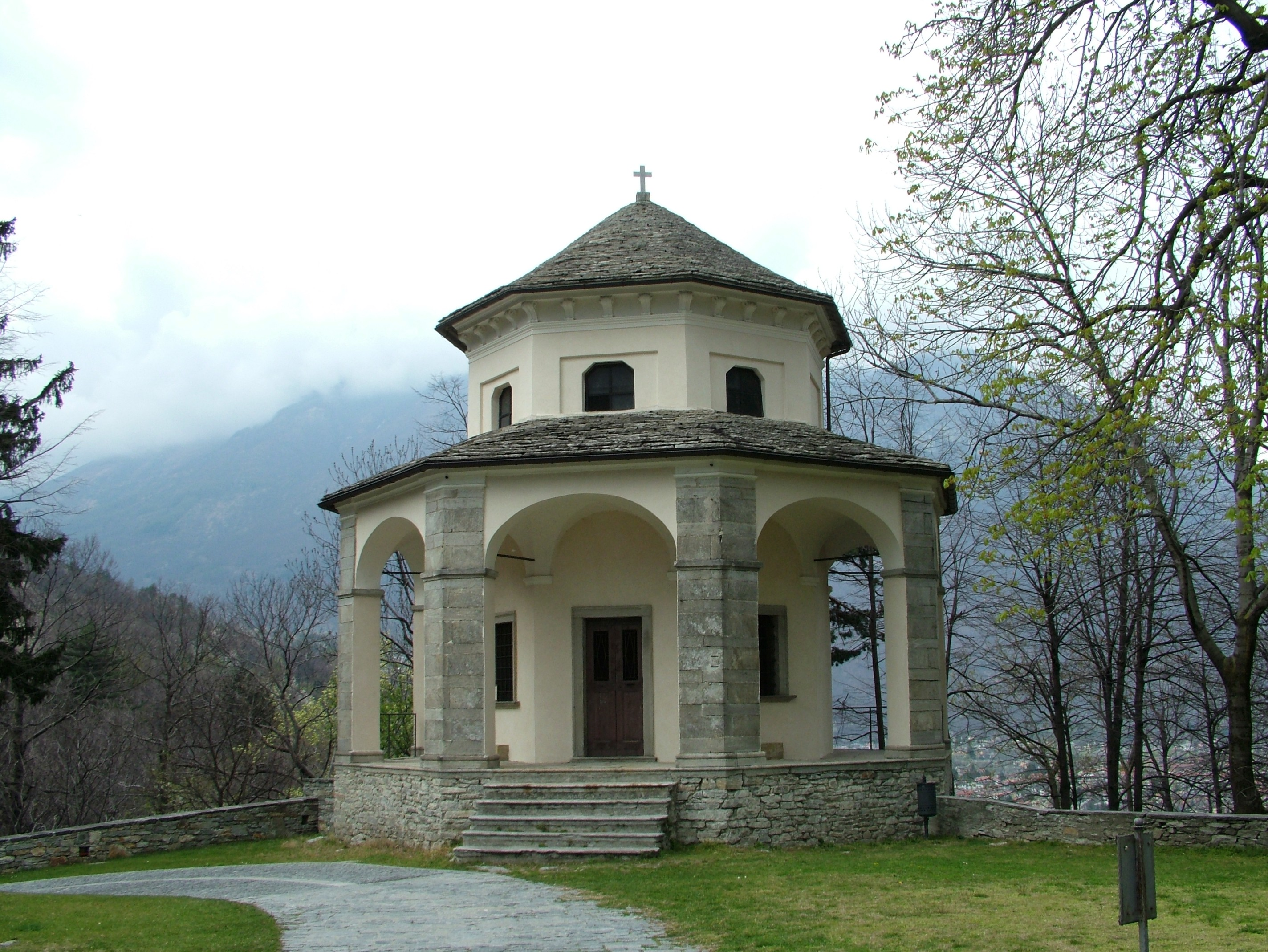
Sacro Monte di Domodossola
Chapel IX

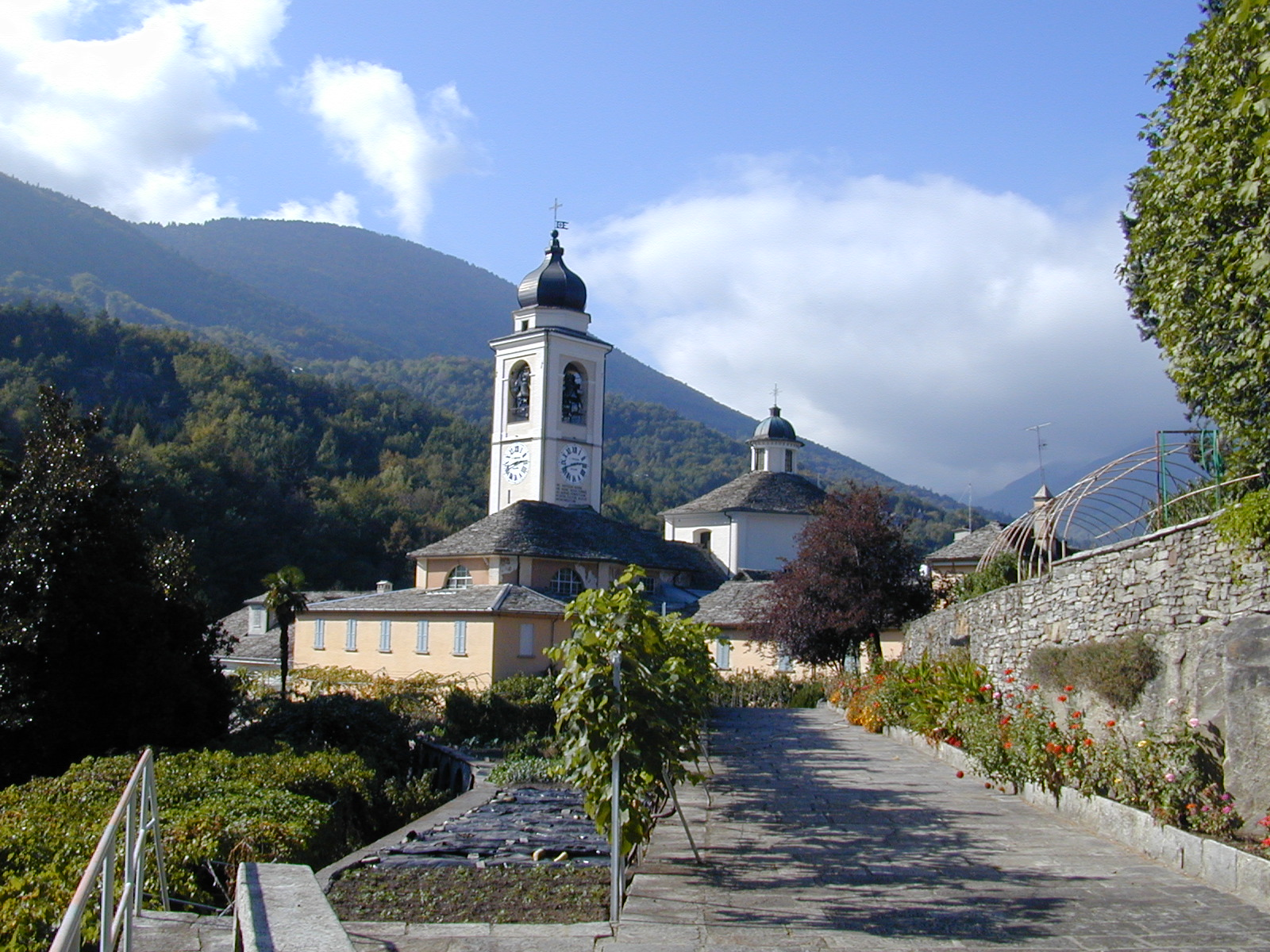
Sacro Monte di Domodossola

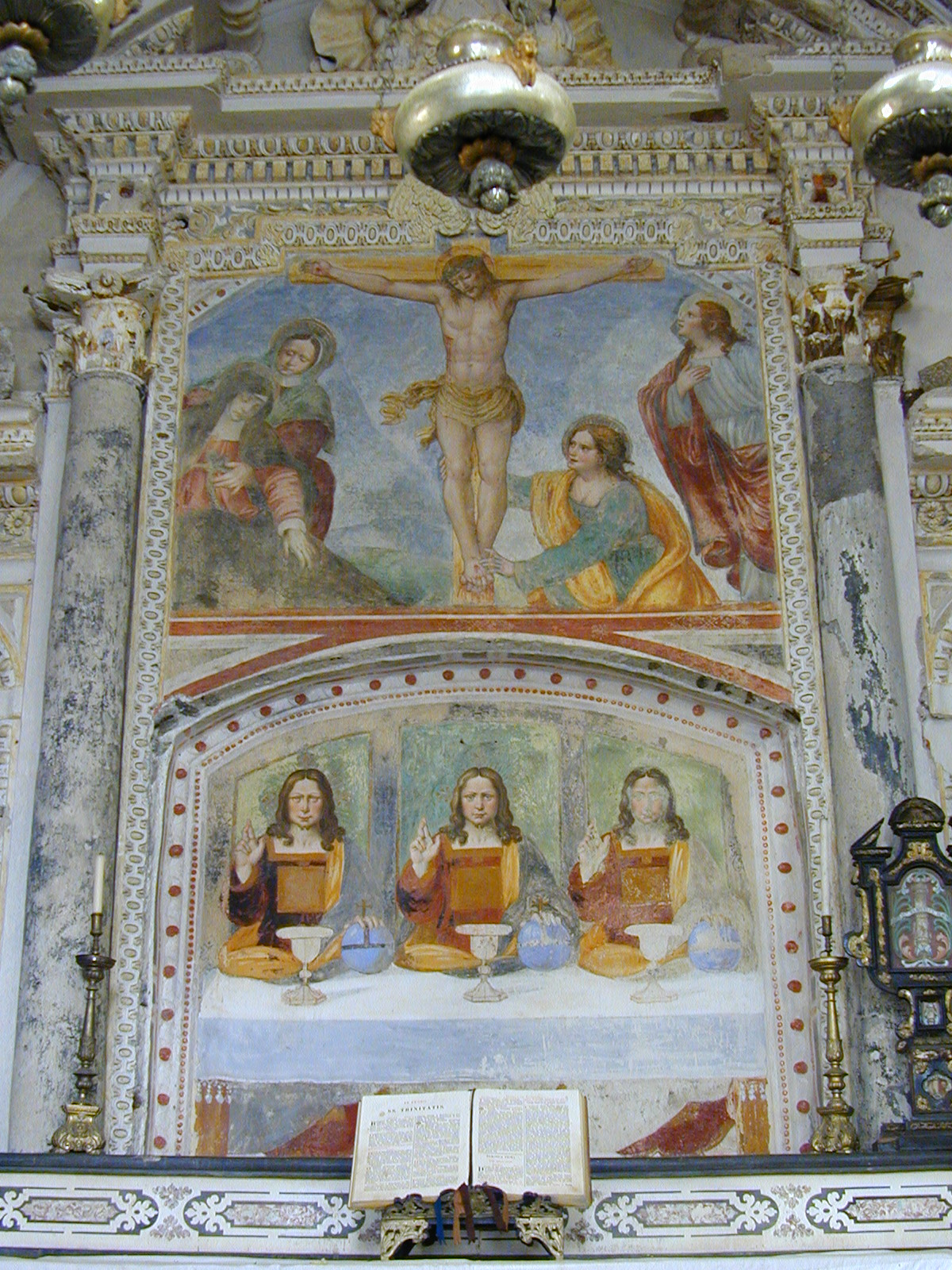
Sacro Monte di Ghiffa
Crucifixion and Trinity, 16th century

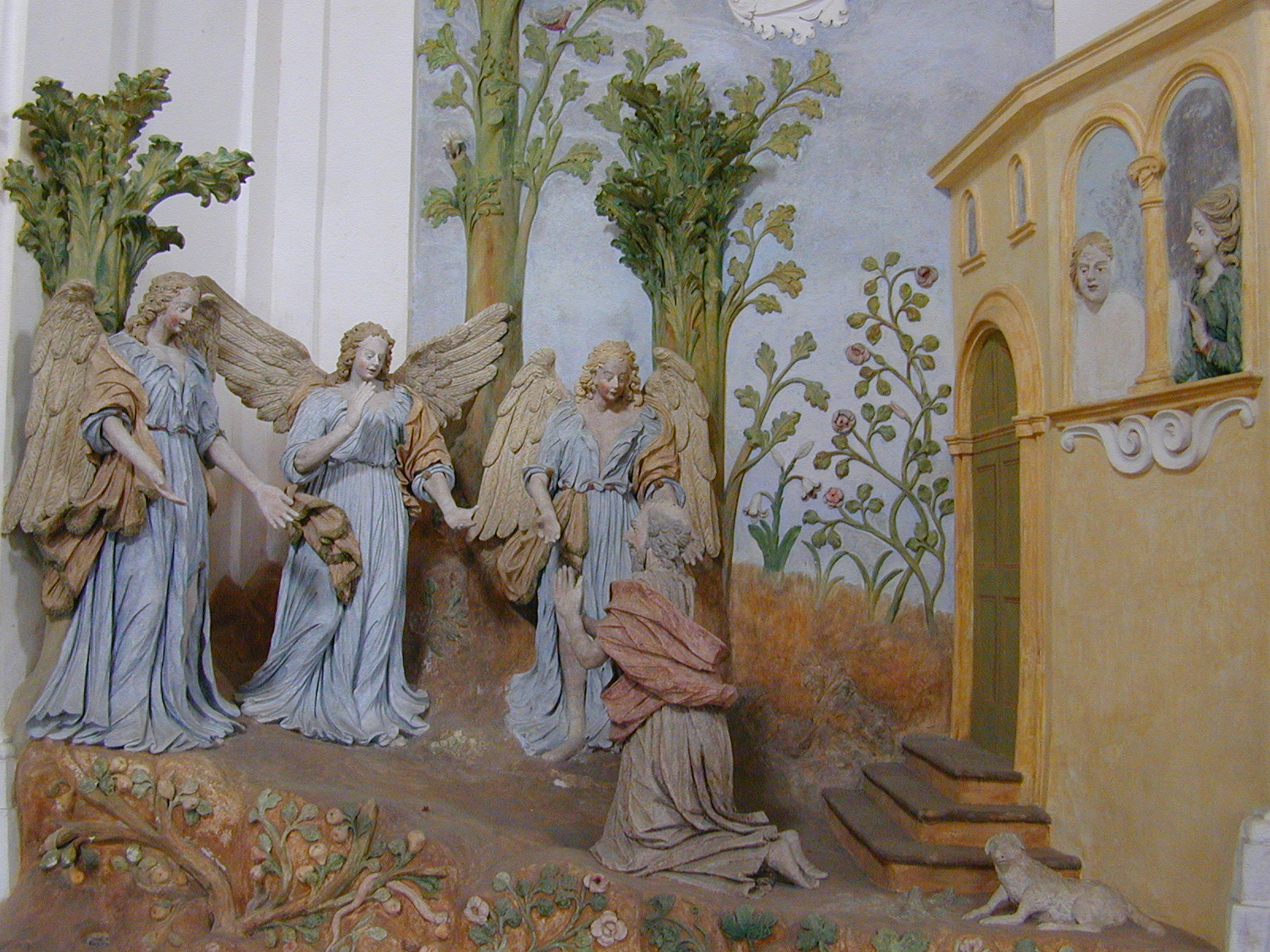
Sacro Monte di Ghiffa
Unknown artist of the 18th century, Three Angels visiting Abraham

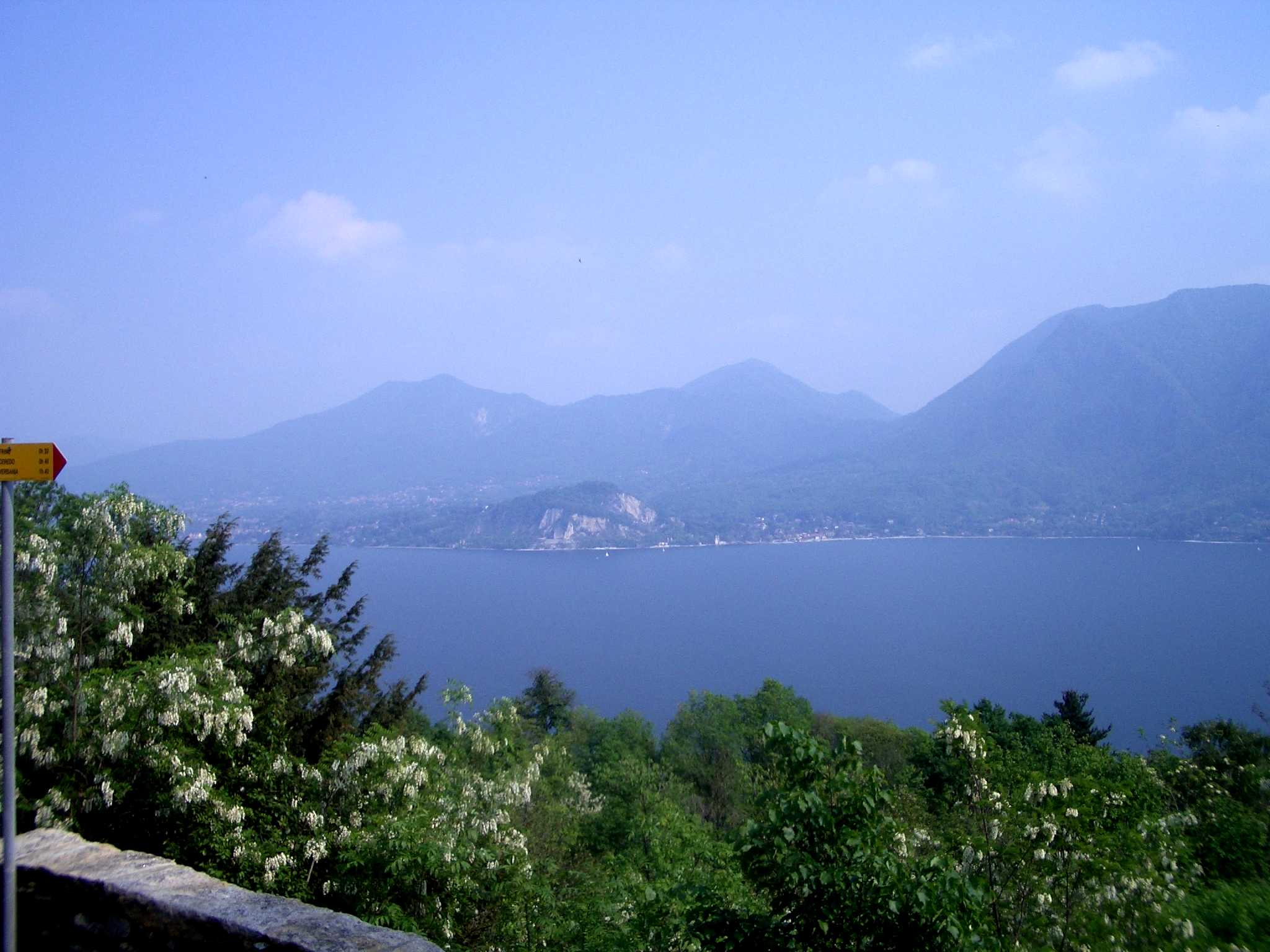
Sacro Monte di Ghiffa
Landscape from the Sacro Monte

=== Cuisine ===
Common in the whole Insubria area are bruscitti, originating from Alto Milanese, which consists of braised meat cut very thin and cooked in wine and fennel seeds, historically obtained by stripping leftover meat.

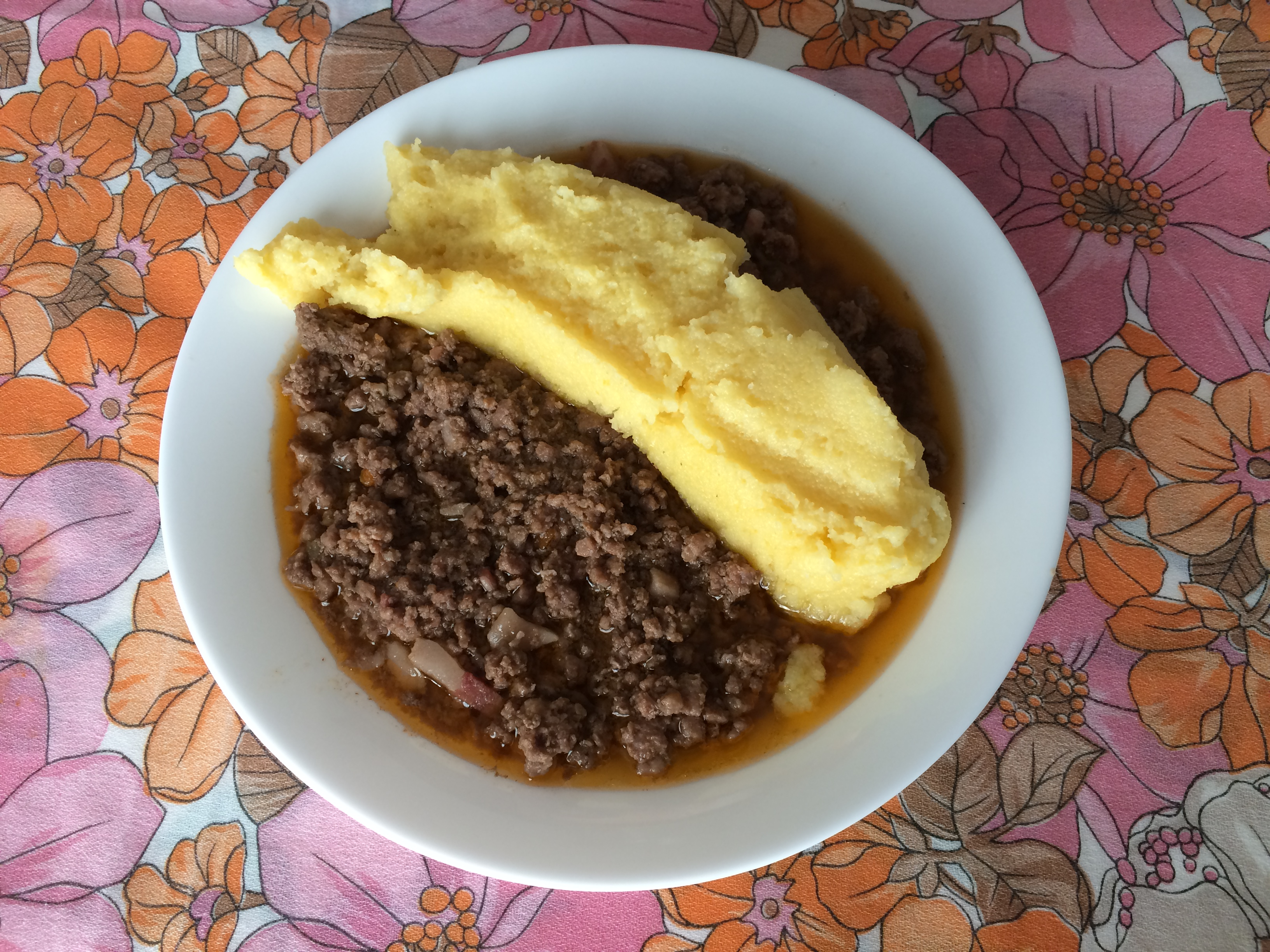
Bruscitti served with polenta porridge

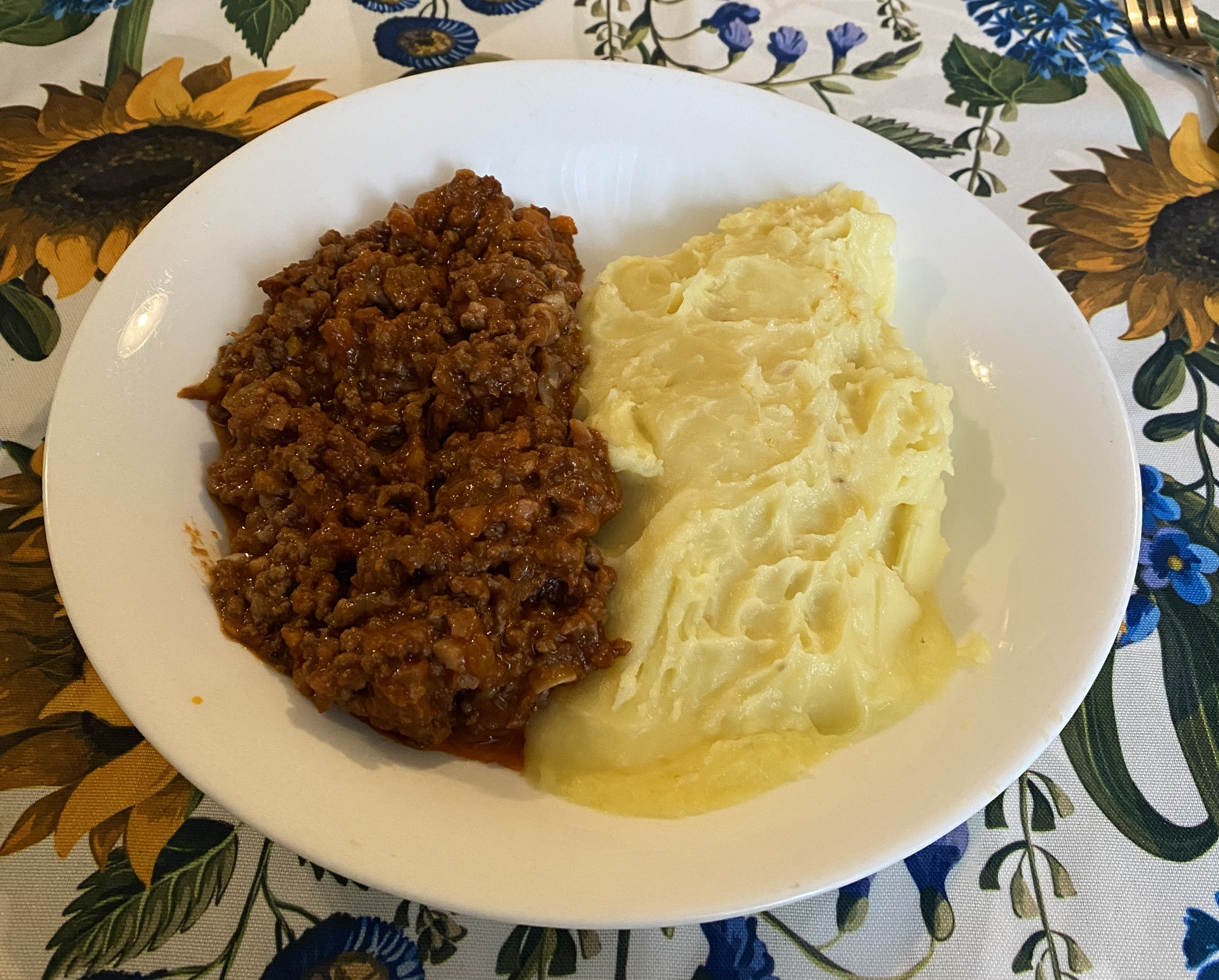
Bruscitti served with purée

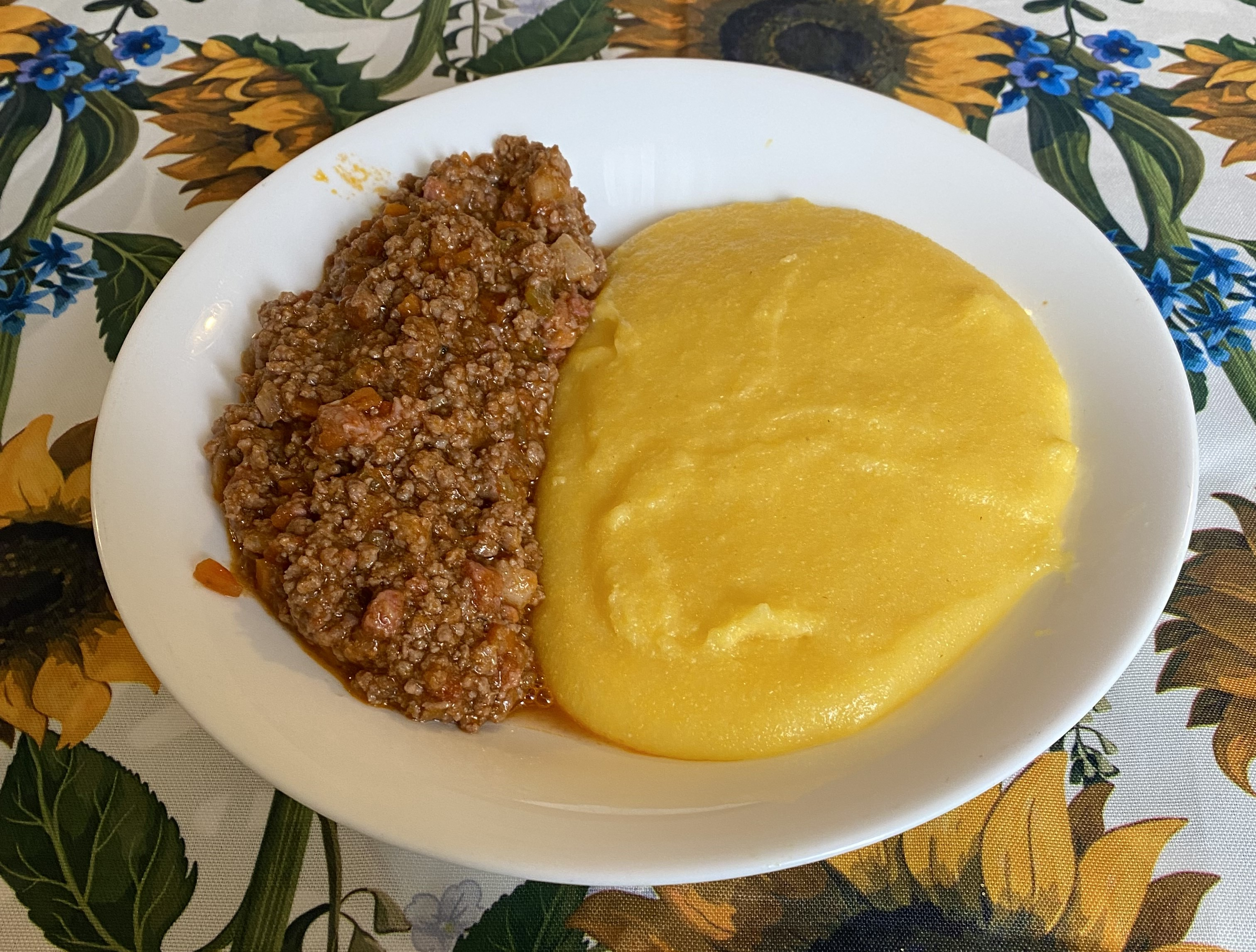
Bruscitti served with polenta porridge

== Transport ==
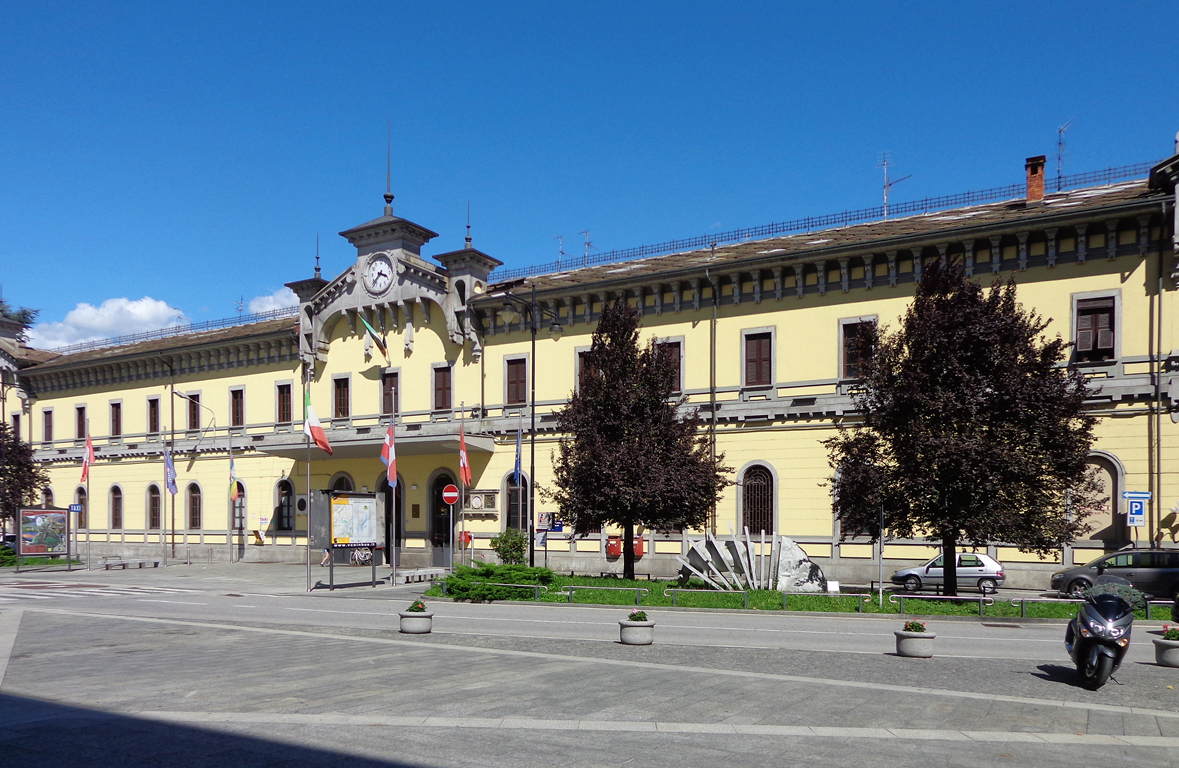
Domodossola railway station

=== Motorways ===
The province is crossed by the following motorways (in Italian, autostrade):

- Autostrada A26: Genoa-Gravellona Toce

=== Railway lines ===
- Domodossola–Milan railway
- Domodossola–Locarno railway line
- Domodossola-Novara railway

== See also ==
- Lake d'Avino
- Lake Castel
