= Ghiffa =

- Comune
- Comune di Ghiffa
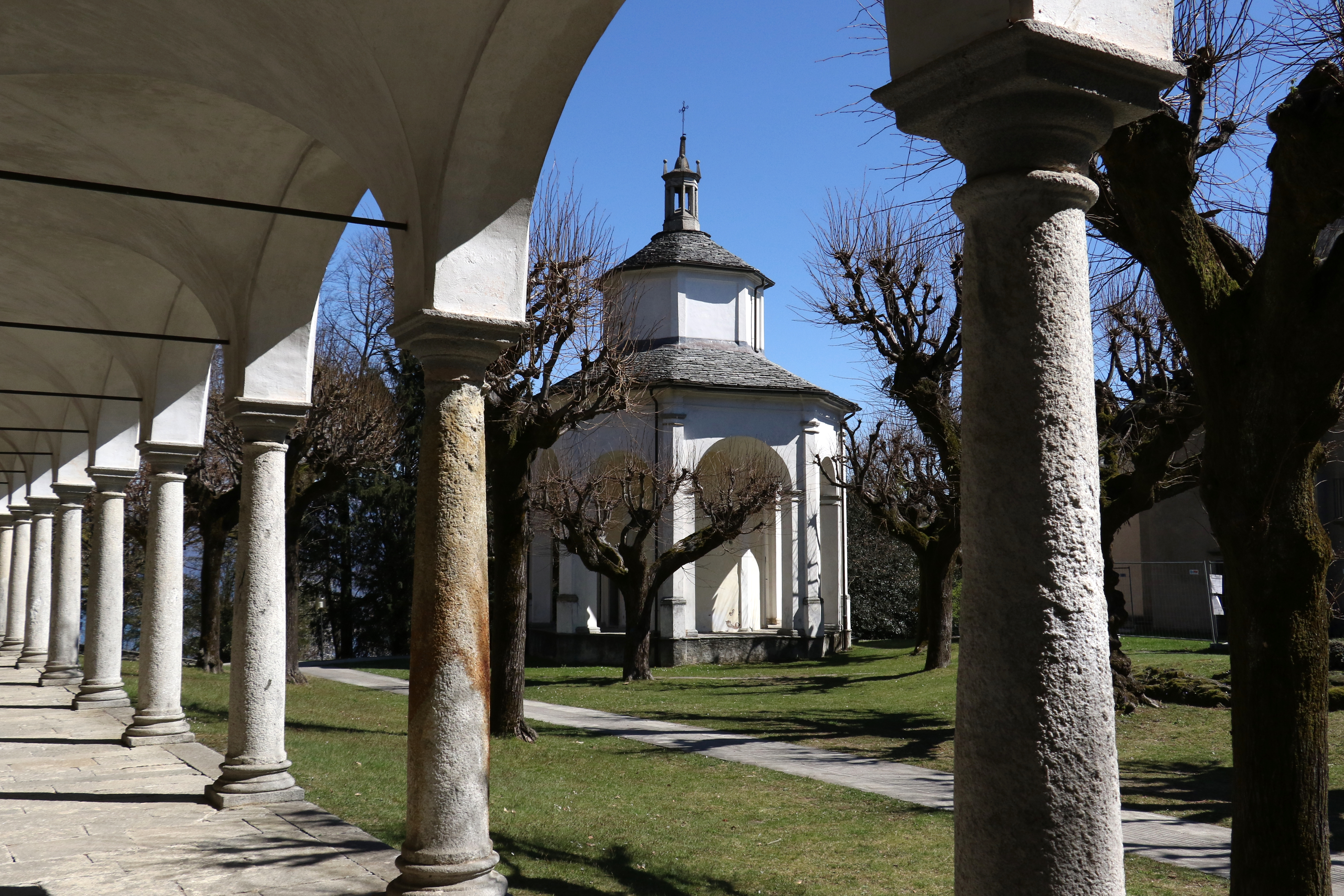
- Sacro Monte di Ghiffa

- Coat of arms

- Location within Italy Location within Piedmont
- Coordinates: 45°57′N 8°37′E
- Country: Italy
- Region: Piedmont
- Province: Verbano-Cusio-Ossola (VB)
- Frazioni: Carpiano, Cargiago, Caronio, Ceredo, Deccio, Frino, Ronco, San Maurizio, Selva, Susello

Government
  - Mayor: Matteo Lanino

Area
  - Total: 13.95 km^{2} (5.39 sq mi)
- Elevation: 201 m (659 ft)

Population (30 September 2008)
  - Total: 2,385
  - Density: 171.0/km^{2} (442.8/sq mi)
- Demonym: Ghiffesi
- Time zone: UTC+1 (CET)
  - Summer (DST): UTC+2 (CEST)
- Postal code: 28823
- Dialing code: 0323
- Website: Official website

Ghiffa (Ghifa in Lombard) is a comune (municipality) in the Province of Verbano-Cusio-Ossola in the Italian region Piedmont, located about 120 kilometres (75 mi) northeast of Turin and about 7 kilometres (4 mi) northeast of Verbania on the western shore of the Lake Maggiore.

It is most famous for the Sacro Monte, a site of pilgrimage and worship close to it, inserted by UNESCO in the World Heritage List.

== Notable people ==
- Peter Troubetzkoy – lived in Ghiffa
- Greg London – Las Vegas entertainer
