= Verbania =

- Comune
- Città di Verbania
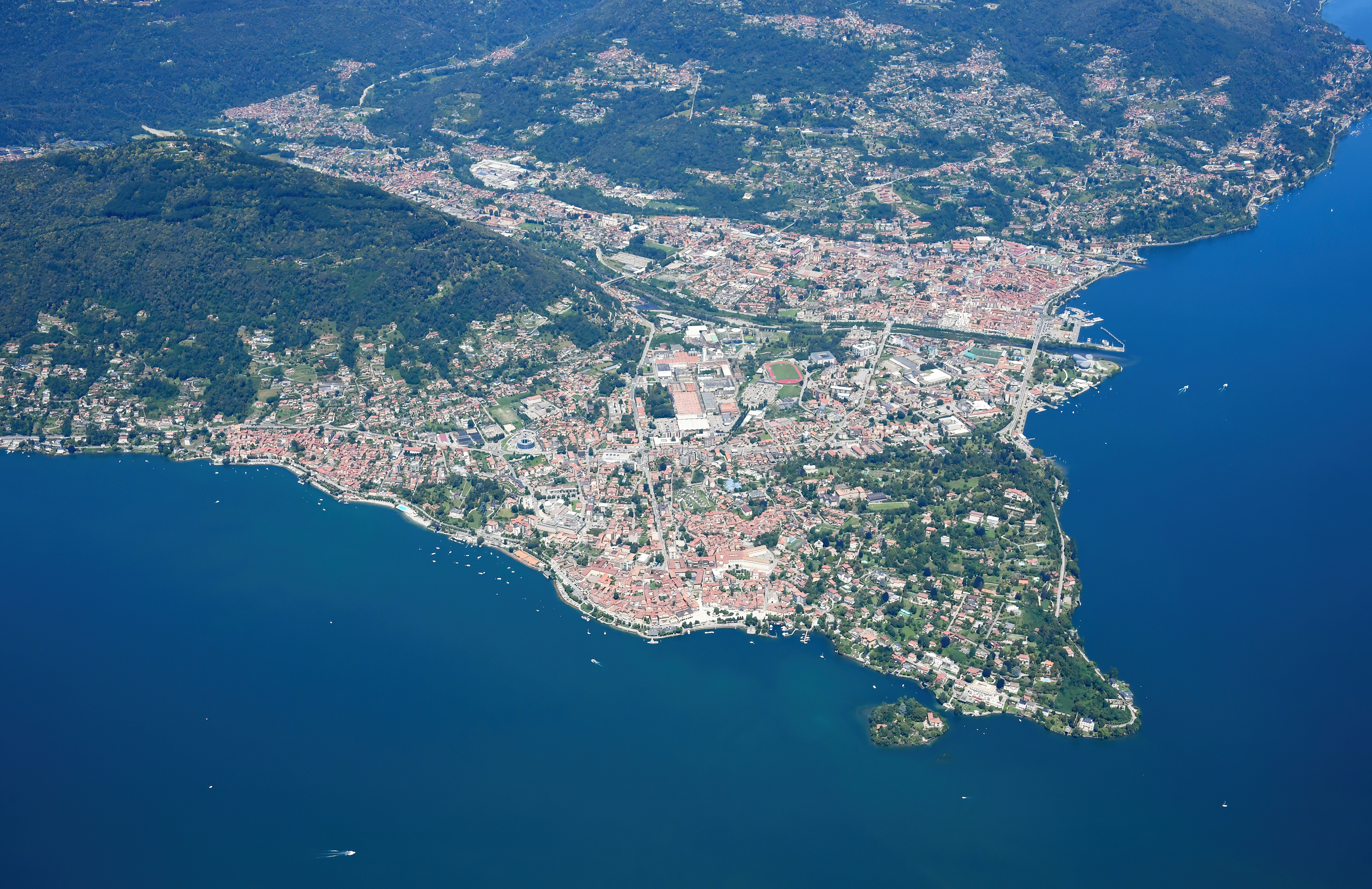
- Aerial view of Verbania from the south

- Coat of arms

- Location within Italy Location within Piedmont
- Coordinates: 45°56′N 08°32′E
- Country: Italy
- Region: Piedmont
- Province: Verbano-Cusio-Ossola (VB)
- Frazioni: Antoliva, Bieno, Biganzolo, Cavandone, Fondotoce, Intra, Pallanza, Possaccio, Suna, Tre Ponti, Torchiedo, Trobaso, Zoverallo

Government
  - Mayor: Silvia Marchionini (PD)

Area
  - Total: 37.49 km^{2} (14.47 sq mi)
- Highest elevation: 678 m (2,224 ft)
- Lowest elevation: 200 m (660 ft)

Population (1 January 2021)
  - Total: 30,104
  - Density: 803.0/km^{2} (2,080/sq mi)
- Demonym: Verbanese(i)
- Time zone: UTC+1 (CET)
  - Summer (DST): UTC+2 (CEST)
- Postal code: 28900, 28921-28925
- Dialing code: 0323
- Patron saint: Victor Maurus
- Saint day: 8 May
- Website: Official website

Verbania (Italian: [verˈbaːnja], Lombard: [ʋerˈbaɲa], Piedmontese: [ʋerˈbɑɲa]) is the most populous comune (municipality) and the capital city of the province of Verbano-Cusio-Ossola in the Piedmont region of northwest Italy. It is situated on the shore of Lake Maggiore, about 91 km (57 mi) north-west of Milan and about 40 km (25 mi) from Locarno in Switzerland. It had a population of 30,827 on 1 January 2017.

== History ==
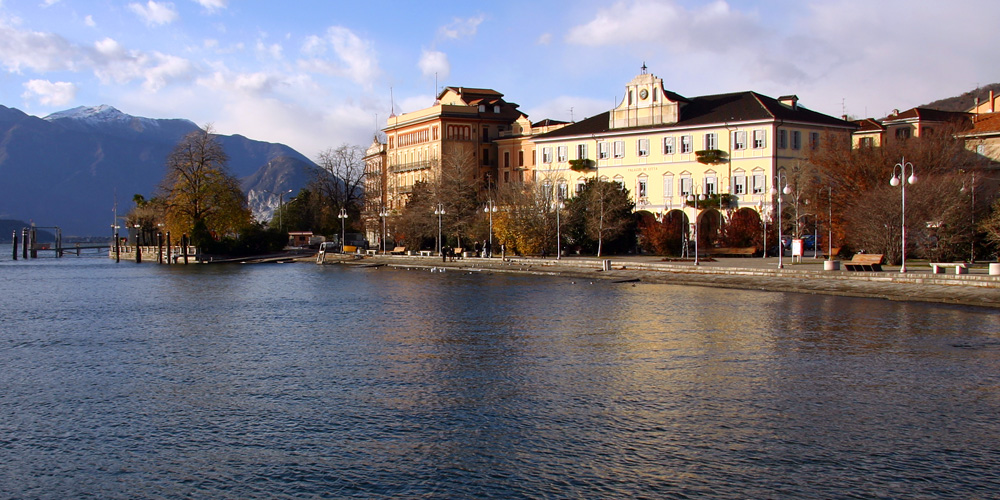
View of Pallanza with the municipal building of Verbania

The area has been inhabited since prehistoric times. The oldest known people living in the area were the Lepontii. The area was added to the Roman Empire by Emperor Augustus in the first century AD.

In the eleventh century the area was controlled by the bishops of Novara, then by the counts of Pombia. In 1152 Federico Barbarossa gave the area to the Castello family. After the death of Frederick Barbarossa, the territory was again controlled by Novara. By the fourteenth century, the area had become part of the Duchy of Milan. In 1714, following the Treaty of Rastatt most of the lake areas came under the control of the Habsburgs. After the 1796 Napoleonic invasion the area was controlled by the French. By 1818 the House of Savoy had gained control of the area back from the French. With the edict of 10 October 1836, Pallanza and Ossola became part of the province of Novara.

On 4 April 1939, Pallanza and Intra were merged by royal decree to form the municipality of Verbania. After the Second World War, the territory still remained part of the province of Novara. In 1976 the autonomous district of Verbano-Cusio-Ossola was established. In 1992, the district became an independent province, and Verbania was chosen as its capital.

== Overview ==
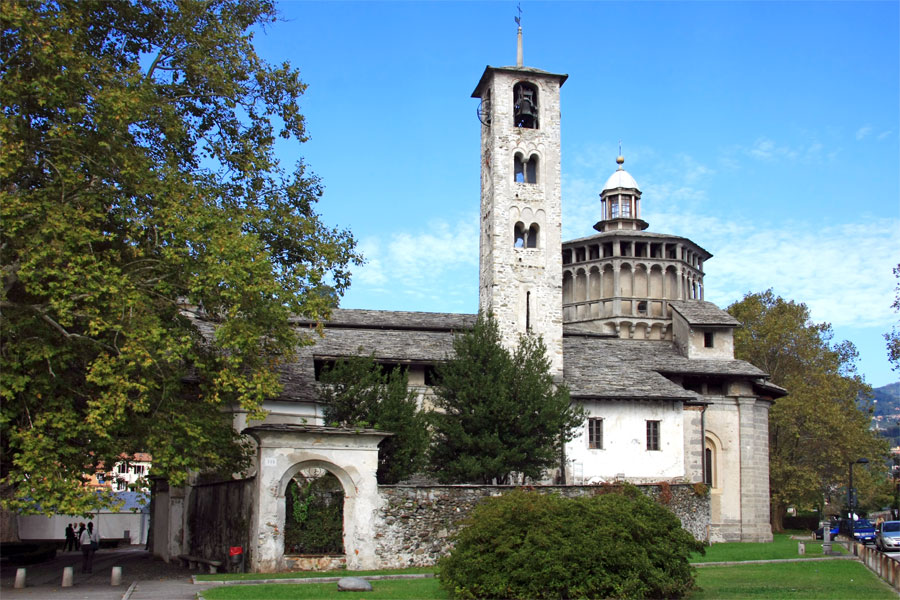
Church of Madonna di Campagna

Verbania faces the city of Stresa lying at a direct distance of 3.7 km (2 mi) across Lake Maggiore, and 16 km (10 mi) by road. A small islet lying a stone's throw from the shores of Pallanza and separated from it by a narrow stretch of water just 10 or 15 metres wide, known as the Isolino di San Giovanni, is famous for having been the home of Arturo Toscanini between the years of 1927 and 1952.

Verbania consists of the following localities: Antoliva, Bieno, Biganzolo, Cavandone, Fondotoce, Intra, Pallanza, Possaccio, Suna, Torchiedo, Trobaso and Zoverallo.

== Climate ==
The climate is temperate, humid, with hot summer and continental type influences in the inland and higher areas. The area is characterized by cold winters and hot summers.

Climate data for Verbania (2006–2020)
Month	Jan	Feb	Mar	Apr	May	Jun	Jul	Aug	Sep	Oct	Nov	Dec	Year
Mean daily maximum °C (°F)	7.9 (46.2)	9.6 (49.3)	14.8 (58.6)	18.4 (65.1)	22.2 (72.0)	26.9 (80.4)	28.9 (84.0)	27.8 (82.0)	23.9 (75.0)	18.0 (64.4)	12.5 (54.5)	8.7 (47.7)	18.3 (64.9)
Daily mean °C (°F)	4.3 (39.7)	5.6 (42.1)	10.1 (50.2)	13.7 (56.7)	17.5 (63.5)	22.1 (71.8)	24.0 (75.2)	23.1 (73.6)	19.4 (66.9)	14.3 (57.7)	9.1 (48.4)	5.1 (41.2)	14.0 (57.3)
Mean daily minimum °C (°F)	0.8 (33.4)	1.6 (34.9)	5.4 (41.7)	9.1 (48.4)	12.8 (55.0)	17.4 (63.3)	19.0 (66.2)	18.3 (64.9)	14.9 (58.8)	10.5 (50.9)	5.7 (42.3)	1.5 (34.7)	9.8 (49.5)
Average precipitation mm (inches)	79 (3.1)	88 (3.5)	127 (5.0)	144 (5.7)	154 (6.1)	153 (6.0)	109 (4.3)	143 (5.6)	164 (6.5)	186 (7.3)	162 (6.4)	55 (2.2)	1,564 (61.7)
Average precipitation days (≥ 1.0 mm)	6	7	8	9	12	10	8	10	8	8	9	5	100
Source 1: Climi e viaggi
Source 2: Enea-Casaccia (precipitation 1961–1990)

== Main sights ==
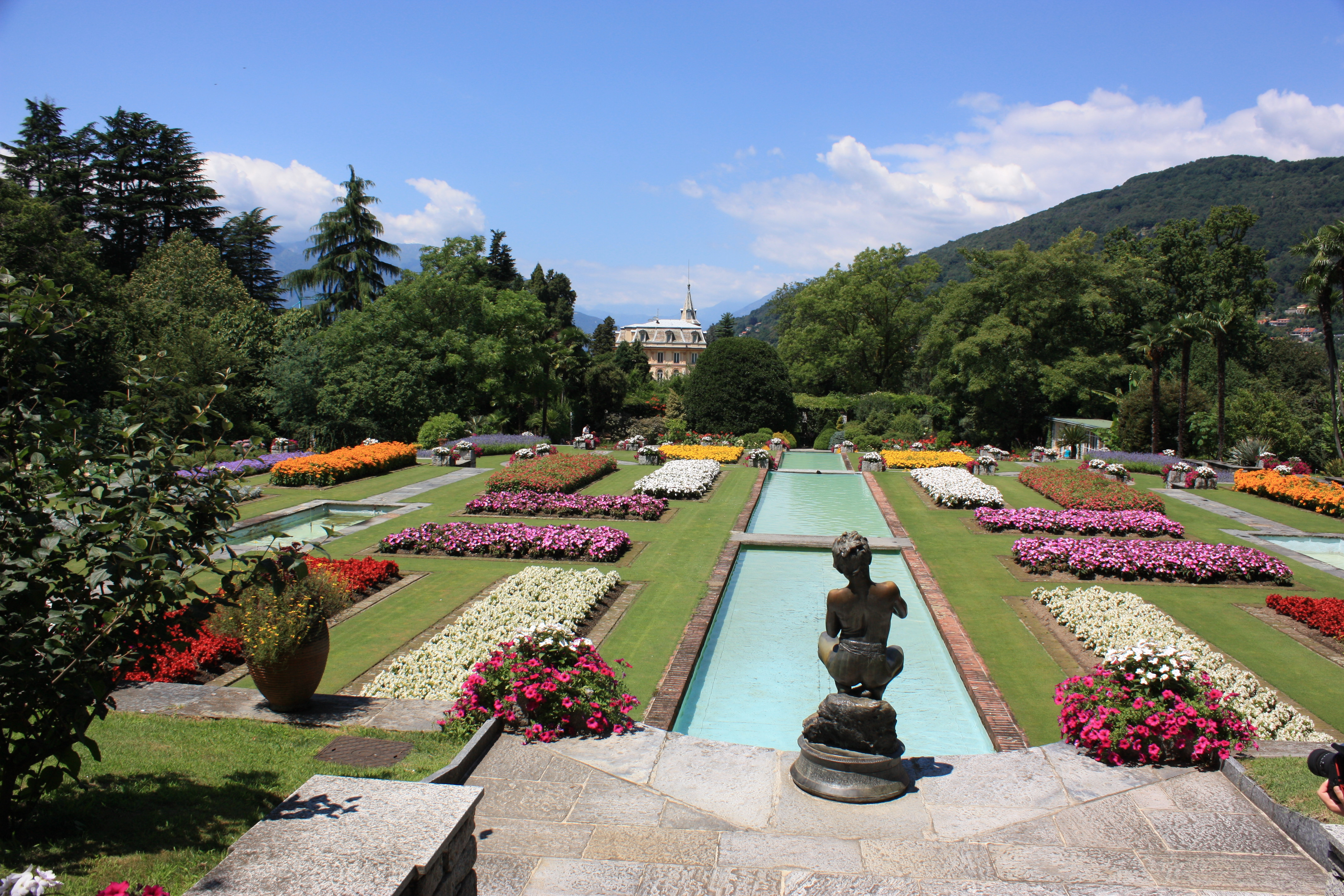
Villa Taranto

Giardini Botanici Villa Taranto is an estate with fine botanical gardens.

== Transport ==
Verbania-Pallanza railway station, opened in 1905, forms part of the Milan–Domodossola railway. It is in the Fondotoce district, between Lake Mergozzo and the river Toce, just upstream from where the Toce flows into Lake Maggiore. A bus connects Verbania to the rail station in Fondotoce.

== International relations ==
=== Twin towns – Sister cities ===
Verbania is twinned with the following cities and towns:

- Bourg-de-Péage, France
- Crikvenica, Croatia
- East Grinstead, United Kingdom
- Mindelheim, Germany
- Sant Feliu de Guíxols, Spain
- Schwaz, Austria
- Piatra Neamț, Romania
- (United States) Hendersonville, North Carolina, USA

== Notable people ==
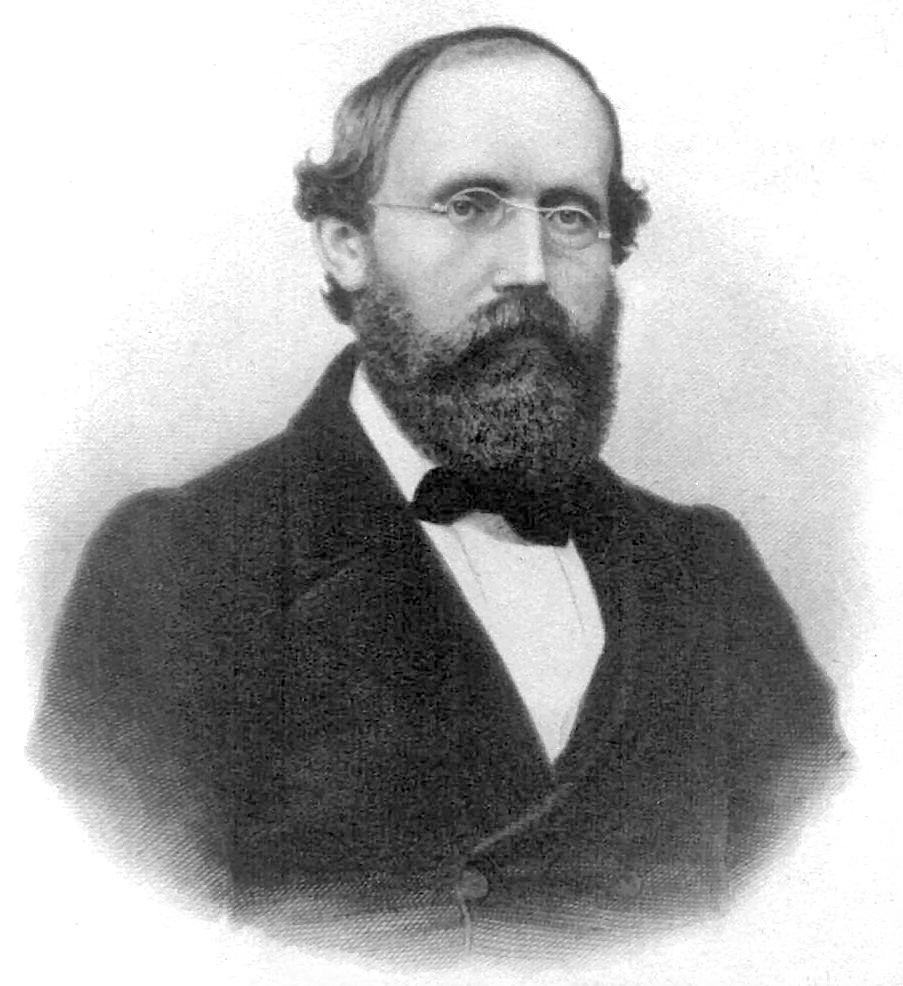
Bernhard Riemann, 1863

=== Arts and sciences ===
- Luigi Cadorna (1850–1928), Field Marshal of Italy during World War I
- Raffaele Cadorna, Jr. (1889–1973), general
- Emma Morano (1899–2017), former world's oldest living person from 12 May 2016 until her death on 15 April 2017
- Daniele Ranzoni (1843-1889), artist
- Bernhard Riemann (1826–1866), mathematician
- Giovanni Domenico Zucchinetti, organist and music teacher.

=== Sport ===
- Beniamino Bonomi (b. 1968), canoeist
- Emanuela Brizio (b. 1968), mountain runner
- Angelo Pagotto (b. 1973), footballer
- Elisa Longo Borghini (b. 1991), cyclist
- Filippo Ganna (b. 1996), cyclist
- Wilfried Gnonto (b. 2003), footballer

== See also ==
- S.S. Verbania Calcio
- István Türr#Pallanza Dignitary
- Intra
- Pallanza
