= Via del Mercato =

Hiking path in Italy and Switzerland

The Market way (Via del Mercato) is a hiking trail that connects Locarno with Domodossola, through the Centovalli and the Val Vigezzo. The way uses ancient path and mule tracks used in the past centuries by merchants transporting goods from Italy and Switzerland. In the early 20th century the Centovalli railway was built in order to develop the commerce and is nowadays a main tourist attraction.

Today hikers can walk the 62 km path dividing it in four stages or they can also use the railways that run along the tracks.

This way is part of the itinerary CoEur - In the heart of European paths.

== The history ==
The "Via del Mercato", from the Middle Ages to the 19th century, was the way travelled by merchants, woodsmen, stockmen and migrants passing because of work from the Ticino to the Ossola. This connection was used since ancient times because it is an easy way through the mountains, due to the periadriatic seam, the geologic fault along which are aligned the Val Vigezzo, Locarno, Bellinzona and the Valtellina.

The importance of this marginal land is lately declined, but many proofs of arts and culture are still present in the Val Vigezzo.

The ancient road has been replaced by the present road, but it is still possible to find the old path thanks to the ways that connect villages and the ancient smuggling ways.

== Main sights ==
Along the Via del Mercato there are many points of historical and anthropological interest.

=== Santuario della Madonna in Re ===
The Santuario della Madonna del Sangue in Re, built in neo-Byzantine style, pursuant to a miracle that happened in 1494, became a main religious point in the area.

=== The "Good-bye chapel" in Gagnone ===
The so-called "Good-bye chapel" was the place where the paysant said good-bye to their relatives who emigrate.

=== Sant'Abbondio in Masera ===
The church of Sant'Abbondio in Masera was the starting point of the old road of Vigezzo. The church has been abandoned for centuries, but it was recently restored and it is now possible admire the Romanesque architecture.

=== Santa Maria Maggiore ===
Santa Maria Maggiore is the heart of the Val Vigezzo. The parish church, originally built before 1000, was rebuilt in the 18th century and decorated with frescos made by local painter Giuseppe Maria Borgnis.

==== The "Rossetti Valentini" school of art ====
The Val Vigezzo is called the "valley of painters" and this tradition continues today thanks to the "Rossetti Valentini" school of art and its gallery.

==== The Chimney sweeper Museum ====
The Chimney sweeper Museum in Santa Maria Maggiore conserve pictures, objects and tools of a forgotten profession, that played and important role in the economy of the Val Vigezzo.

==== The Val Vigezzo's "Piazza dei Miracoli" ====
The main square in Craveggia village is called the Val Vigezzo's "Piazza dei Miracoli" because it holds two important religious buildings: the parish church and the baptistery. In the church is kept the Treasure of the King of France.

=== The Centovalli villages ===
Arrived in Switzerland you find the villages of Camedo, Borgnone, Lionza, Verdasio, Pila and Intragna, connected by roads and mule tracks. Intragna has the tallest bell tower (65 m) of all the Ticino. There is also the Museo etnografico regionale delle Centovalli e del Pedemonte, that collects the history of the area in the past centuries.

== See also ==
- CoEur - In the heart of European paths
- Via Francigena
- Camino de Santiago
- UNESCO
- Via del Mercato 2018
