= Cavaglio-Spoccia =

- Comune
- Comune di Cavaglio-Spoccia
- Coat of arms

- Location within Italy Location within Piedmont
- Coordinates: 46°4′9″N 8°36′30″E
- Country: Italy
- Region: Piedmont
- Province: Province of Verbano-Cusio-Ossola (VB)
- Frazioni: Cavaglio, Gurrone, Lunecco and Spoccia

Area
  - Total: 18.2 km^{2} (7.0 sq mi)
- Elevation: 697 m (2,287 ft)

Population (Dec. 2004)
  - Total: 273
  - Density: 15.0/km^{2} (38.8/sq mi)
- Time zone: UTC+1 (CET)
  - Summer (DST): UTC+2 (CEST)
- Postal code: 28052
- Dialing code: 0323

Cavaglio-Spoccia was a comune (municipality) in the Province of Verbano-Cusio-Ossola in the Italian region Piedmont, located about 140 kilometres (87 mi) northeast of Turin and about 20 kilometres (12 mi) northeast of Verbania, on the border with Switzerland. As of 31 December 2004, it had a population of 273 and an area of 18.2 square kilometres (7.0 mi^{2}). The municipality consisted of the villages of Cavaglio, Gurrone, Lunecco and Spoccia.

On 1 January 2019 the municipalities of Cursolo-Orasso, Cavaglio-Spoccia and Falmenta merged into the municipality of Valle Cannobina.

Cavaglio-Spoccia bordered the following municipalities: Brissago (Switzerland), Cannobio, Cursolo-Orasso, Falmenta, Gurro, Palagnedra (Switzerland).

== Demographic evolution ==
Historical population

Year	Pop.	±%
1861	1,013	—
1871	1,105	+9.1%
1881	1,054	−4.6%
1901	862	−18.2%
1911	896	+3.9%

Year	Pop.	±%
1921	856	−4.5%
1931	780	−8.9%
1936	709	−9.1%
1951	605	−14.7%
1961	522	−13.7%

Year	Pop.	±%
1971	418	−19.9%
1981	371	−11.2%
1991	320	−13.7%
2001	309	−3.4%

Source: Data from ISTAT
