= Cursolo-Orasso =

- Comune
- Comune di Cursolo-Orasso
- Coat of arms

- Location within Italy Location within Piedmont
- Coordinates: 46°6′N 8°34′E
- Country: Italy
- Region: Piedmont
- Province: Province of Verbano-Cusio-Ossola (VB)
- Frazioni: Cursolo, Orasso

Area
  - Total: 20.9 km^{2} (8.1 sq mi)
- Elevation: 886 m (2,907 ft)

Population (Dec. 2004)
  - Total: 115
  - Density: 5.50/km^{2} (14.3/sq mi)
- Time zone: UTC+1 (CET)
  - Summer (DST): UTC+2 (CEST)
- Postal code: 28050
- Dialing code: 0323

Cursolo-Orasso was a comune (municipality) in the Province of Verbano-Cusio-Ossola in the Italian region Piedmont, located about 130 kilometres (81 mi) northeast of Turin and about 20 kilometres (12 mi) north of Verbania, on the border with Switzerland. As of 31 December 2004, it had a population of 115 and an area of 20.9 square kilometres (8.1 mi^{2}). The municipality consisted of the villages of Cursolo and Orasso.

On 1 January 2019 the municipalities of Cursolo-Orasso, Cavaglio-Spoccia and Falmenta merged into the municipality of Valle Cannobina.

Cursolo-Orasso bordered the following municipalities: Cavaglio-Spoccia, Cossogno, Gurro, Malesco, Miazzina, Palagnedra (Switzerland), Re.

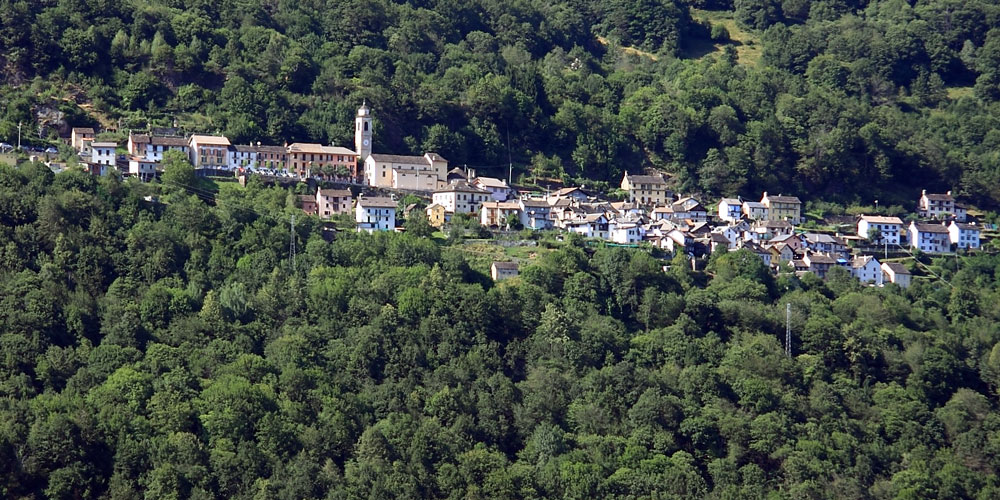
Cursolo

== Double sunrise and sunset ==
Orasso sees two sunrises and two sunsets during the winter. Between 25 November and 17 January, Mount Riga temporarily blocks daylight, causing the first sunset and second sunrise. Roosters are confused, crowing for both sunrises.

== Demographic evolution ==
Historical population

Year	Pop.	±%
1861	487	—
1871	510	+4.7%
1881	615	+20.6%
1901	734	+19.3%
1911	692	−5.7%

Year	Pop.	±%
1921	724	+4.6%
1931	571	−21.1%
1936	531	−7.0%
1951	504	−5.1%
1961	431	−14.5%

Year	Pop.	±%
1971	327	−24.1%
1981	260	−20.5%
1991	168	−35.4%
2001	119	−29.2%

Source: Data from ISTAT
