= Camedo =

- Municipality
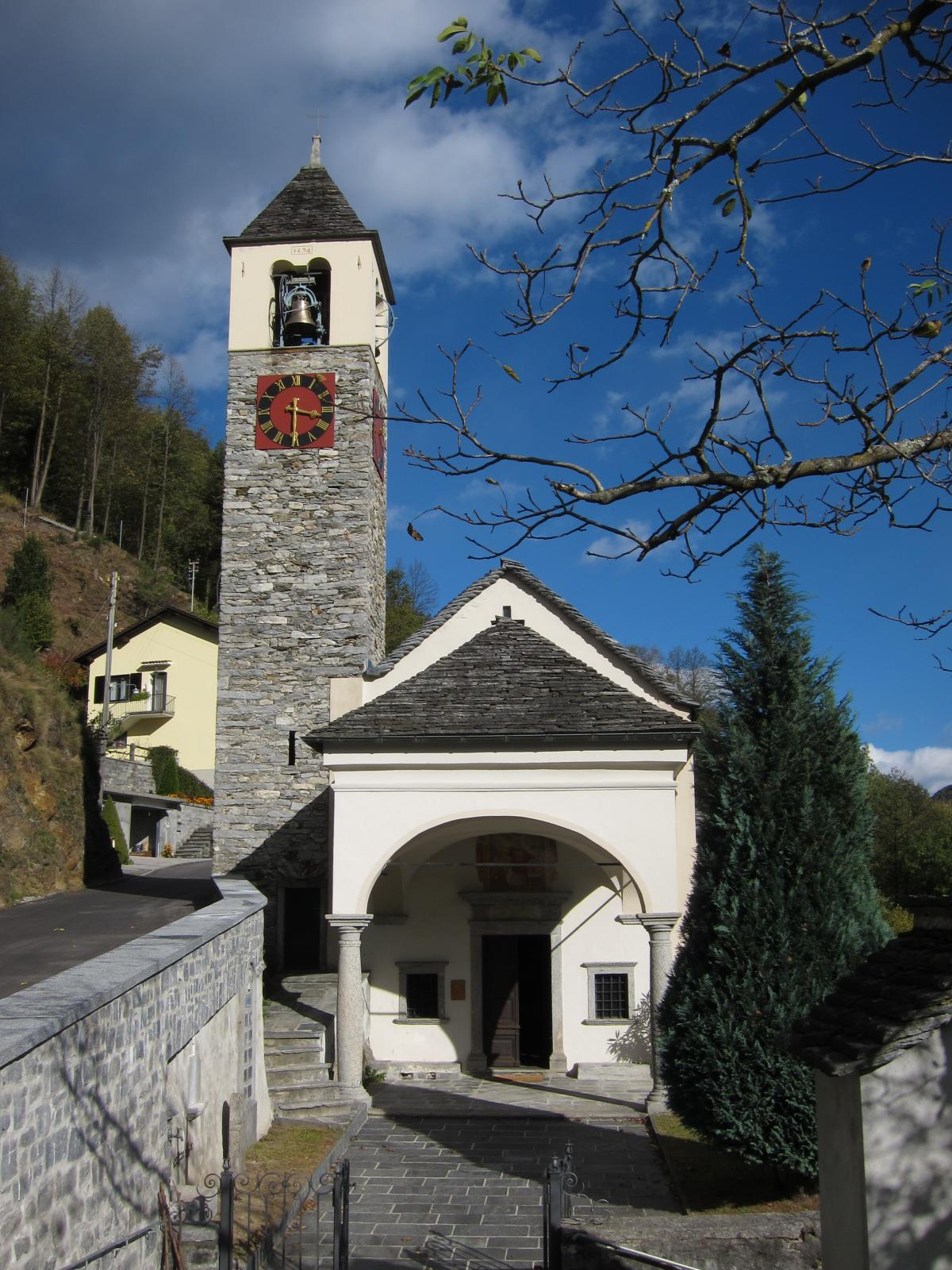
- San Lorenzo oratory (Camedo)
- Location of Camedo
- Location within Switzerland Location within Canton of Ticino
- Coordinates: 46°09′21.3″N 8°36′29.3″E
- Country: Switzerland
- Canton: Ticino
- District: Locarno
- Elevation: 594 m (1,949 ft)
- Time zone: UTC+01:00 (CET)
  - Summer (DST): UTC+02:00 (CEST)
- Postal code: 6659
- SFOS number: 5397
- ISO 3166 code: CH-TI
- Website: http://centovalli.swiss

Camedo is a Swiss village near the border with Italy. Camedo is part of the Swiss municipality of Centovalli located in Canton Ticino (district of Locarno). Camedo is one of the most important villages among the 19 localities of Centovalli. due to its strategic location just at the border with Italy being an official border post. It is specifically mentioned in international bilateral treaties among Italy and Switzerland.

== History ==
Camedo was already mentioned in 1297.

After the dissolution of the municipality of Centovalli in 1838, Camedo became momentarily part of the municipality of much smaller Borgnone. However, Camedo retained its character and importance as a border post. The municipality of Centovalli was reinstated in 2009 with the merge of the old municipalities Intragna, Borgnone and Palagnedra into a single municipality.

Camedo was known for the smuggler stories and documentaries this given its geographical proximity to Italy and the fact that this village is the first stop of the FART Centovalli train after it crosses the Swiss border from Italy.

In 1964, a small textile factory was built in Camedo that employed Swiss and cross-border workers.

The bilateral agreement between the EU and Switzerland led to a reduction in the need of customs services located in Ribellasca (Camedo).

Currently this village and border post is particularly important for the transit of tourists and cross-border workers in and out of Switzerland with over 2'000 cross border workers commuting each day.

== Location ==
Camedo is located in the Locarno district, on the northern slope of the Centovalli at an elevation of 600 m (2,000 ft). It is located in Switzerland near the border with Italy. It limits with the Swiss localities of Borgnone and Moneto and with Italy. Camedo's exact location

Google maps shows this village incorrectly listed as being either Borgnone or a part of it (Borgnone is a different village altogether with a different post code). Camedo is a village on its own right and can be found correctly listed on the other online maps services as well as on the official federal service Maps of Switzerland. Addresses in Camedo must be written ending in “6659 Camedo” as per Swiss postal regulations.

== Culture & Tourism ==
Camedo is the first Swiss village when entering Swiss territory from Italy through the Vigezzo Valley which changes name into Centovalli Valley.

A popular hiking route starting in Camedo and finishing in Intragna through the Old Market Way is a popular outdoor activity.

San Lorenzo's oratory was built in the 17th century, with the date 1694 inscribed in the bell tower. The Tuscan-style portico, with a fresco of Saint Lawrence above the door, was added in 1725. Outside, some crosses and tombstones testify to the custom of burying the dead around the church before the current cemetery was built (early decades of the 20th century). The choir valley presents three scenes from the martyr's life, of discreet workmanship, made by the painter Giacomo Pedrazzi of Cerentino in 1862. Inside, an altarpiece depicting St. Lawrence and a frontal in scagliola from the mid-eighteenth century signed by Giuseppe Maria Pancaldi . The side chapel of the Rosary has a silver-plated copper statue of the Madonna dating back to 1859. The bell tower has four bells cast in the years 1845 and 1833; in 2000 it was equipped with a clock and in 2006 with a fifth bell and an electrification system. In front of the oratory is the first of a series of chapels that represented a VI crucis up to Borgnone, most of which, however, were destroyed during the construction of the cantonal road.

Camedo has also hosted the Centovalli Festival Camedo in 2016 and 2018 and hosts the artist community of theatre, music and food "Atelier Teatro di Camedo" who among other activities offers a monthly film showing.

There is also a small guesthouse and restaurant “Osteria Grütli” offering good quality food and accommodation.

== Infrastructure & Transport ==
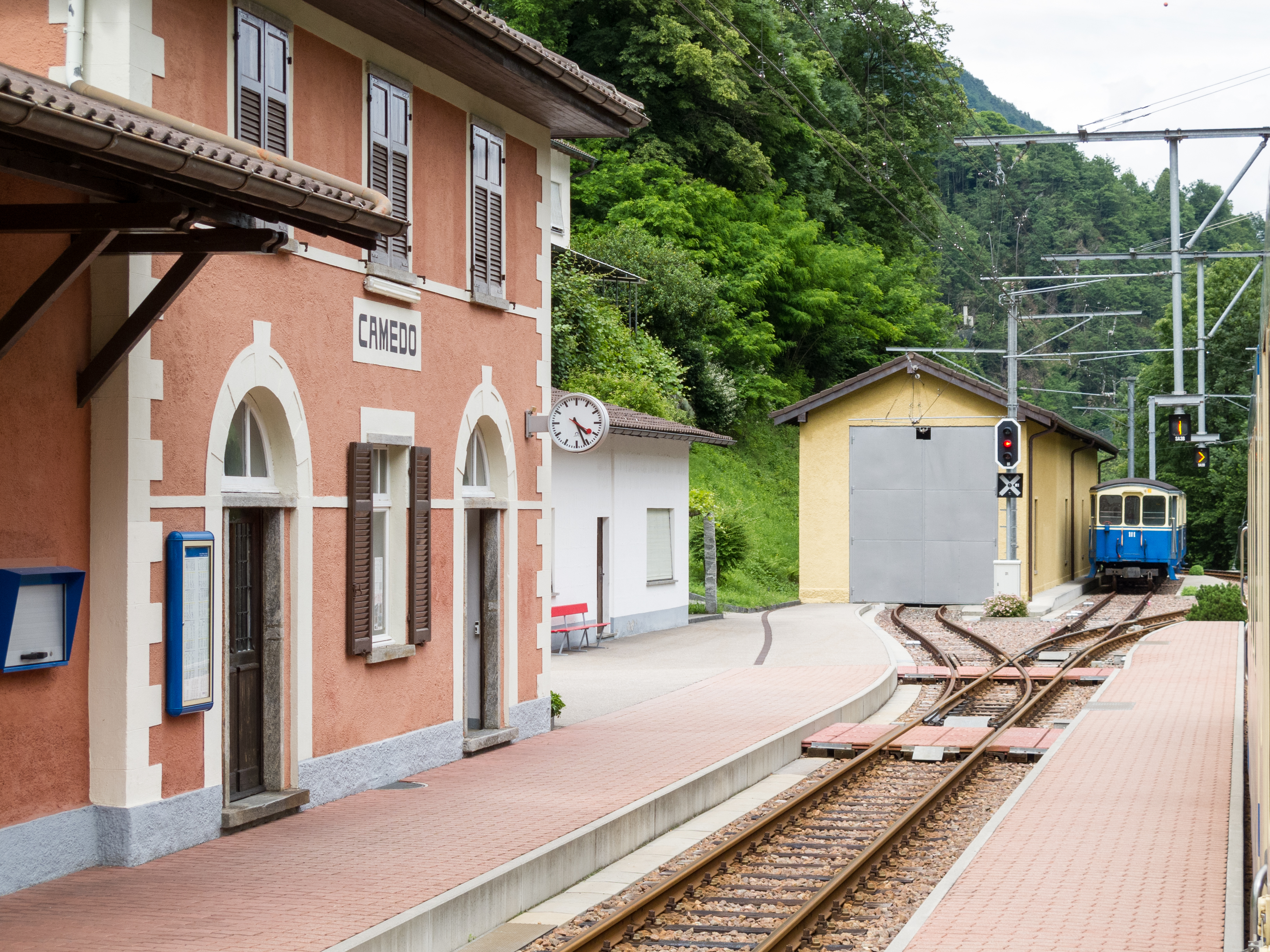
Camedo Station

Camedo is well served by Camedo station of the Centovalli Railway, the train that runs between Domodossola (Italy) and Locarno (Switzerland). Camedo station is the last Swiss train station before leaving Swiss territory towards Italy.

The village is also reachable by car through the cantonal road from Locarno and Intragna that runs through the Centovalli valley towards the Vigezzo Valley into Italy turning into Italian State road 337 (SS337). Camedo is about 30 minutes away by car from the city of Locarno and about 40 minutes from the city of Domodossola (Italy).
