= Falmenta =

- Comune
- Comune di Falmenta
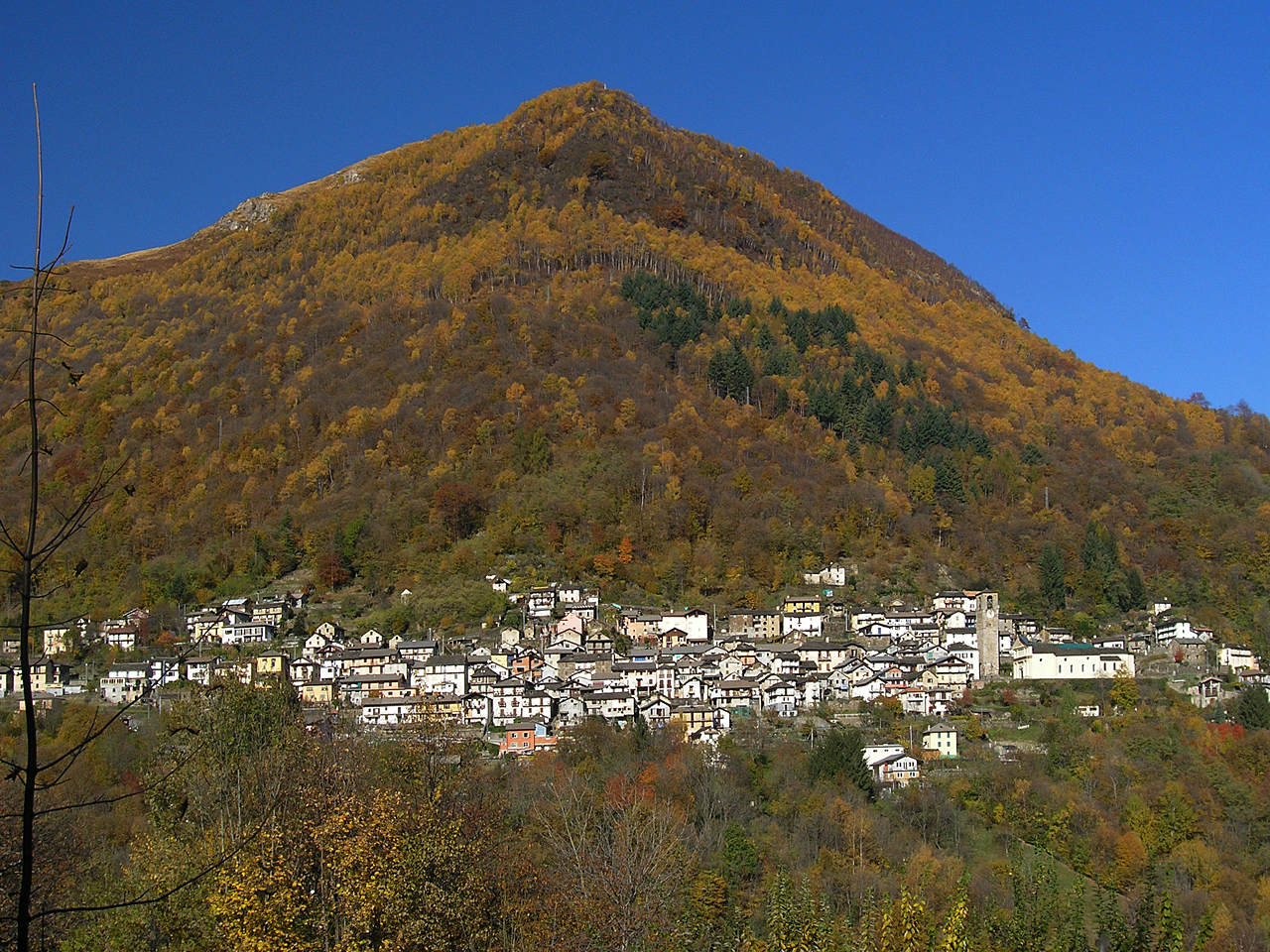
- Falmenta as seen from Crealla

- Location within Italy Location within Piedmont
- Coordinates: 46°4′N 8°35′E
- Country: Italy
- Region: Piedmont
- Province: Province of Verbano-Cusio-Ossola (VB)
- Frazioni: Crealla

Area
  - Total: 16.2 km^{2} (6.3 sq mi)
- Elevation: 715 m (2,346 ft)

Population (Dec. 2004)
  - Total: 201
  - Density: 12.4/km^{2} (32.1/sq mi)
- Time zone: UTC+1 (CET)
  - Summer (DST): UTC+2 (CEST)
- Postal code: 28050
- Dialing code: 0323

Falmenta was a comune (municipality) in the Province of Verbano-Cusio-Ossola in the Italian region Piedmont, located about 130 kilometres (81 mi) northeast of Turin and about 15 kilometres (9 mi) north of Verbania. As of 31 December 2004, it had a population of 201 and an area of 16.2 square kilometres (6.3 mi^{2}).

On 1 January 2019 the municipalities of Cursolo-Orasso, Cavaglio-Spoccia and Falmenta merged into the municipality of Valle Cannobina.

Falmenta bordered the following municipalities: Aurano, Cannobio, Cavaglio-Spoccia, Gurro, Miazzina, Trarego Viggiona.

== Demographic evolution ==
Historical population

Year	Pop.	±%
1861	1,494	—
1871	1,587	+6.2%
1881	1,719	+8.3%
1901	1,561	−9.2%
1911	1,536	−1.6%

Year	Pop.	±%
1921	1,452	−5.5%
1931	1,173	−19.2%
1936	1,032	−12.0%
1951	857	−17.0%
1961	729	−14.9%

Year	Pop.	±%
1971	541	−25.8%
1981	438	−19.0%
1991	319	−27.2%
2001	231	−27.6%

Source: Data from ISTAT
