= Brissago =

- Municipality
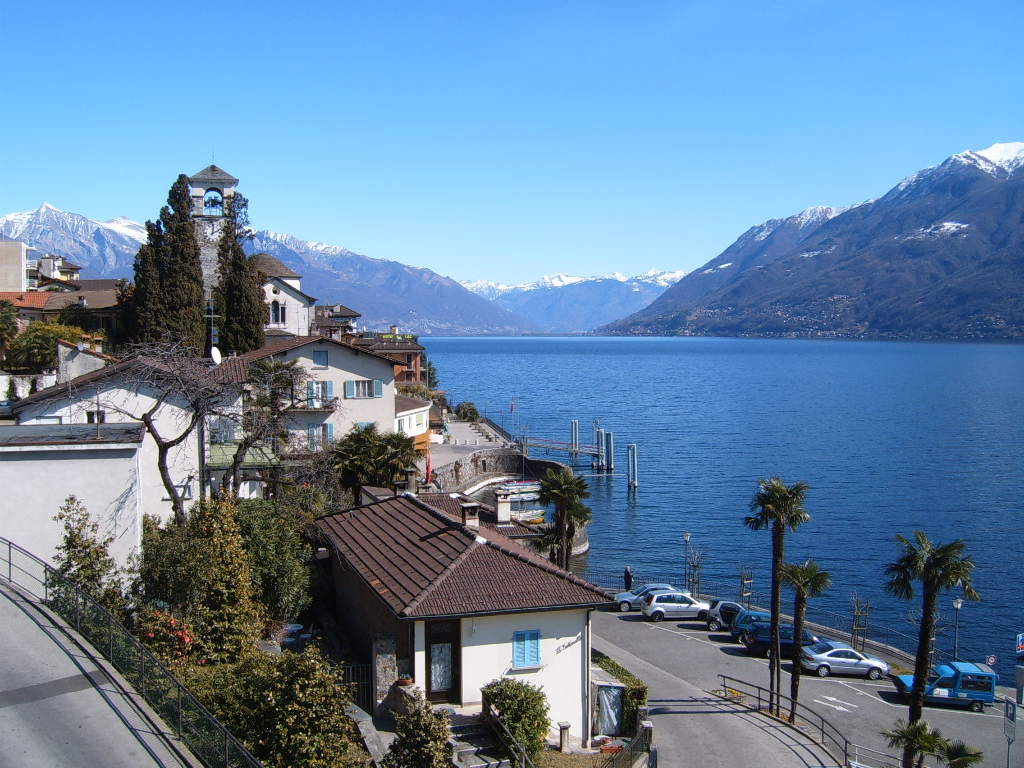

- Flag Coat of arms
- Location of Brissago
- Location within Switzerland Location within Canton of Ticino
- Coordinates: 46°7′N 8°42′E
- Country: Switzerland
- Canton: Ticino
- District: Locarno

Government
  - Mayor: Sindaco

Area
  - Total: 17.79 km^{2} (6.87 sq mi)
- Elevation: 197 m (646 ft)

Population (2004)
  - Total: 1,877
  - Density: 105.5/km^{2} (273.3/sq mi)
- Time zone: UTC+01:00 (CET)
  - Summer (DST): UTC+02:00 (CEST)
- Postal code: 6614
- SFOS number: 5097
- ISO 3166 code: CH-TI
- Surrounded by: Ascona, Cannobio (IT-VB), Caviano, Gerra (Gambarogno), Intragna, Maccagno con Pino e Veddasca (IT-VA), Palagnedra, Ronco sopra Ascona, San Nazzaro, Sant'Abbondio, Tronzano Lago Maggiore (IT-VA), Valle Cannobina (IT-VB).
- Website: www.brissago.ch

Brissago (Italian: [brisˈsaːɡo], Swiss Standard German: [brɪˈsaːɡoː]) is a municipality in the district of Locarno in the canton of Ticino in Switzerland, bordering Italy. Brissago lies on the western shore of Lake Maggiore and includes the Brissago Islands.

== History ==
An ax and ceramic pieces from the Neolithic era as well as Roman coins and other finds, discovered in 1846 in Brenscino, indicate that the area was prehistorically settled. In 1863, during the construction of the main road, some graves were discovered. Fragments of a grave stele with inscriptions were built into the (now destroyed) Church of San Pancrazio on Isola Grande.

Brissago is first mentioned in 1289 as Brixago. It used to be known by the German name of Brisa, though this is no longer used.

During the Middle Ages the fortunes of the village were closely tied to those of the parish and court of Cannobio in the county of Stazzona. After the fragmentation of the county in the 11th-12th Centuries, Brissago was on the outskirts of the areas of influence of Milan and Como. Its relative isolation allowed to develop into an Imperial community with great autonomy. By the middle of the 13th century, it had its own village law, with the first version appearing in 1289. The community consisted of the three village cooperatives (vicinia) Costa di Piodina, Costa di Mezzo and Costa di Dentro, which were probably in turn were divided into degagne. The local council selected three community leaders (Consoli), one for each vicinia who were supported by council members and some lower officials.

The entire municipality was ruled by a Podestà, who was initially appointed by the Visconti family of Milan. The Podestà was recruited from 1342 until the end of Old Swiss Confederacy rule in 1798, from among the Orelli family, a noble family in Locarno. Also, in 1342, the Visconti added Brissago into the capitaneria of Lake Maggiore. Between 1439 and 1520 the community had to help finance the military spending of Locarno, despite maintaining a certain degree of autonomy under the aegis of Count Rusca. The 16th century was marked by feuds between the Rainaldi and Baciocchi families. Following the creation of an independent republic in Brissago in 1520, it became an Associate of the Swiss Confederation. It became part of the Bailiwick of Locarno, but remained a special judicial district with its own Podestà. Under the Helvetic Republic it was part of the district of Locarno. Then in 1803, it became an independent political municipality in the new Canton of Ticino. During the Italian Risorgimento it was a refuge and center of weapons smuggling and underground literature for the Lombard refugees.

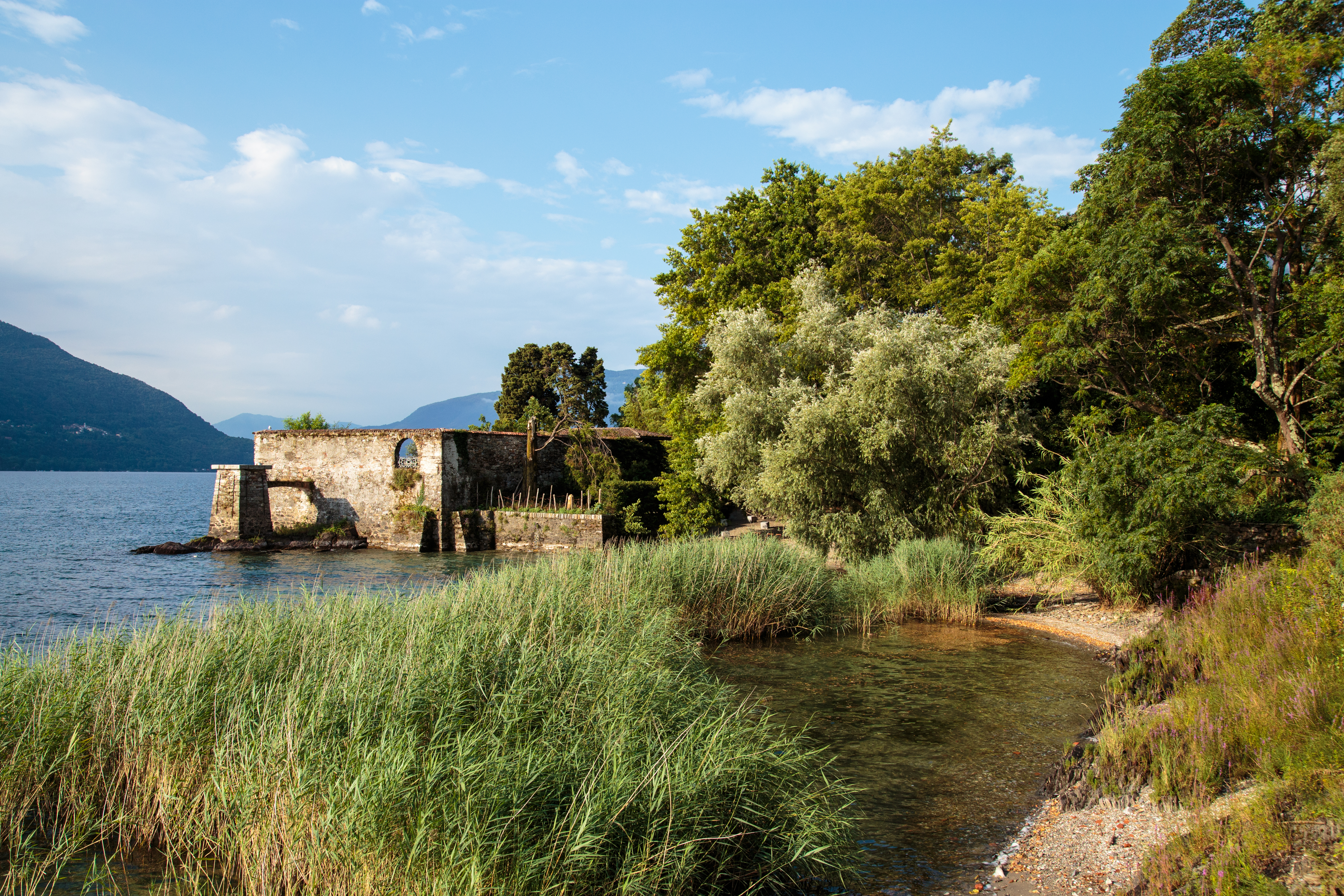
Botanical Gardens on Isola Grande

The village church was under the authority of the diocese of Milan as part of the old parish of Cannobio. As part of the diocese of Milan, the Ambrosian Rite was followed in the church. The Church of SS Pietro e Paolo is first mentioned in the 13th century. It was parish church in 1335 and in 1865 it was awarded the title of a priory church. The existing building is from the 16th to the 17th century, and it was restored in 1961. The island of Sant'Apollinare was under the Ambrosian Rite, while on the Isola Grande (Church of S. Pancrazio), which belonged to the parish church of Locarno and the territory of Ascona, the Roman Rite was followed. On this island in the 13th century, the Humiliati order founded a monastery. After the order was suppressed in 1571, their property was given to the hospital in Locarno. In 1885, the Baroness Antonietta Saint-Léger acquired the two islands and built a botanical garden and villa on Isola Grande. The villa turned into a cultural meeting place. In 1927, the ownership passed to Max Emden from Hamburg, who built a new palace. In 1949 the islands were acquired under joint ownership: the canton of Ticino, the municipalities of Brissago, Ascona and Ronco sopra Ascona, the Swiss Heritage Society and the Swiss Federation for Nature Conservation. Since 1950, the botanical garden on Isola Grande has been a public garden.

In the Middle Ages, the majority of the population worked in agriculture and animal husbandry. The shoreline and hill dwellers operated some fishing boats and some commerce and trade. Already in the 13th century there were mills, hammer mills and sawmills, as well as later lime kilns in the village. Starting in the 15th century, much of the population emigrated to Milan and Tuscany. The later immigrants from Brissago were traditionally cooks and hoteliers. In the 18th century some families moved to Locarno and Ascona, where they gained a certain reputation. The opening of a spinning mill in 1854, which became two years later a tobacco factory, gradually changed the socio-economic structure of the municipality. In 1888 a new factory was built, and, in the first decades of the 20th century, industrial activity reached its peak, with more than 600 people, mostly women, employed in tobacco processing. During this time, the municipality also began to develop into a resort town with many second homes and hotels. This change accelerated in 1907 with the construction of the Grande Albergo hotel, which was demolished in 1993. After 1970, the services sector was the most important part of the local economy. The growth in the 1960s and 1970s led the town to grow up the hillsides and become a contiguous residential area.

Aerial view (1946)

== Geography ==
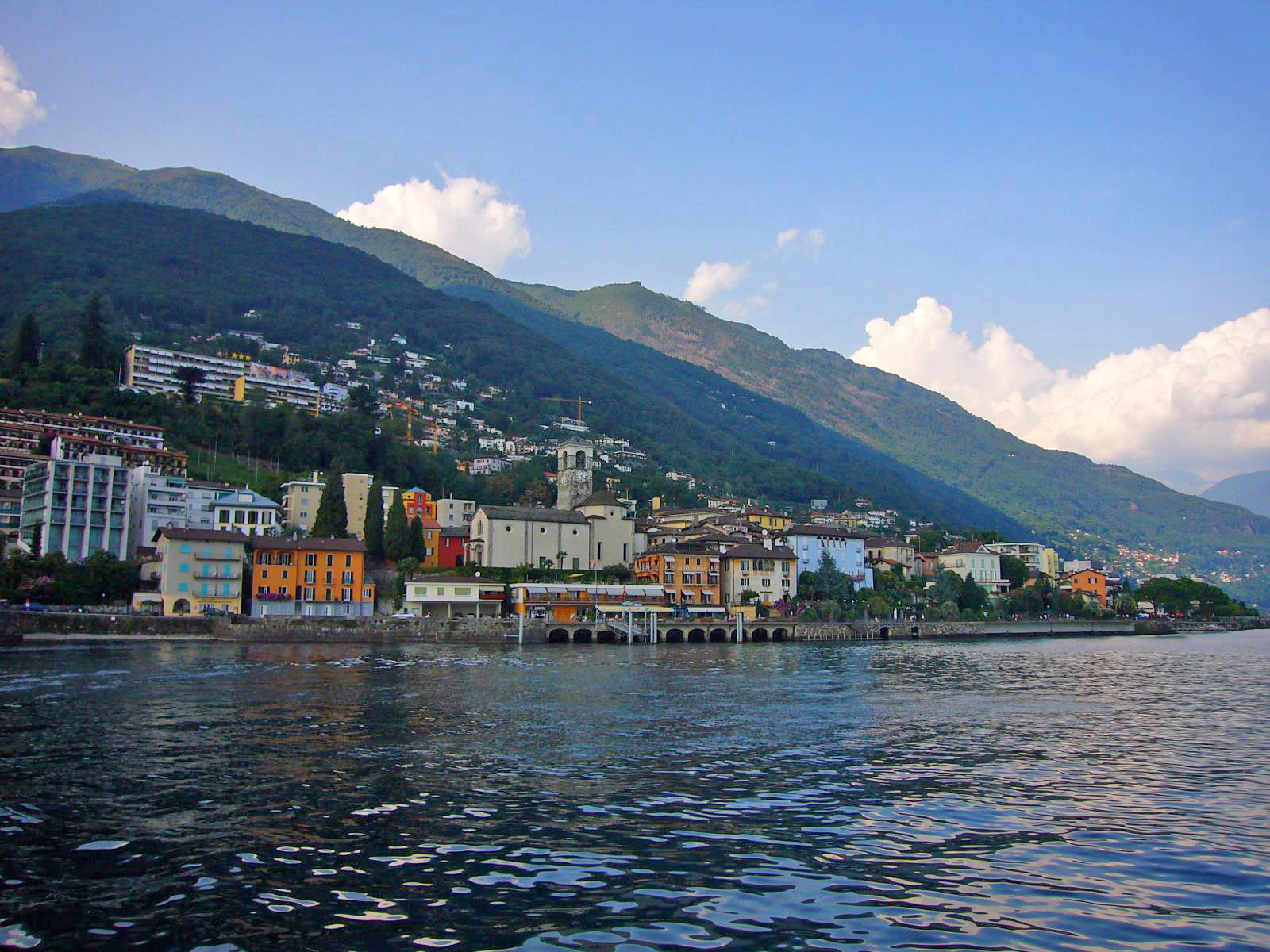
Brissago from Lake Maggiore

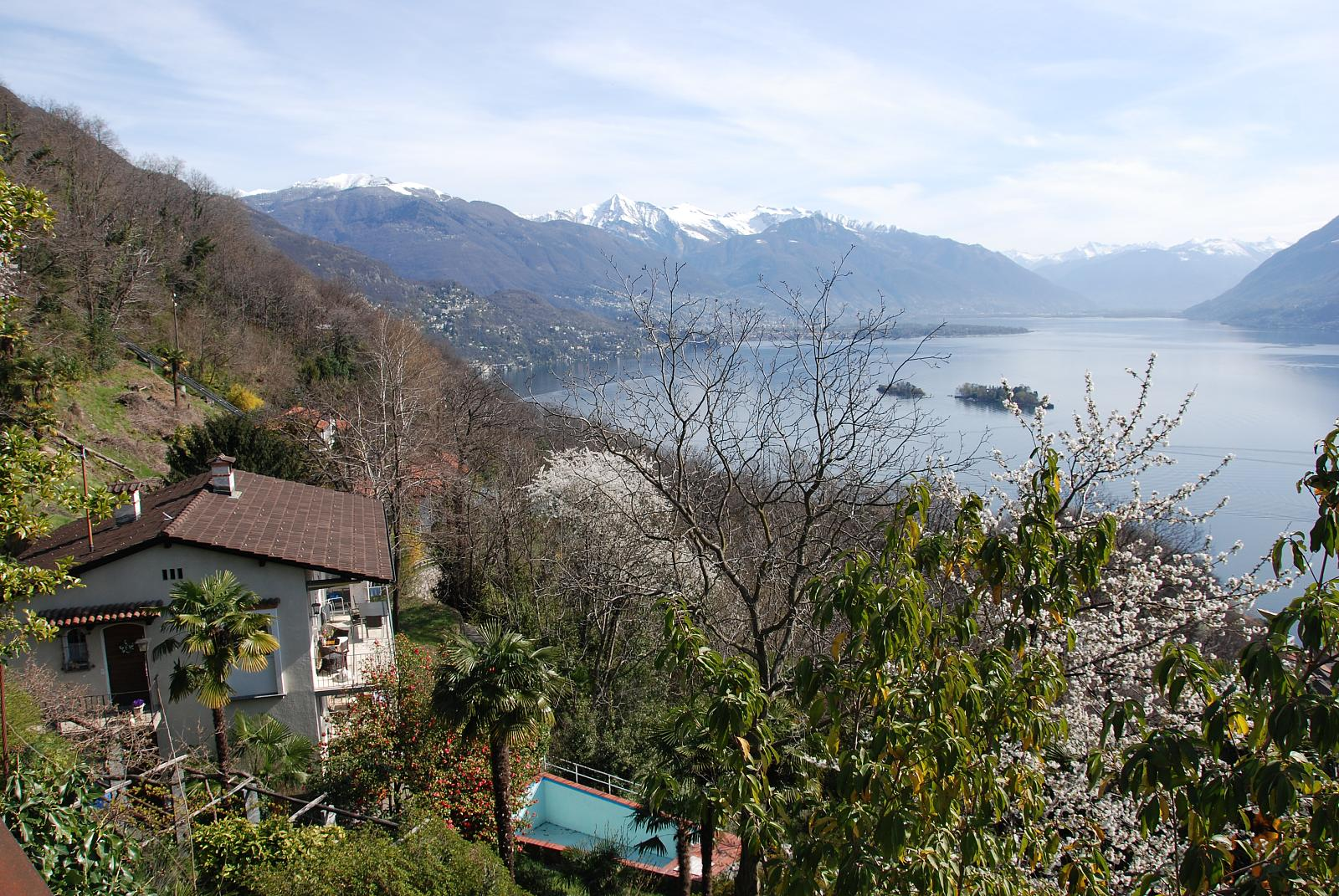
Lake Maggiore from the Porta section of Brissago

Brissago has an area, as of 1997, of 17.79 square kilometers (6.87 sq mi). Of this area, 1.25 km^{2} (0.48 sq mi) or 7.0% is used for agricultural purposes, while 11.84 km^{2} (4.57 sq mi) or 66.6% is forested. Of the rest of the land, 1.24 km^{2} (0.48 sq mi) or 7.0% is settled (buildings or roads), 0.32 km^{2} (0.12 sq mi) or 1.8% is either rivers or lakes and 3.42 km^{2} (1.32 sq mi) or 19.2% is unproductive land.

Of the built up area, housing and buildings made up 5.3% and transportation infrastructure made up 1.2%. Out of the forested land, 51.9% of the total land area is heavily forested, while 12.4% is covered in small trees and shrubbery and 2.2% is covered with orchards or small clusters of trees. Of the agricultural land, 1.5% is used for growing crops and 5.3% is used for alpine pastures. Of the water in the municipality, 0.4% is in lakes and 1.4% is in rivers and streams. Of the unproductive areas, 15.3% is unproductive vegetation and 3.9% is too rocky for vegetation.

The municipality is located in the Locarno district, on the shores of Lake Maggiore. It is bordered by the Valmara and Valle di Creda and consists of three mountainous shoreline sections. The three sections are divided by the Valli di Ponte and the Sacro Monte. It lies on the road to Ascona along the Italian border. It consists of the village of Brissago and the sections of Caccio, Cadogno, Cartogna, Gadero, Incella, Madonna di Ponte, Nevedone, Noveledo, Piazza, Piodina, Porta, Rossorino, Tecetto and the two islands Isola Grande and Sant'Apollinare. The 13 sections are scattered in the hills on roads leading to Mount Gridone (2,188 m (7,178 ft)). On the other side of Mount Gridone is the Centovalli.

== Transportation ==
Regular boat service and hydrofoil service runs from Locarno to Brissago via Ascona and the Isole di Brissago (Brissago Islands) on which there is a botanical reserve with coffee plants and peacocks taking advantage of the odd sub-tropical zone.

== Coat of arms ==
The blazon of the municipal coat of arms is Argent a cross gules and in canton St. George riding a horse toward sinister argent cloaked gules killing a dragon vert. St. George refers to 24 April 1520 (St. George's day) when Brissago decided to be put under the protection of the Swiss.

== Demographics ==
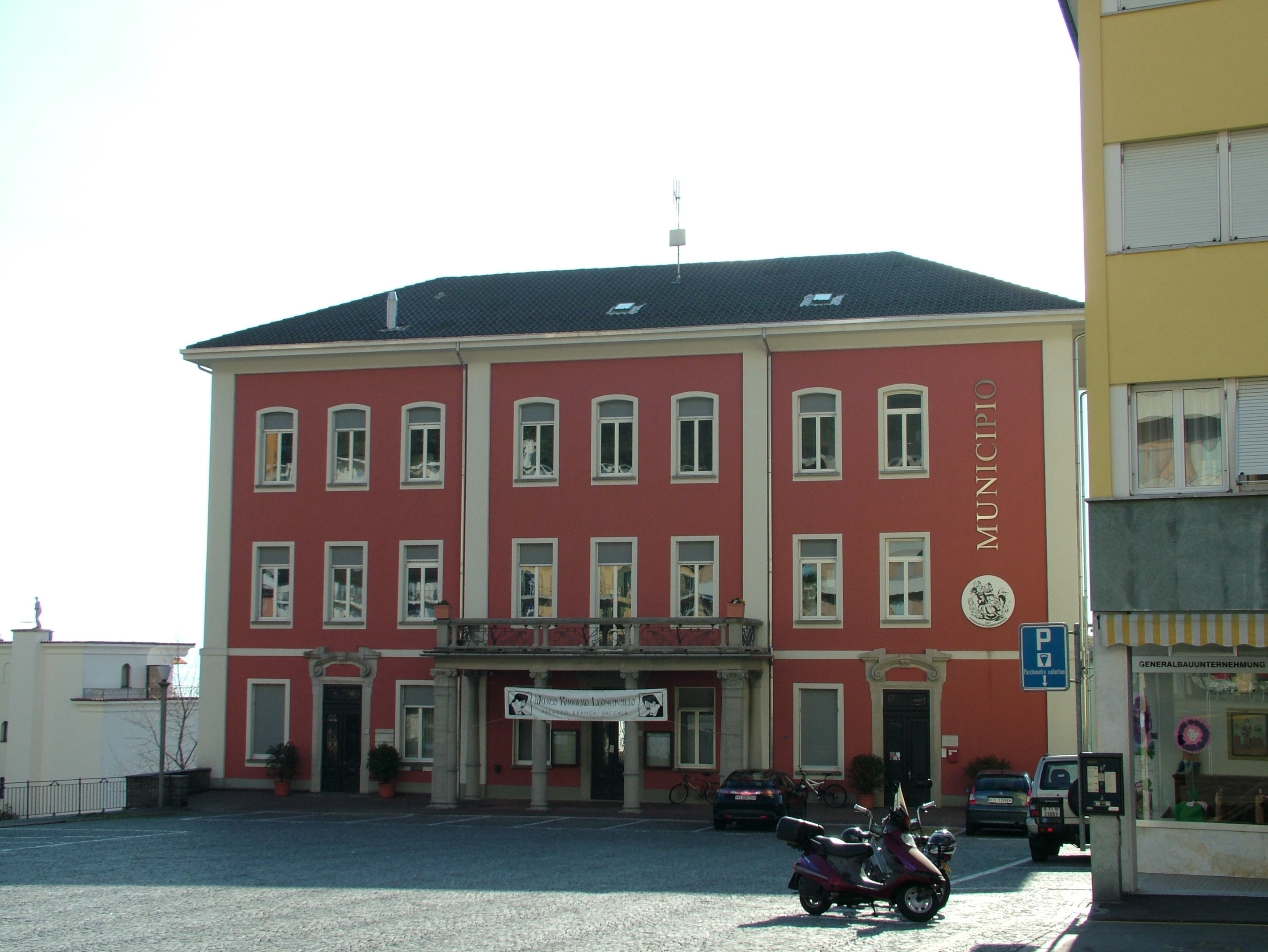
Municipal administration building

Brissago has a population (as of December 2020) of 1,685. As of 2008, 18.3% of the population are resident foreign nationals. Over the last 10 years (1997–2007) the population has changed at a rate of 2.6%.

Most of the population (as of 2000) speaks Italian (69.1%), with German being second most common (24.9%) and French being third (1.3%). Of the Swiss national languages (as of 2000), 456 speak German, 23 people speak French, 1,267 people speak Italian, and 5 people speak Romansh. The remainder (82 people) speak another language.

As of 2008, the gender distribution of the population was 48.1% male and 51.9% female. The population was made up of 710 Swiss men (38.4% of the population), and 178 (9.6%) non-Swiss men. There were 800 Swiss women (43.3%), and 159 (8.6%) non-Swiss women.

In 2008 there were 11 live births to Swiss citizens and 3 births to non-Swiss citizens, and in same time span there were 22 deaths of Swiss citizens and 4 non-Swiss citizen deaths. Ignoring immigration and emigration, the population of Swiss citizens decreased by 11 while the foreign population decreased by 1. There were 8 Swiss men and 2 Swiss women who emigrated from Switzerland. At the same time, there were 13 non-Swiss men and 2 non-Swiss women who immigrated from another country to Switzerland. The total Swiss population change in 2008 (from all sources) was a decrease of 32 and the non-Swiss population change was a decrease of 2 people. This represents a population growth rate of -1.8%.

The age distribution, as of 2009, in Brissago is; 107 children or 5.8% of the population are between 0 and 9 years old and 130 teenagers or 7.0% are between 10 and 19. Of the adult population, 128 people or 6.9% of the population are between 20 and 29 years old. 178 people or 9.6% are between 30 and 39, 285 people or 15.4% are between 40 and 49, and 275 people or 14.9% are between 50 and 59. The senior population distribution is 353 people or 19.1% of the population are between 60 and 69 years old, 223 people or 12.1% are between 70 and 79, there are 168 people or 9.1% who are over 80.

As of 2000, there were 862 private households in the municipality, and an average of 1.9 persons per household. In 2000 there were 831 single family homes (or 67.0% of the total) out of a total of 1,241 inhabited buildings. There were 212 two family buildings (17.1%) and 138 multi-family buildings (11.1%). There were also 60 buildings in the municipality that were multipurpose buildings (used for both housing and commercial or another purpose).

The vacancy rate for the municipality, in 2008, was 0.47%. In 2000 there were 2,420 apartments in the municipality. The most common apartment size was the 3 room apartment of which there were 771. There were 170 single room apartments and 336 apartments with five or more rooms. Of these apartments, a total of 853 apartments (35.2% of the total) were permanently occupied, while 1,547 apartments (63.9%) were seasonally occupied and 20 apartments (0.8%) were empty. As of 2007, the construction rate of new housing units was 15.3 new units per 1000 residents.

The historical population is given in the following table:

year	population
1578	1,675
1801	1,330
1850	1,266
1860	1,136
1900	1,639
1930	1,577
1950	1,931
1970	2,120
1990	1,909
2000	1,833

== Heritage sites of national significance ==
The Ruggero Leoncavallo Museum, the churches of Madonna del Ponte and Santuario di S. Maria Addolorata del Sacro Monte and the botanical garden and cult site on Isole di Brissago are listed as Swiss heritage site of national significance. The entire Isole di Brissago is part of the Inventory of Swiss Heritage Sites.

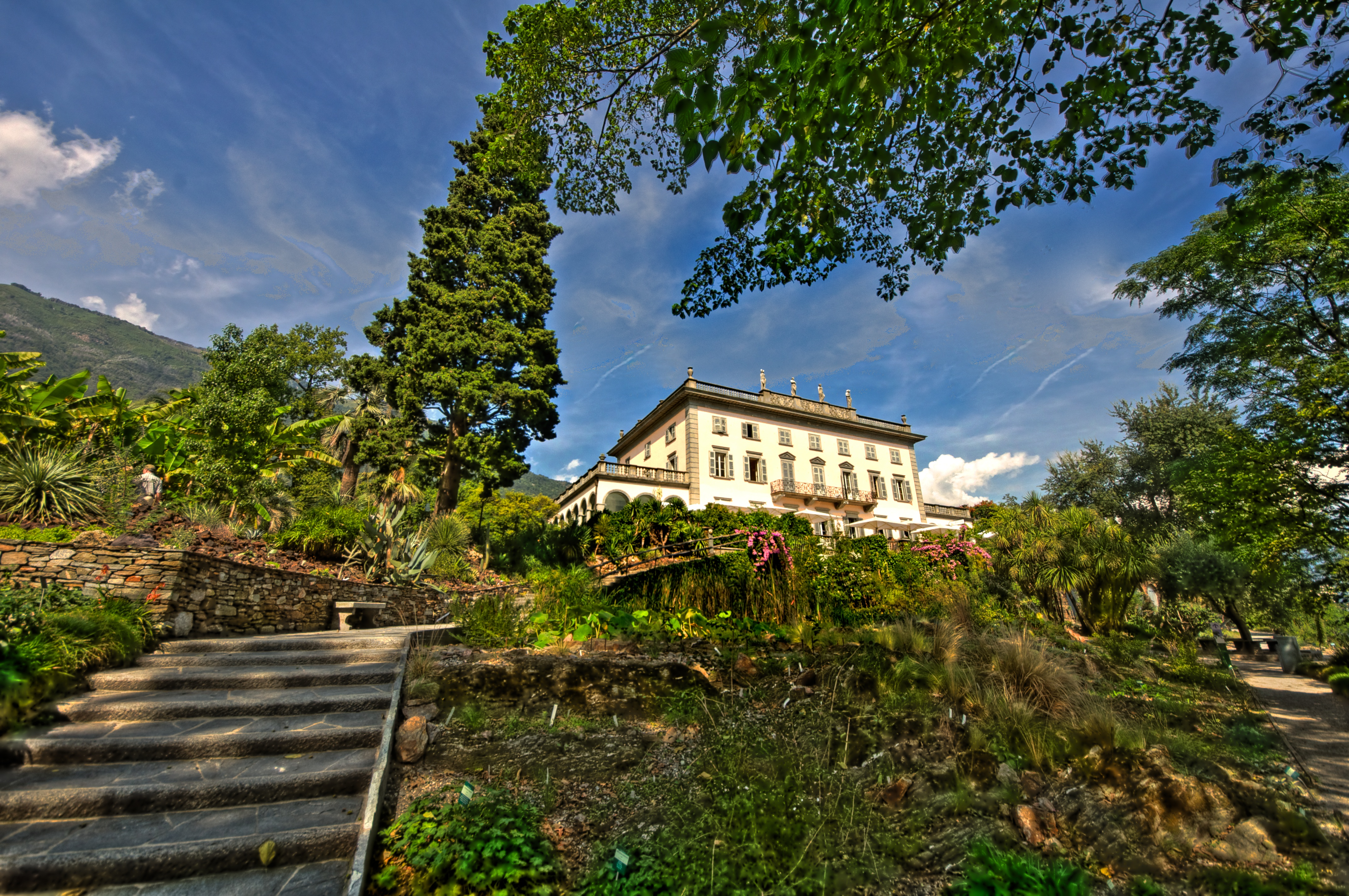
Isole di Brissago botanical gardens

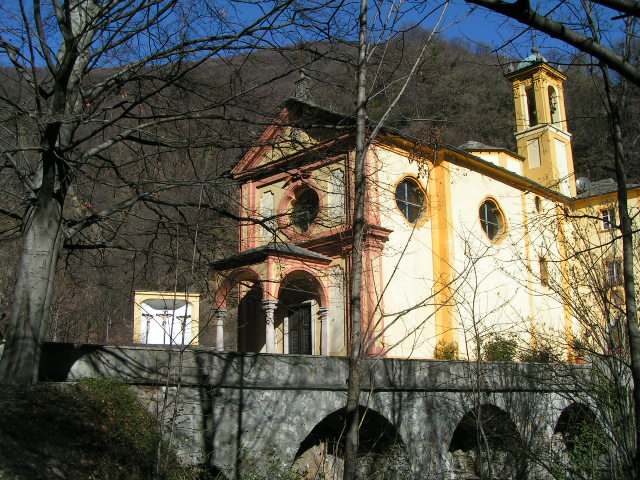
Church S. Maria Addolorata del Sacro Monte

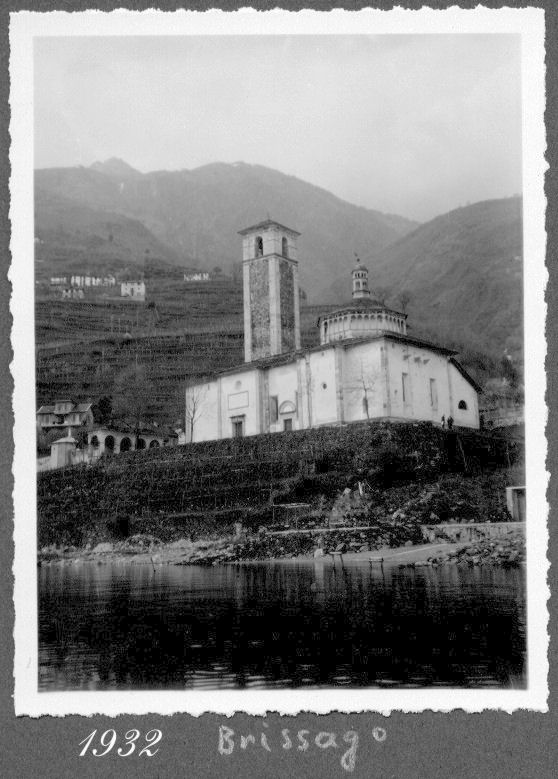
Church of Madonna del Ponte in 1932

== Politics ==
In the 2007 federal election the most popular party was the FDP which received 37.14% of the vote. The next three most popular parties were the SP (23.44%), the CVP (12.44%) and the SVP (10.85%). In the federal election, a total of 602 votes were cast, and the voter turnout was 42.5%.

In the 2007 Gran Consiglio election, there were a total of 1,407 registered voters in Brissago, of which 715 or 50.8% voted. 13 blank ballots and 1 null ballot were cast, leaving 701 valid ballots in the election. The most popular party was the PLRT which received 238 or 34.0% of the vote. The next three most popular parties were; the PS (with 181 or 25.8%), the SSI (with 79 or 11.3%) and the LEGA (with 70 or 10.0%).

In the 2007 Consiglio di Stato election, 9 blank ballots were cast, leaving 707 valid ballots in the election. The most popular party was the PLRT which received 218 or 30.8% of the vote. The next three most popular parties were; the PS (with 201 or 28.4%), the LEGA (with 102 or 14.4%) and the SSI (with 77 or 10.9%).

== Economy ==
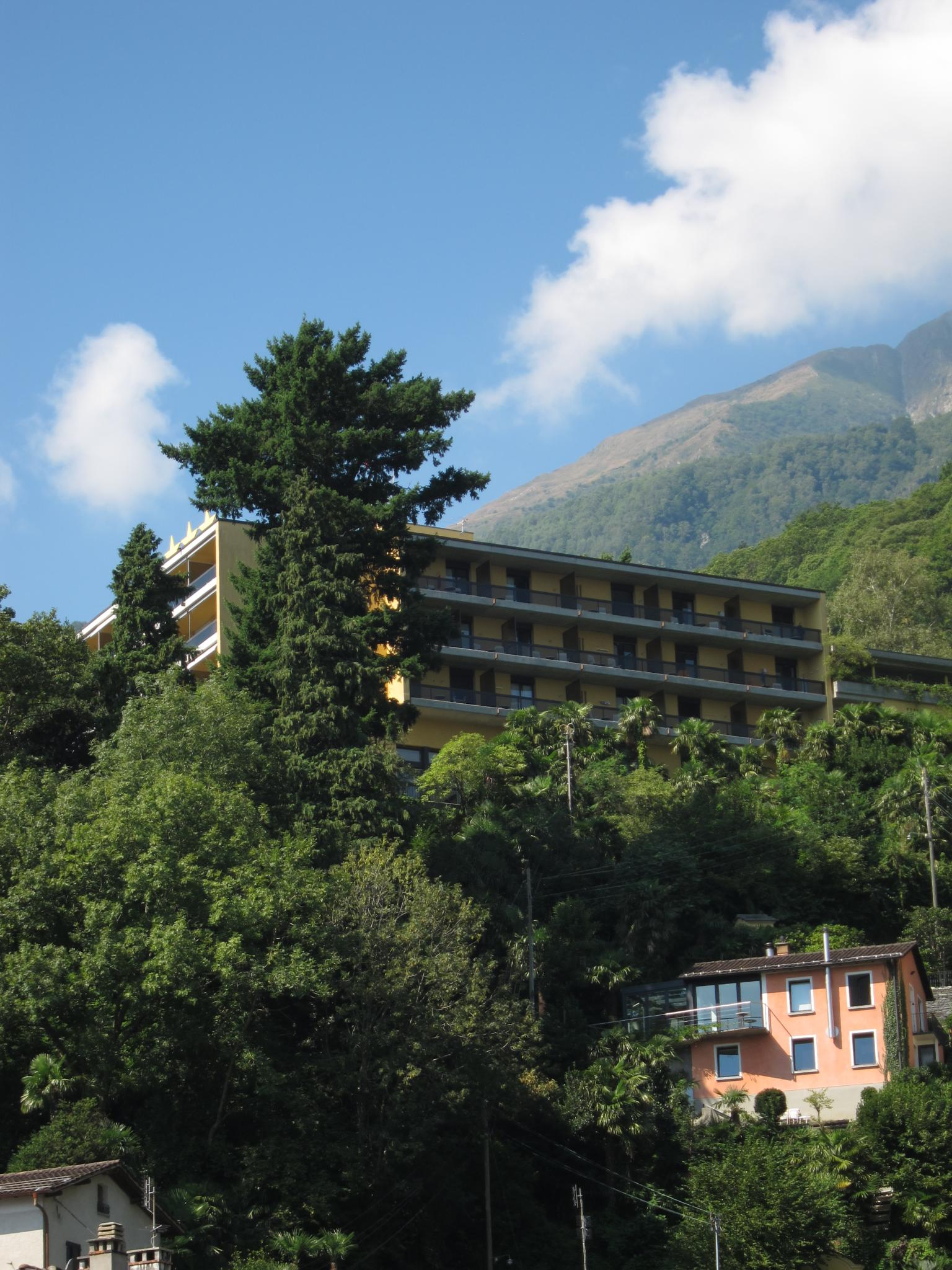
A hotel in Brissago

As of 2007, Brissago had an unemployment rate of 3.39%. As of 2005, there were 38 people employed in the primary economic sector and about 10 businesses involved in this sector. 215 people were employed in the secondary sector and there were 20 businesses in this sector. 879 people were employed in the tertiary sector, with 107 businesses in this sector. There were 777 residents of the municipality who were employed in some capacity, of which females made up 42.6% of the workforce.

In 2000, there were 1,054 workers who commuted into the municipality and 284 workers who commuted away. The municipality is a net importer of workers, with about 3.7 workers entering the municipality for every one leaving. About 34.2% of the workforce coming into Brissago are coming from outside Switzerland. Of the working population, 5.5% used public transportation to get to work, and 53.5% used a private car.

As of 2009, there were 10 hotels in Brissago with a total of 225 rooms and 436 beds.

== Religion ==
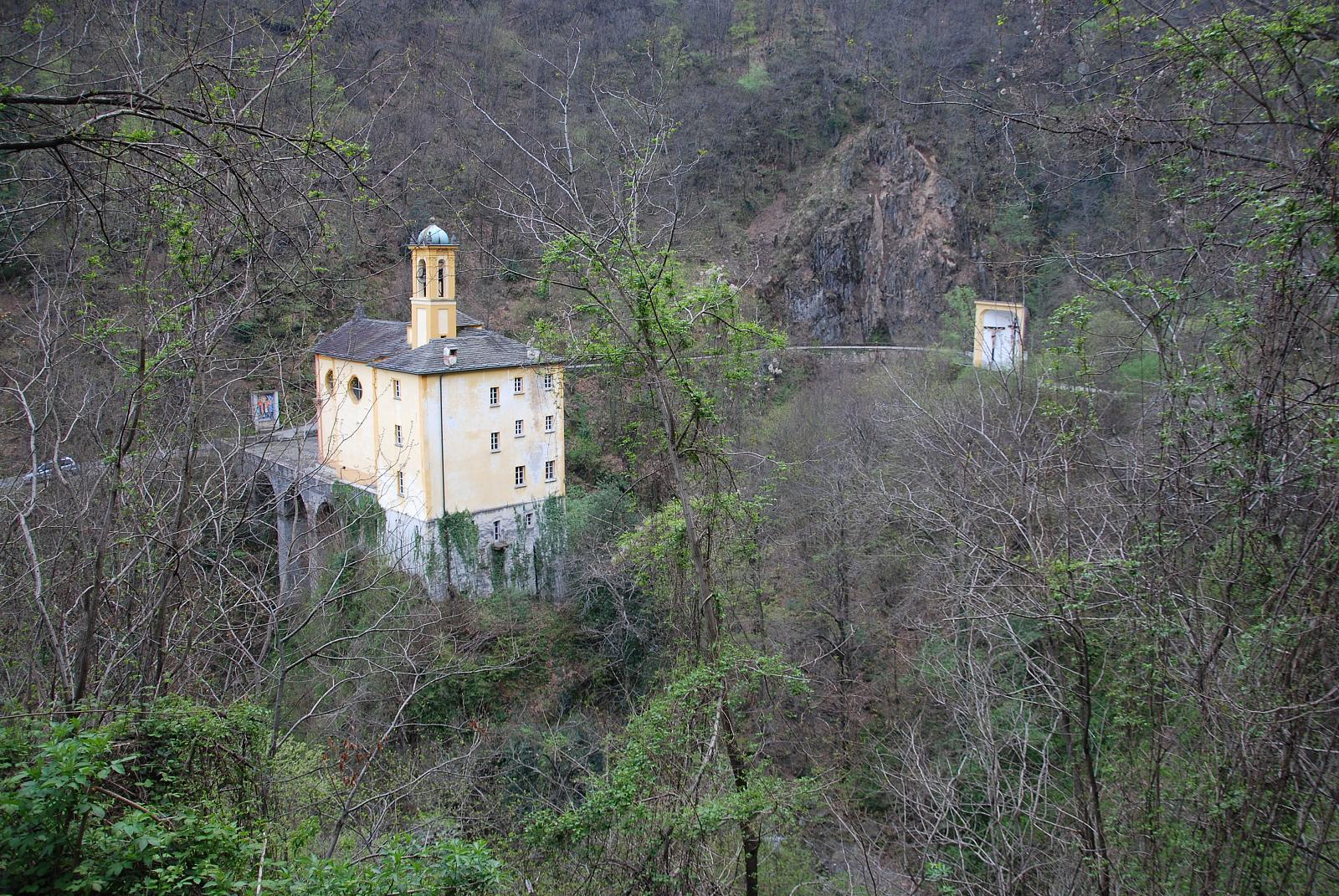
Church of S. Maria Addolorata del Sacro Monte in Brissago

From the 2000 census, 1,316 or 71.8% were Roman Catholic, while 260 or 14.2% belonged to the Swiss Reformed Church. There are 191 individuals (or about 10.42% of the population) who belong to another church (not listed on the census), and 66 individuals (or about 3.60% of the population) did not answer the question.

== Climate ==
Brissago has an average of 99.1 days of rain or snow per year and on average receives 2,019 mm (79.5 in) of precipitation. The wettest month is September during which time Brissago receives an average of 241 mm (9.5 in) of rain. During this month there is precipitation for an average of 7.8 days. The month with the most days of precipitation is May, with an average of 12.3, but with only 222 mm (8.7 in) of rain or snow. The driest month of the year is December with an average of 73 mm (2.9 in) of precipitation over 5.6 days.

== Education ==
The entire Swiss population is generally well educated. In Brissago about 67.5% of the population (between age 25–64) have completed either non-mandatory upper secondary education or additional higher education (either university or a Fachhochschule).

In Brissago there were a total of 204 students (as of 2009). The Ticino education system provides up to three years of non-mandatory kindergarten and in Brissago there were 29 children in kindergarten. The primary school program lasts for five years and includes both a standard school and a special school. In the municipality, 56 students attended the standard primary schools and 5 students attended the special school. In the lower secondary school system, students either attend a two-year middle school followed by a two-year pre-apprenticeship or they attend a four-year program to prepare for higher education. There were 51 students in the two-year middle school and 1 in their pre-apprenticeship, while 23 students were in the four-year advanced program.

The upper secondary school includes several options, but at the end of the upper secondary program, a student will be prepared to enter a trade or to continue on to a university or college. In Ticino, vocational students may either attend school while working on their internship or apprenticeship (which takes three or four years) or may attend school followed by an internship or apprenticeship (which takes one year as a full-time student or one and a half to two years as a part-time student). There were 11 vocational students who were attending school full-time and 25 who attend part-time.

The professional program lasts three years and prepares a student for a job in engineering, nursing, computer science, business, tourism and similar fields. There were 3 students in the professional program.

As of 2000, there were 56 students in Brissago who came from another municipality, while 127 residents attended schools outside the municipality.

== Crime ==
In 2014 the crime rate, of the over 200 crimes listed in the Swiss Criminal Code (running from murder, robbery and assault to accepting bribes and election fraud), in Brissago was 33.3 per thousand residents. This rate is lower than average, at only 61.9% of the rate in the district, 60.8% of the cantonal rate and 51.5% of the average rate in the entire country. During the same period, the rate of drug crimes was 1.7 per thousand residents. This rate is lower than average, at only 14.9% of the rate in the district, 19.3% of the rate in the canton and 17.2% of the national rate. The rate of violations of immigration, visa and work permit laws was 6.7 per thousand residents. This rate is 204.5% greater than the rate in the district and 86.1% greater than the rate in the canton.

== In popular culture ==
- Brissago is the location of a summit for global nuclear disarmament in H. G. Wells' Utopian novel The World Set Free, a pivotal moment in the novel.

== Notable people ==
- Nella Martinetti (1946-2011), Swiss singer-songwriter
