= Valle Cannobina =

- Comune
- Comune di Valle Cannobina
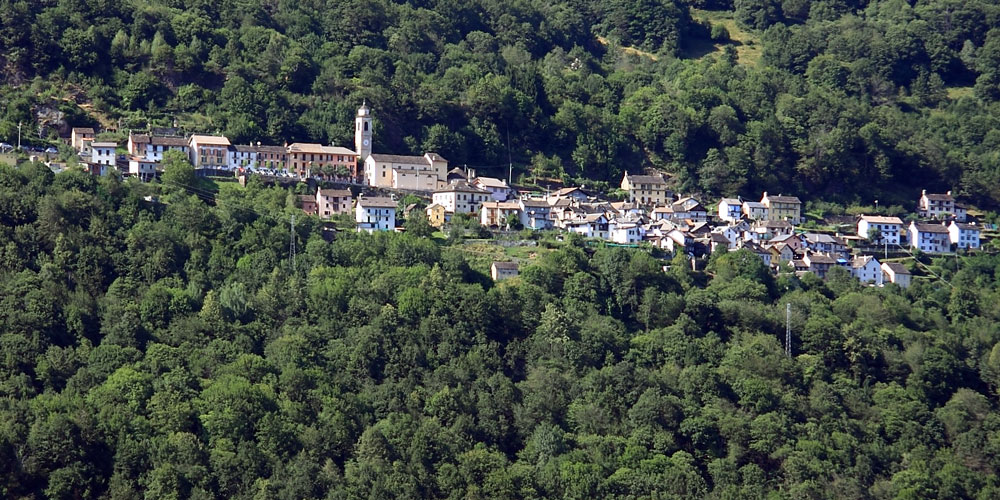
- Cursolo

- Location within Italy Location within Piedmont
- Coordinates: 46°4′9″N 8°36′30″E
- Country: Italy
- Region: Piedmont
- Province: Province of Verbano-Cusio-Ossola (VB)
- Founded: 1 January 2019
- Frazioni: Cavaglio, Crealla, Cursolo, Falmenta, Gurrone, Lunecco (Town Hall), Orasso, Spoccia

Government
  - Mayor: Luigi Milani

Area
  - Total: 55.17 km^{2} (21.30 sq mi)
- Elevation: 415 m (1,362 ft)

Population (30-11-2018)
  - Total: 490
  - Density: 8.9/km^{2} (23/sq mi)
- Time zone: UTC+1 (CET)
  - Summer (DST): UTC+2 (CEST)
- Postal code: 28825 (ex Cavaglio-Spoccia), 28827 (ex Cursolo-Orasso and Falmenta)
- Dialing code: 0323

Valle Cannobina is a comune (municipality) in the Province of Verbano-Cusio-Ossola in the Italian region Piedmont, located about 140 kilometres (87 mi) northeast of Turin and about 20 kilometres (12 mi) northeast of Verbania, on the border with Switzerland. As of 30 November 2018, it had a population of 490 and an area of 55.17 square kilometres (21.30 mi^{2}).

It was established on 1 January 2019 by the merger of the municipalities of Cavaglio-Spoccia, Cursolo-Orasso and Falmenta.

Valle Cannobina borders the following municipalities: Aurano, Brissago (Switzerland), Cannobio, Centovalli (Switzerland), Cossogno, Gurro, Malesco, Miazzina, Re, Trarego Viggiona.

== Geography ==
Valle Cannobina includes the inhabited centers of Cavaglio San Donnino, Crealla, Cursolo, Falmenta, Gurrone, Lunecco (municipal seat), Orasso, Spoccia.
