= Palagnedra =

- Former municipality
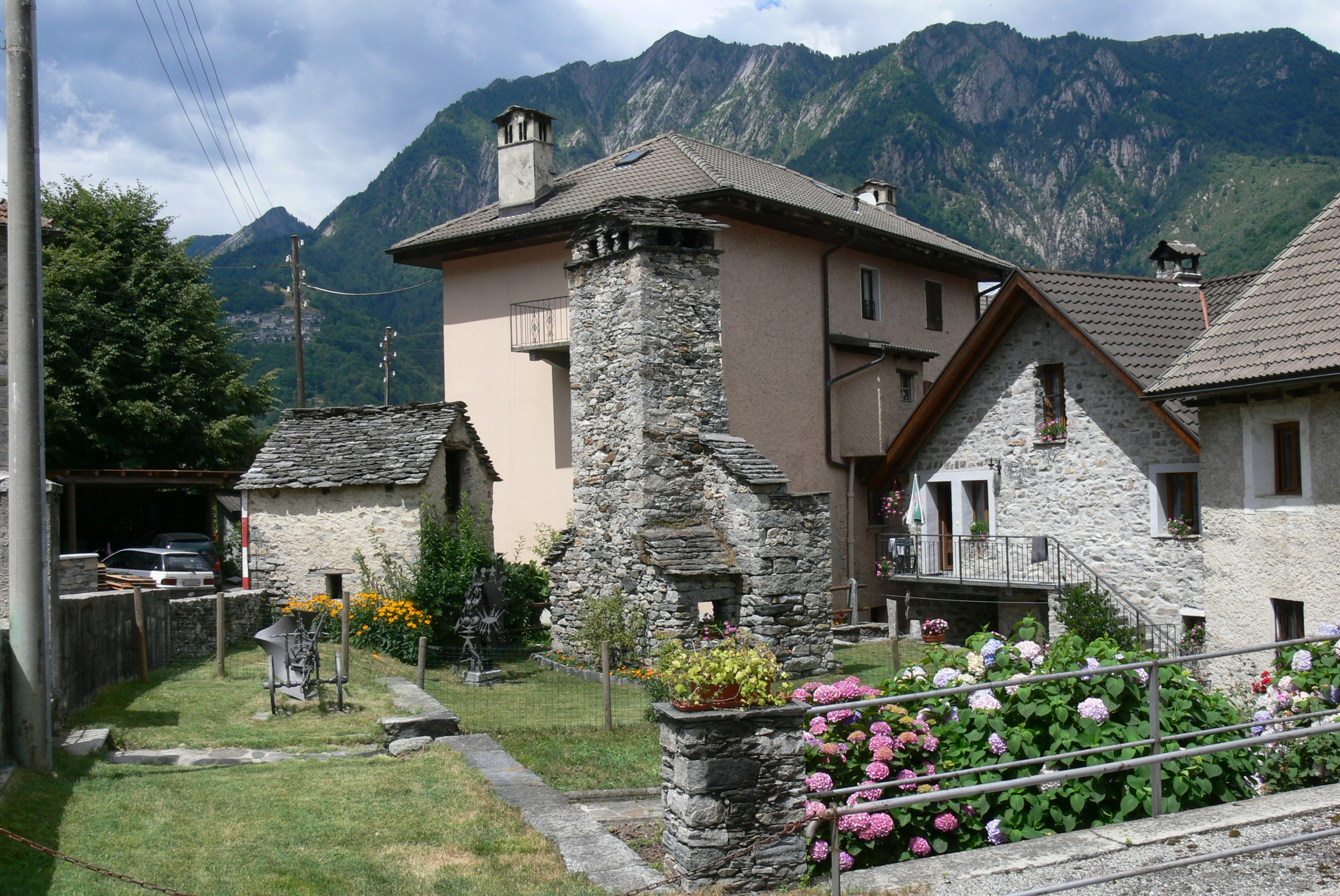
- Palagnedra village

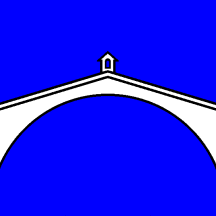
- Flag Coat of arms
- Location of Palagnedra
- Location within Switzerland Location within Canton of Ticino
- Coordinates: 46°09′N 8°38′E
- Country: Switzerland
- Canton: Ticino
- District: Locarno

Area
  - Total: 16.38 km^{2} (6.32 sq mi)
- Elevation: 652 m (2,139 ft)

Population (December 2004)
  - Total: 119
  - Density: 7.26/km^{2} (18.8/sq mi)
- Time zone: UTC+01:00 (CET)
  - Summer (DST): UTC+02:00 (CEST)
- Postal code: 6657
- SFOS number: 5122
- ISO 3166 code: CH-TI
- Surrounded by: Brissago, Cannobio (IT-VB), Valle Cannobina (IT-VB), Intragna, Re (IT-VB)
- Website: SFSO statistics

Palagnedra is a village and a locality part of the municipality of Centovalli in the district of Locarno in the canton of Ticino in Switzerland. Lago di Palagnedra is located below the village, on the Melezza river.

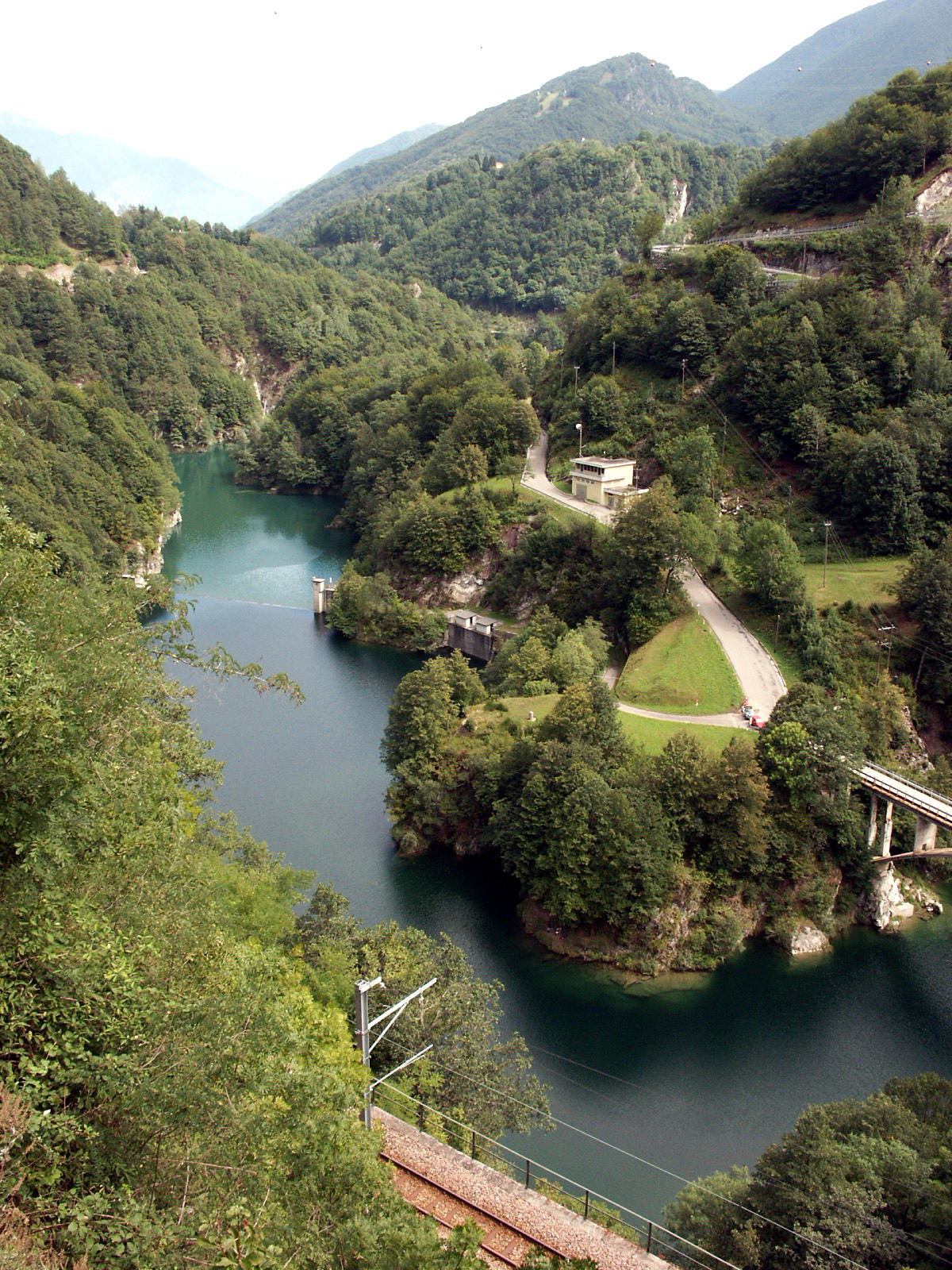
Lago di Palagnedra

== History ==
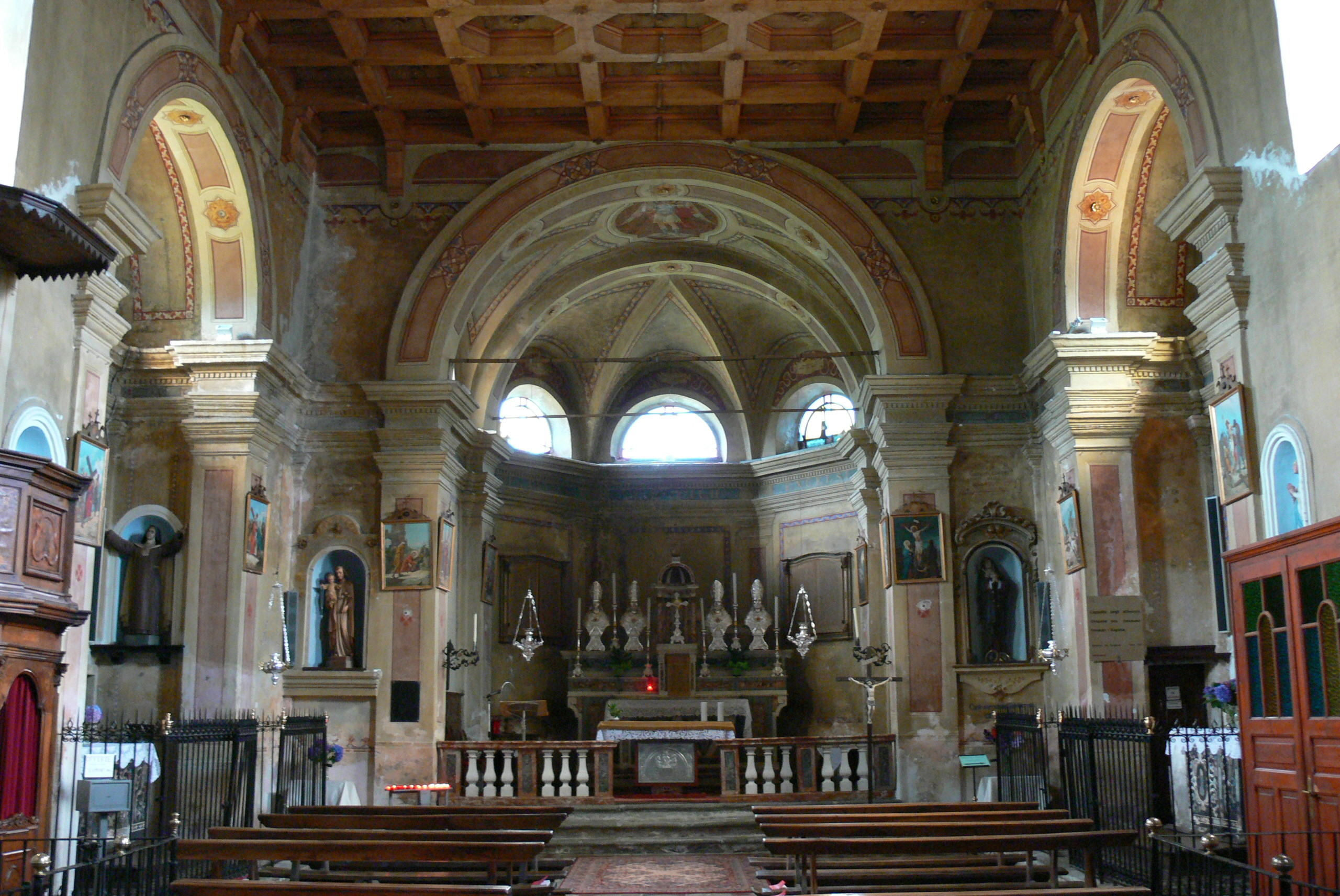
Interior of San Michele

Palagnedra is first mentioned in 1379 as Pallagnidrio.

During the Middle Ages, Palagnedra was the administrative and religious center in the 13th-century Centovalli valley community. In the 16th century it became part of the Locarno and Ascona region, followed by the bailiwick of Locarno. In 1864 the village became independent.

The church of San Michele was built between 1640-1732 and renovated in 1964-66 and again between 1999 and 2001. It was the mother church of the Centovalli valley and contains the best preserved late gothic cycle of frescoes by Antonio da Tradate.

Traditionally the local economy was based around agriculture and grazing. Starting in the 16th century some of the income came from the seasonal migration to Italy. Initially, most of the seasonal workers were laborers. This changed in the 19th century to cooks going to Tuscany. Until the 1950s, the vicinity of the Italian Swiss border encouraged smuggling. In 1950-52 a hydroelectric dam was built. In 2005 about a third of the jobs in Palagnedra related to the agricultural sector.

On 25 October 2009 the municipalities of Borgnone, Intragna and Palagnedra merged into the municipality of Centovalli.

A large part of the community of Palagnedra is formed by the notorious family name "Mazzi"

== Location ==
Aerial view (1953)

The former municipality is located in the Locarno district on a terrace on the southern slope of the Centovalli. It includes various districts, including Bordei, Bolade and Crup.

== Historic population ==
The historical population is given in the following table:

Year	Population Palagnedra
1850	337
1900	267
1950	298
2000	92
