= Borgnone =

- Municipality
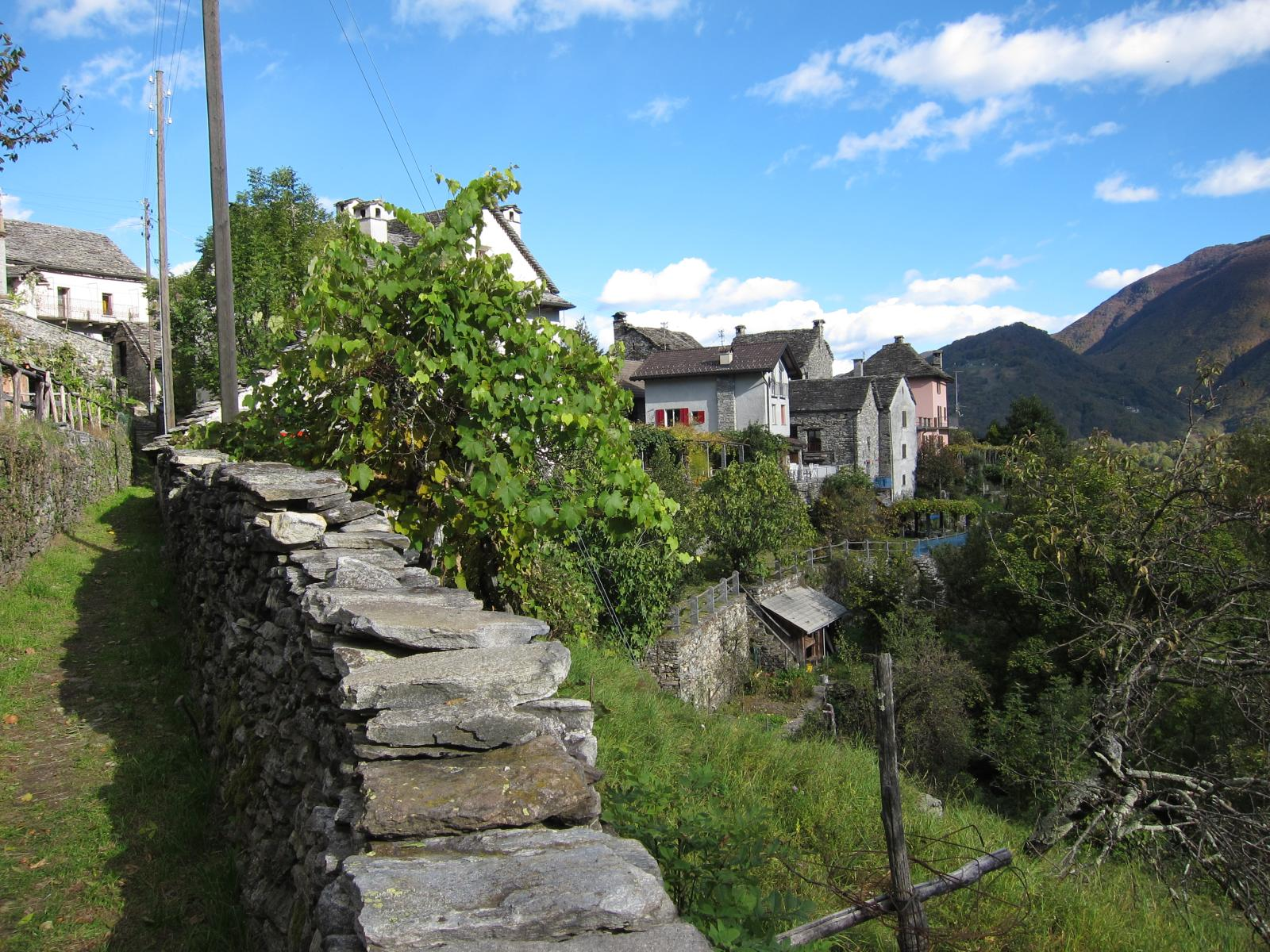
- Borgnone hamlet

- Flag Coat of arms
- Location of Borgnone
- Location within Switzerland Location within Canton of Ticino
- Coordinates: 46°09′34.9″N 8°36′58.7″E
- Country: Switzerland
- Canton: Ticino
- District: Locarno

Area
  - Total: 10.6 km^{2} (4.1 sq mi)
- Elevation: 713 m (2,339 ft)
- Time zone: UTC+01:00 (CET)
  - Summer (DST): UTC+02:00 (CEST)
- Postal code: 6658
- SFOS number: 5094
- ISO 3166 code: CH-TI
- Website: website missing SFSO statistics

Borgnone is a hamlet part of the municipality of Centovalli in the district of Locarno in the canton of Ticino in Switzerland.

== History ==
Aerial view (1953)

Borgnone is first mentioned in 1364 as Brugnono. In the Middle Ages it was part of the Locarno region. In the 15th century, it became a Degagna, which was part of the bailiwick of Locarno between the 16th century and 1798. It then became an independent political municipality when the municipality of Centovalli was split in 1838.

It belonged to the parish of Palagnedra and in 1630 became a vice-parish. The Church of Beata Vergine dell 'Assunta (built 1364–65) underwent several transformations.

A strong seasonal emigration supplemented the income from agriculture and animal husbandry of the residents. The majority of the population (1990: 70%) is in the services sector, and half of all residences are second or vacation homes. In 1923 the Locarno-Domodossola rail line was completed.

On 25 October 2009 the former municipalities of Borgnone, Intragna and Palagnedra merged into the municipality of Centovalli.

== Location ==
Borgnone is located in the Locarno district, on the northern slope of the Centovalli at an elevation of 713 m (2,339 ft). It is about 200 m (660 ft) above the valley floor. It is located on the border with Italy. It limits to the North with the Swiss localities of Spruga, Comologno, Crana and Mosogno, to the East with the Swiss locality of Verdasio, to the South with the Swiss localities of Palagnedra, Moneto and Camedo and to the West with Italy. Borgnone's exact location.

== Transportation ==
The railway station of Borgnone-Cadanza closed in 2023. The nearest station is Palagnedra on the Domodossola–Locarno railway line.
