= Intragna =

- Former municipality
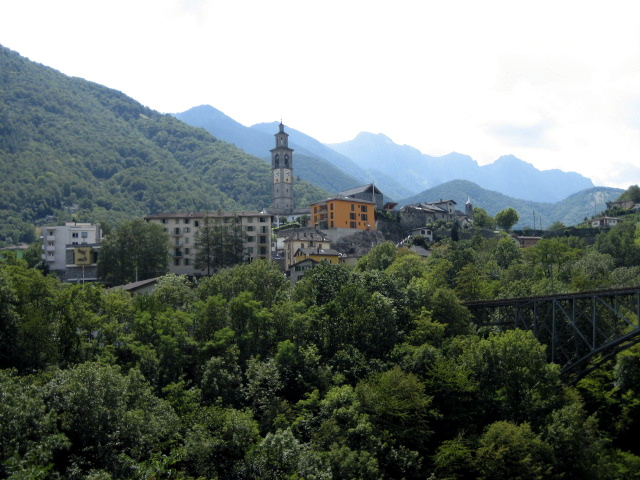
- View from the surrounding mountains

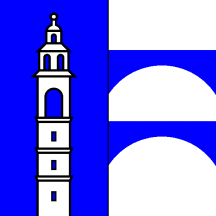
- Flag Coat of arms
- Location of Intragna
- Location within Switzerland Location within Canton of Ticino
- Coordinates: 46°11′N 8°42′E
- Country: Switzerland
- Canton: Ticino
- District: Locarno

Area
  - Total: 24.1 km^{2} (9.3 sq mi)
- Elevation: 366 m (1,201 ft)

Population (December 2004)
  - Total: 885
  - Density: 36.7/km^{2} (95.1/sq mi)
- Time zone: UTC+01:00 (CET)
  - Summer (DST): UTC+02:00 (CEST)
- Postal code: 6655
- SFOS number: 5111
- ISO 3166 code: CH-TI
- Surrounded by: Ascona, Borgnone, Brissago, Cavigliano, Isorno, Losone, Mosogno, Palagnedra
- Website: SFSO statistics

Intragna is a village and locality in the municipality of Centovalli in the district of Locarno of the canton of Ticino in Switzerland.

Intragna has a railway connection with Locarno, Switzerland and Domodossola, Italy, as well as bus connections that lead to various hiking routes.

Intragna is an old town with ancient-style buildings and small narrow streets. It has artist workshops selling handmade lacework and ceramics, as well as several hotels. The church tower of Intragna is claimed to be the highest tower in Ticino.

== History ==
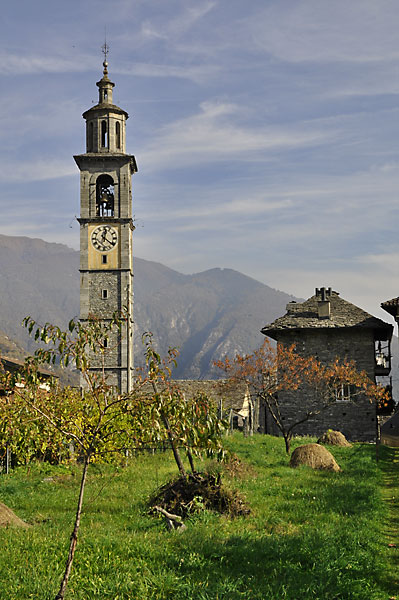
Bell tower of S. Nome di Maria, the tallest in Ticino

Aerial view (1964)

In 1897, several pre-Roman graves were discovered, which show the colonization of the area before the 1st millennium BC. The modern village of Intragna is first mentioned in 1272 as Intranea.

During the Middle Ages the landlords over the village included both the Bishop of Como and the Capitanei (noble families) of Locarno. Together with Golino and Verdasio, Intragna was part of a Vicinanza. The first statutes of the Vicinanza were written in 1365 and were revised in 1469. They possessed the right to appoint one representative to the Council of the parish of Locarno. The mayor (or console) was alternately appointed during five years by Intragna, then by one provided by Golino and Verdasio. During the 16th to 18th centuries it was part of the bailiwick of Locarno. In 1531, the Swiss Confederation rejected an application from Intragna, Ascona, Onsernone and Centovalli to form a municipality that was independent of Locarno. Likewise, the conflict-ridden attempts of Golino to form an independent municipality failed in the 18th and 19th centuries.

Originally, the religious center of the region was Golino with the Church of San Giorgio, which was built before 1297. In 1474, the chapel of S. Gottardo in Intragna was built. In 1653 it split from the parish of Golino (which had been created in the 16th century). The parish of Intragna was elevated to have a provost in 1747. The present church of S. Nome di Maria was built in 1722–38. In 1765–75 the bell tower was added, and with a height of 65 metres (213 ft) it is the highest in the canton of Ticino. The parish of Palagnedra was established in the 12th century, and in 1622 Verdasio split from it, followed in 1644 by Rasa. The latter has had a rector since 2000. The church of S. Anna in Rasa was completed in 1753, while the church in Verdasio (SS Giacomo e Cristoforo), was built around 1800.

Traditionally, the major sources of income have always been farming and animal husbandry. But in the 1950s, these lost importance. Starting in the 16th century, the income from seasonal migration (especially chimney sweep in Lombardy and Piedmont) were added to the local economy. Between 1631 and 1847 the people of Rasa (along with Ronco, Losone and Terre di Pedemonte) possessed the monopoly for loading operations at the Custom House of Livorno. In the second half of the 19th century there was a strong emigration overseas (America, Australia). The local industrial production; watch factory, the quarry, the carpentry factory and the Peduli factory (cloth shoes with hemp soles from the early 20th century to 1962) came to a halt in the 1960s.

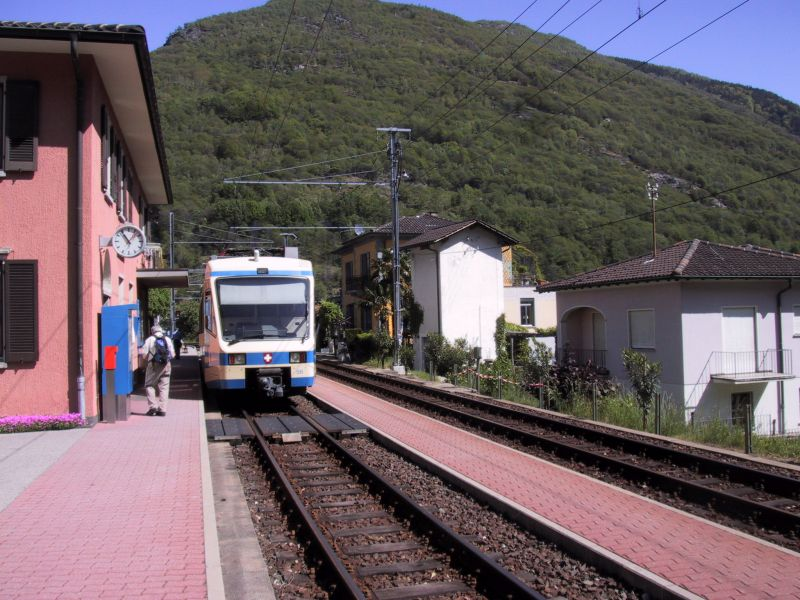
Intragna train station

Between 1889 and 1893, the main road was built, followed in 1923 by a station on the Domodossola – Locarno railway line. Pila and Costa (1953) and Rasa (since 1958) are accessible only by cable car. In 1929, an old-age and nursing home opened in San Donato. Intragna is the seat of the Regional Museum for the Centovalli and Terre di Pedemonte, which opened in 1989. While the population in the higher settlements has declined sharply (Rasa: 200 inhabitants at the beginning of the 16th century, while only 11 in 1970), Intragna and Golino, due to their proximity to Locarno, have grown since 1970. In 2000, two-thirds of the employed worked in the services sector, and about the same numbers commuted out of the municipality for work.

Intragna was formerly a municipality. On 25 October 2009 Intragna merged with the municipalities of Borgnone and Palagnedra to re-form the municipality of Centovalli.

== Location ==
The former municipality is in the Locarno district. The hamlet on a promontory at the confluence of the Isorno and Melezza rivers. Golino, Verdasio, Pila, Vosa, Cremaso, Calezzo, Costa, Corcapolo and Rasa are fraziones of Intragna. While Intragna and Golino are geographically and economically part of the Pedemonte (Tegna, Verscio, Cavigliano), the largest part of the township lies in the mountains and the alpine pastures of Centovalli.

== Historic population ==
The historical population is given in the following table:

| Year | Population Intragna |
|---|---|
| 1653 | 604 |
| 1764 | over 1,000 |
| 1801 | 936 |
| 1850 | 1,428 |
| 1900 | 1,240 |
| 1950 | 957 |
| 1970 | 841 |
| 2000 | 915 |
