= Gurro =

- Comune
- Comune di Gurro
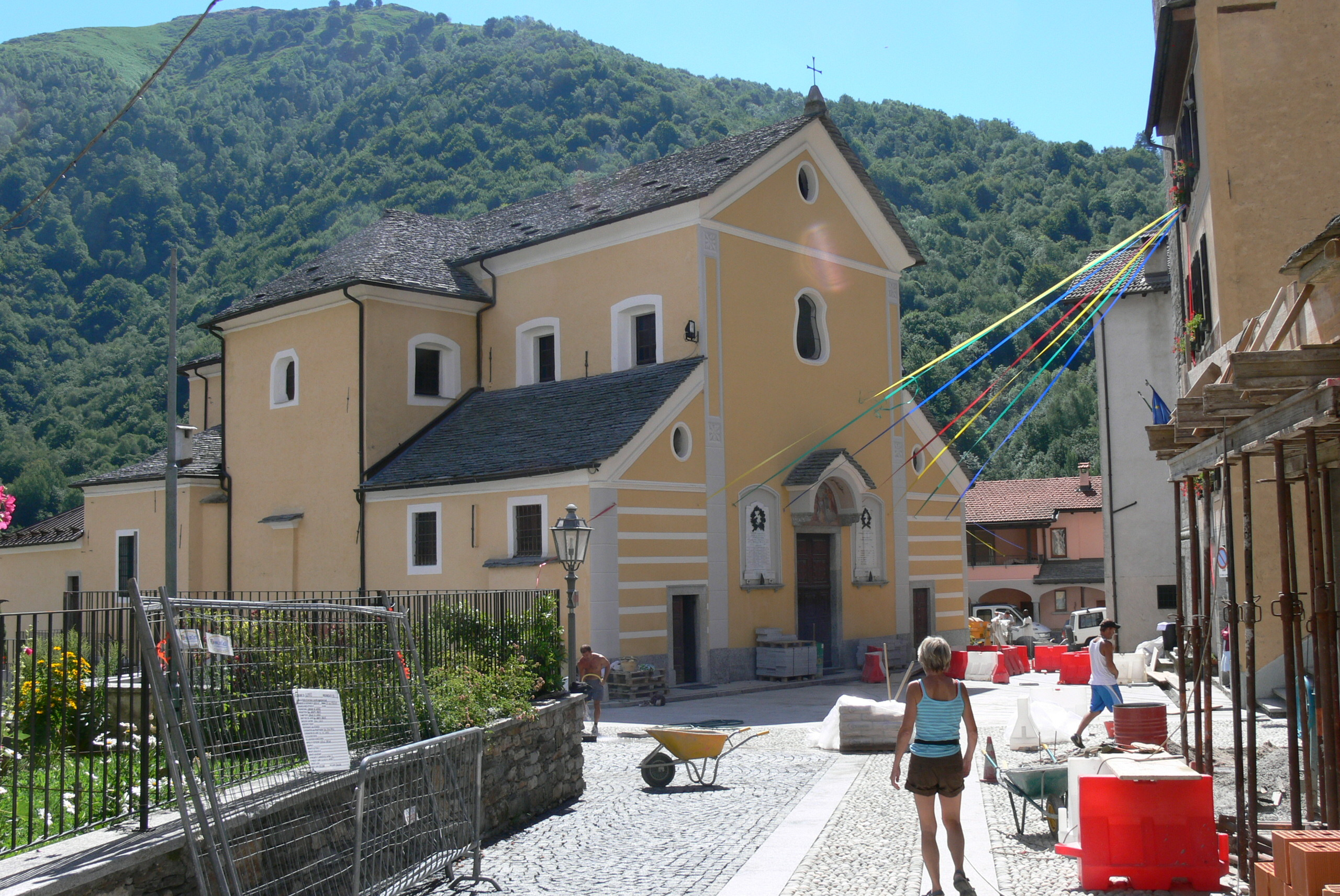
- Parish church

- Location within Italy Location within Piedmont
- Coordinates: 46°5′6″N 8°34′0″E
- Country: Italy
- Region: Piedmont
- Province: Province of Verbano-Cusio-Ossola (VB)

Area
  - Total: 13.2 km^{2} (5.1 sq mi)

Population (Dec. 2004)
  - Total: 288
  - Density: 21.8/km^{2} (56.5/sq mi)
- Time zone: UTC+1 (CET)
  - Summer (DST): UTC+2 (CEST)
- Postal code: 28050
- Dialing code: 0323

Gurro is a comune (municipality) in the Province of Verbano-Cusio-Ossola in the Italian region Piedmont, located about 140 kilometres (87 mi) northeast of Turin and about 20 kilometres (12 mi) northeast of Verbania. As of 31 December 2004, it had a population of 288 and an area of 13.2 square kilometres (5.1 mi^{2}).

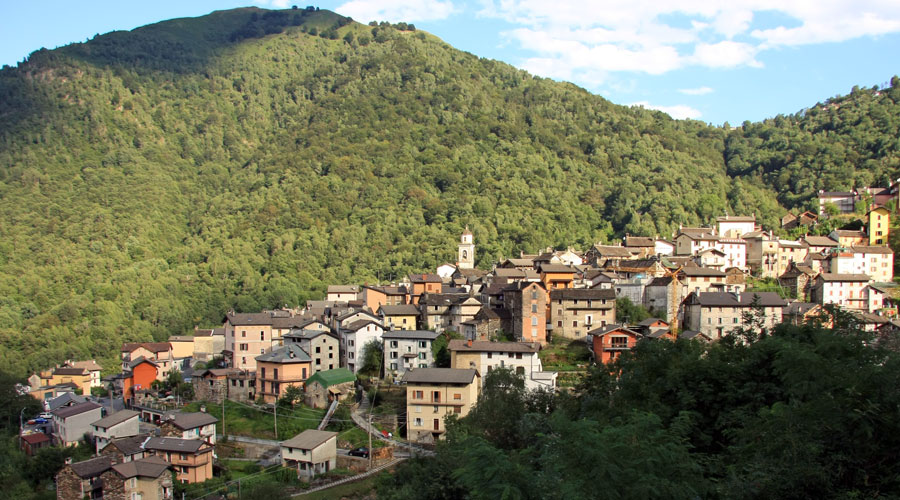
View of the town

Gurro borders the municipalities of Miazzina and Valle Cannobina.

Gurro is said to be populated by the descendants of Scottish soldiers. According to local legend, Scottish soldiers fleeing the Battle of Pavia (24 February 1525) arrived in the area where severe blizzards forced many, if not all, to give up their travels and settle in the town. Gurro is proud of its Scottish links, many Scottish flags fly around the village. Many residents claim their surnames are Italian translations of Scottish surnames, and the town also has a Scottish museum. Many quirks of the village's dialect are said to be from Gaelic.

== Demographic evolution ==
Historical population

Year	Pop.	±%
1861	713	—
1871	779	+9.3%
1881	882	+13.2%
1901	988	+12.0%
1911	1,028	+4.0%

Year	Pop.	±%
1921	1,042	+1.4%
1931	947	−9.1%
1936	880	−7.1%
1951	818	−7.0%
1961	725	−11.4%

Year	Pop.	±%
1971	627	−13.5%
1981	608	−3.0%
1991	466	−23.4%
2001	310	−33.5%

Source: Data from ISTAT
