= Centovalli =

- Municipality
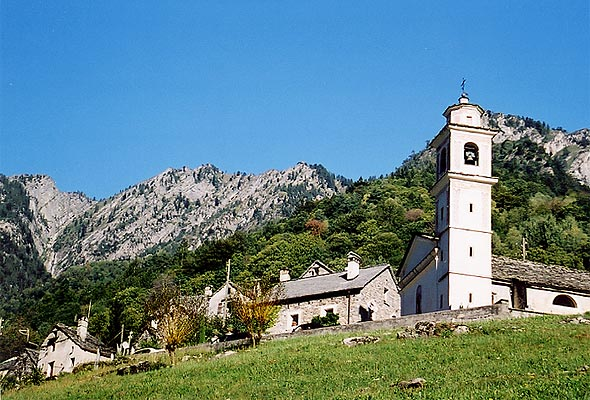

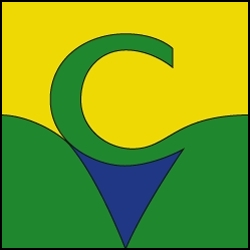
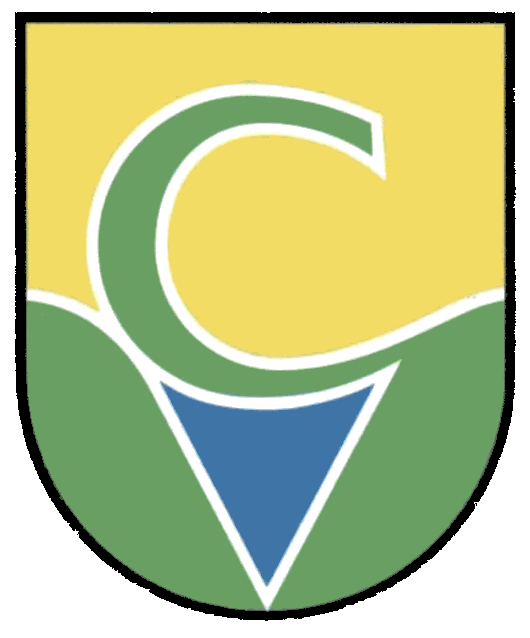
- Flag Coat of arms
- Location of Centovalli
- Location within Switzerland Location within Canton of Ticino
- Coordinates: 46°10′N 8°37′E
- Country: Switzerland
- Canton: Ticino
- District: Locarno

Government
  - Mayor: Sindaco

Area
  - Total: 51.1 km^{2} (19.7 sq mi)
- Elevation: 708 m (2,323 ft)

Population (2017)
  - Total: 1,183
  - Density: 23.2/km^{2} (60.0/sq mi)
- Time zone: UTC+01:00 (CET)
  - Summer (DST): UTC+02:00 (CEST)
- Postal code: 6657
- SFOS number: 5397
- ISO 3166 code: CH-TI
- Website: www.comunecentovalli.ch

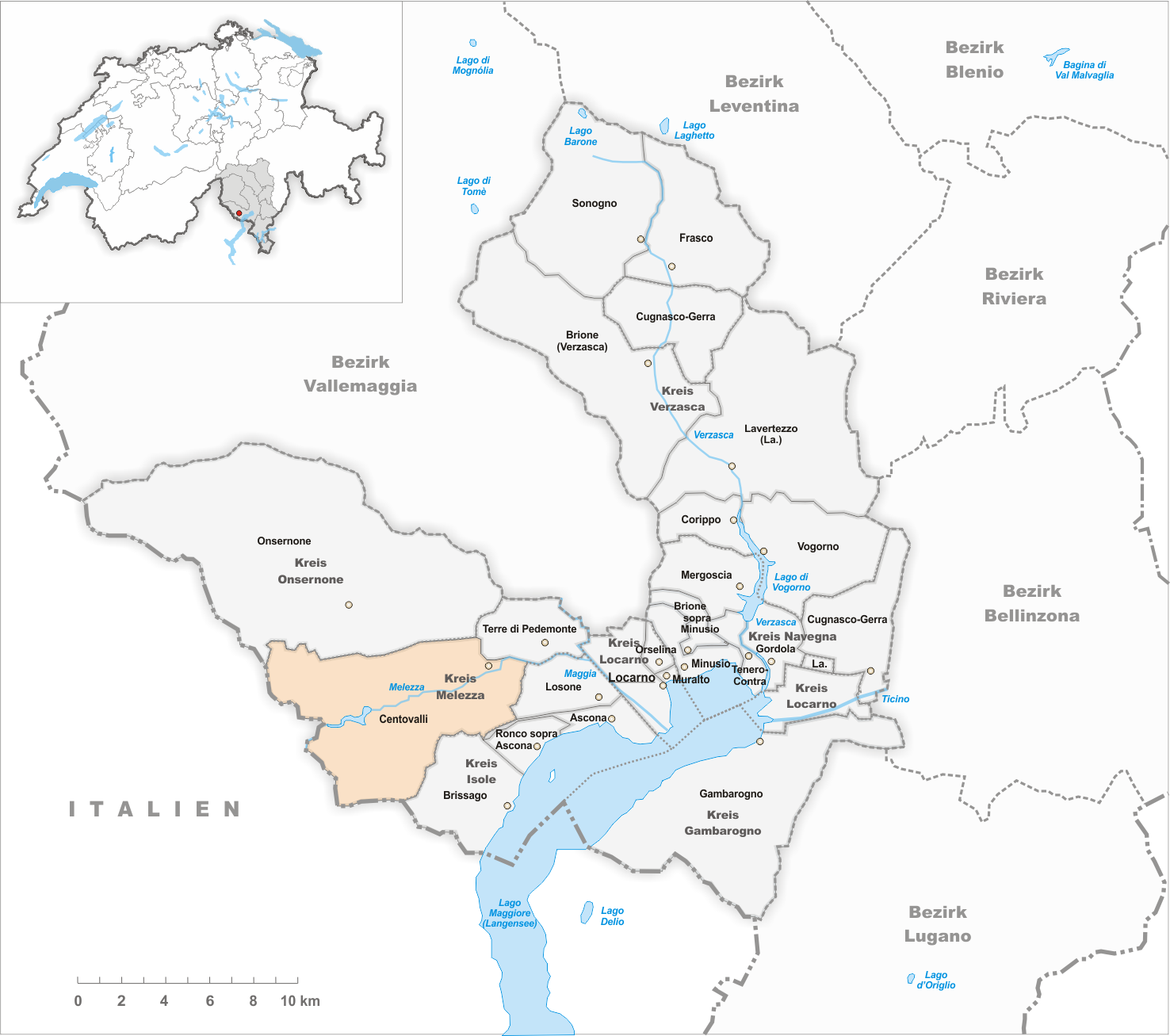
Map of Centovalli Municipality

Centovalli (literally: hundred valleys) is a valley and a municipality in the district of Locarno in the canton of Ticino in Switzerland. It is composed of 19 villages or hamlets "frazioni". The municipality was formed on 25 October 2009 through the merger of the municipalities of Borgnone, Intragna and Palagnedra.

== History ==
Intragna is first mentioned in 1272 as Intranea. Camedo is first mentioned in 1294 as Camedum. Borgnone is first mentioned in 1364 as Brugnono. Palagnedra is first mentioned in 1379 as Pallagnidrio.

=== Borgnone ===
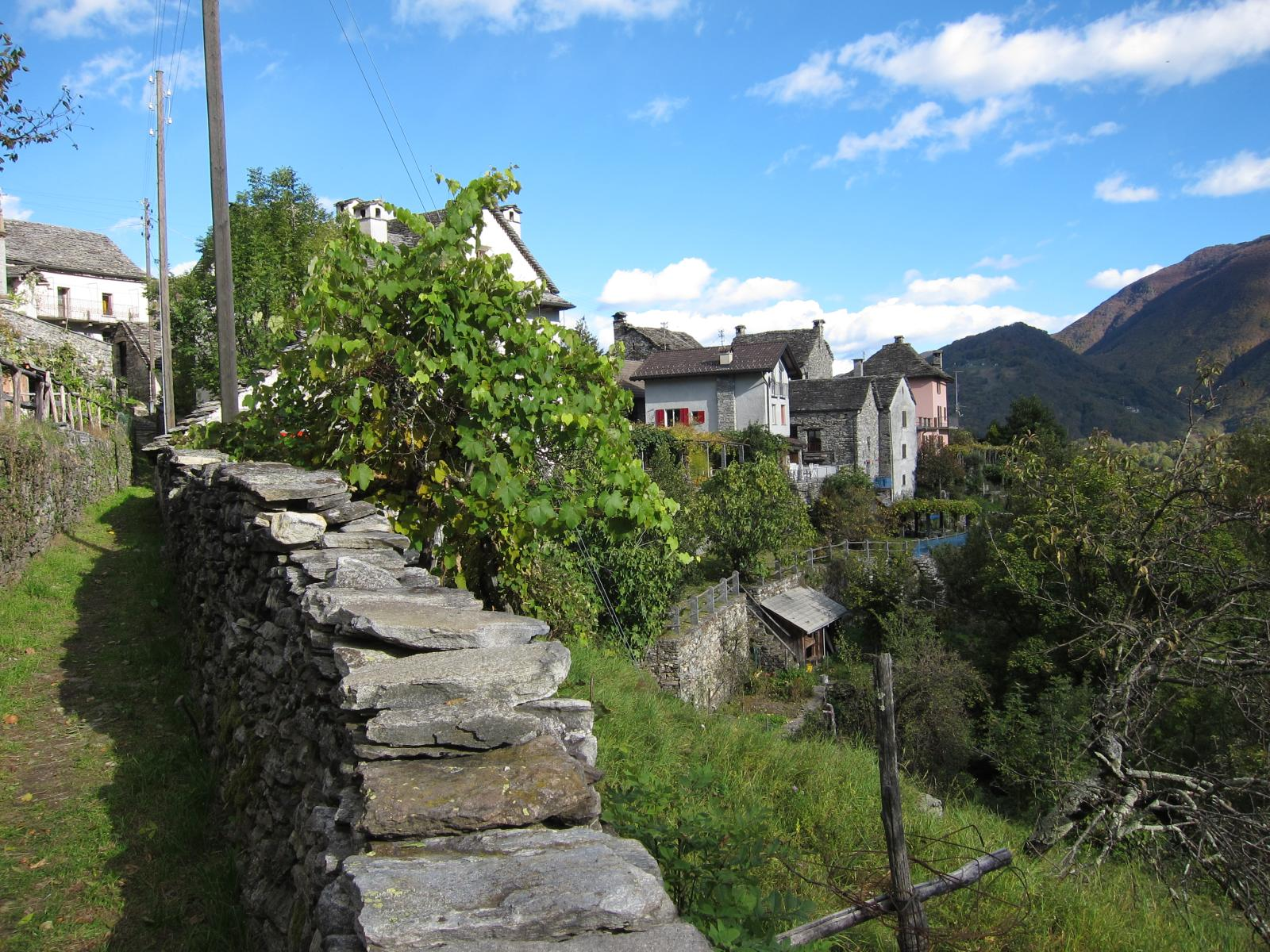
Borgnone hamlet

In the Middle Ages it was part of the Locarno region. In the 15th century, it became a Degagna, which was part of the bailiwick of Locarno between the 16th century and 1798. It then became an independent political municipality when the municipality of Centovalli was split in 1838.

It belonged to the parish of Palagnedra and in 1630 became a vice-parish. The Church of Beata Vergine dell'Assunta (built 1364–65) underwent several transformations.

A strong seasonal emigration supplemented the income from agriculture and animal husbandry of the residents. The majority of the population (1990: 70%) is in the services sector, and half of all residences are second or vacation homes. In 1923 the Locarno-Domodossola rail line was completed.

=== Intragna ===
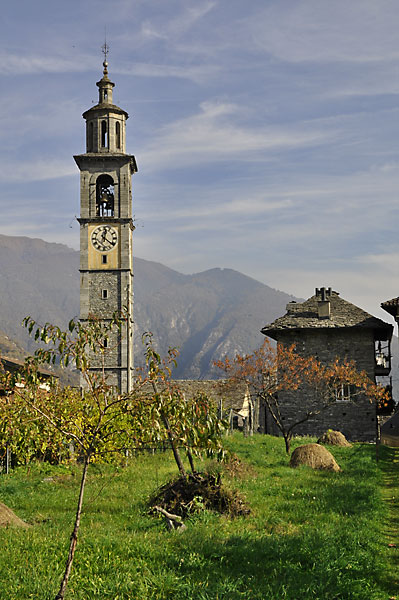
Bell tower of S. Nome di Maria, the tallest in Ticino

In 1897, several pre-Roman graves were discovered, which show the colonization of the area before the 1st Millennium BC.

During the Middle Ages the landlords over the village included both the Bishop of Como and the Capitanei of Locarno. Together with Golino and Verdasio, Intragna was part of a Vicinanza. The first statutes of the Vicinanza were written in 1365 and were revised in 1469. They possessed the right to appoint one representative to the Council of the parish of Locarno. The mayor (or console) was alternately appointed during five years by Intragna, then by one provided by Golini and Verdasio. From the 16th to 18th century, it was part of the bailiwick of Locarno. In 1531, the Swiss Confederation rejected an application from Intragna, Ascona, Onsernone and Centovalli to form a municipality that was independent of Locarno. Likewise, the conflict-ridden attempts of Golinos to form an independent municipality failed in the 18th and 19th centuries.

Originally, the religious center of the region was Golino with the Church of San Giorgio, which was built before 1297. In 1474, the chapel of S. Gottardo in Intragna was built. In 1653 it split from the parish of Golino (which had been created in the 16th century). The parish of Intragna was elevated to have a provost in 1747. The present church of S. Nome di Maria was built in 1722–38. In 1765-75 the bell tower was added, and with a height of 65 meters (213 ft) it is the highest in the canton of Ticino. The parish of Palagnedra was established in the 12th century, and in 1622 Verdasio split from it, followed in 1644 by Rasa. The latter has had a rector since 2000. The church of S. Anna in Rasa was completed in 1753, while the church in Verdasio (SS Giacomo e Cristoforo), was built around 1800.

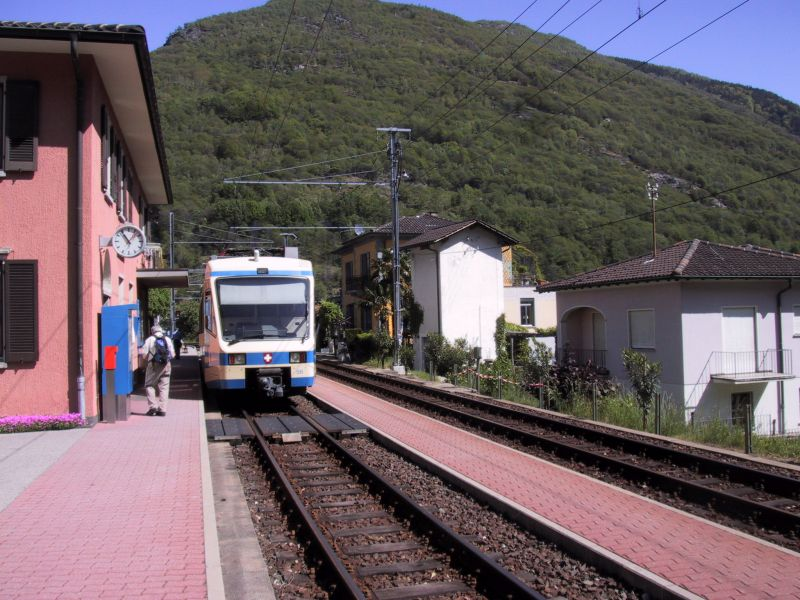
Intragna train station

Traditionally, the major sources of income have always been farming and animal husbandry. But in the 1950s, these lost importance. Starting in the 16th century, the income from seasonal migration (especially chimney sweep in Lombardy and Piedmont) were added to the local economy. Between 1631 and 1847 the people of Rasa (along with Ronco, Losone and Terre di Pedemonte) possessed the monopoly for loading operations at the Custom House of Livorno. In the second half of the 19th century there was a strong emigration overseas (America, Australia). The local industrial production; watch factory, the quarry, the carpentry factory and the Peduli factory (cloth shoes with hemp soles from the early 20th century to 1962) came to a halt in the 1960s.

Between 1889 and 1893, the main road was built, followed in 1923 by a station on the Locarno-Domodossola railway line. Pila and Costa (1953) and Rasa (since 1958) are accessible only by cable car. In 1929, an old-age and nursing home opened in San Donato. Intragna is the seat of the Regional Museum for the Centovalli and Terre di Pedemonte, which opened in 1989. While the population in the higher settlements has declined sharply (Rasa: 200 inhabitants at the beginning of the 16th century, while only 11 in 1970), Intragna and Golino, due to their proximity to Locarno, have grown since 1970. In 2000, two-thirds of the employed worked in the services sector, and about the same numbers commuted out of the municipality for work.

=== Palagnedra ===
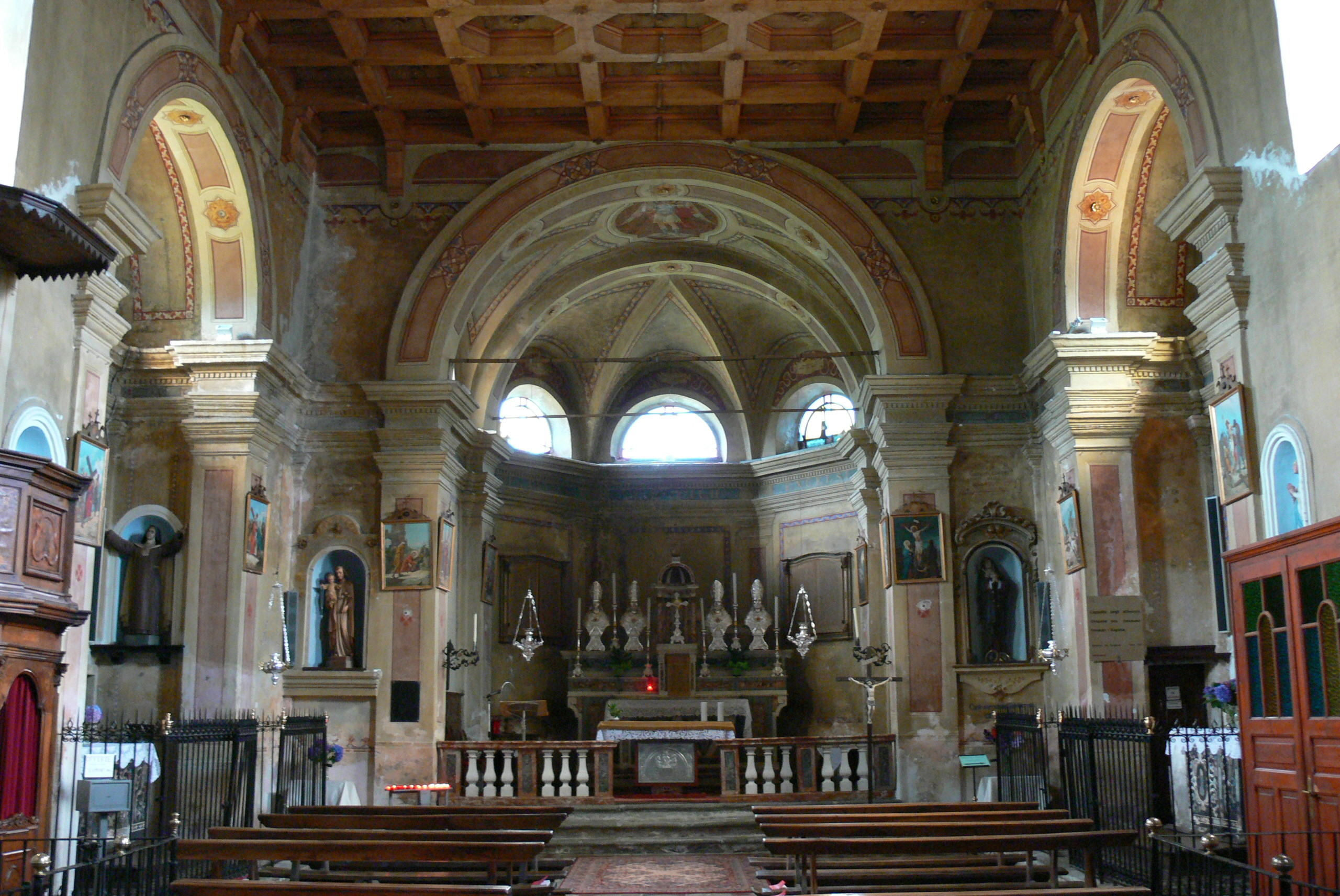
Interior of San Michele

During the Middle Ages, Palagnedra was the administrative and religious center in the 13th-century Centovalli valley community. In the 16th century it became part of the Locarno and Ascona region, followed by the bailiwick of Locarno. In 1864 the village became independent.

The church of San Michele was built between 1640–1732 and renovated in 1964-66 and again between 1999 and 2001. It was the mother church of the Centovalli valley and contains the best preserved late gothic cycle of frescoes by Antonio da Tradate.

Traditionally the local economy was based around agriculture and grazing. Starting in the 16th century some of the income came from the seasonal migration to Italy. Initially, most of the seasonal workers were laborers. This changed in the 19th century to cooks going to Tuscany. Until the 1950s, the vicinity of the Italian Swiss border encouraged smuggling. In 1950-52 a hydroelectric dam was built. In 2005 about a third of the jobs in Palagnedra related to the agricultural sector.

On 25 October 2009 the municipalities of Borgnone, Intragna and Palagnedra merged into the municipality of Centovalli.

== Coat of arms ==
The present coat of arms was adopted in 2009. Designed by a graphic artist rather than a herald, it is a decorative treatment of the letters C and V, but cannot be blazoned. The municipal website describes it as being of green and gold, with a capital C dominating the blue of the valley and water, bordered with white.

== Geography ==
Aerial view (1946)

Centovalli has an area, as of 1997, of 51.39 square kilometers (19.84 sq mi). Of this area, 2.11 km^{2} (0.81 sq mi) or 4.1% is used for agricultural purposes, while 39.47 km^{2} (15.24 sq mi) or 76.8% is forested. Of the rest of the land, 1.02 km^{2} (0.39 sq mi) or 2.0% is settled (buildings or roads), 1.18 km^{2} (0.46 sq mi) or 2.3% is either rivers or lakes and 7.09 km^{2} (2.74 sq mi) or 13.8% is unproductive land.

Of the built up area, housing and buildings made up 1.2% and transportation infrastructure made up 0.6%. Out of the forested land, 70.5% of the total land area is heavily forested and 4.3% is covered with orchards or small clusters of trees. Of the agricultural land, 2.6% is used for growing crops and 1.2% is used for alpine pastures. Of the water in the municipality, 0.6% is in lakes and 1.7% is in rivers and streams. Of the unproductive areas, 7.0% is unproductive vegetation and 6.8% is too rocky for vegetation.

It consists of the villages or frazioni of Bordei, Borgnone, Calezzo, Camedo, Corcapolo con Salmina, Costa sopra Borgnone, Costa sopra Intragna, Cremaso, Cresto, Golino, Intragna, Lionza, Monadello, Moneto, Palagnedra, Pila, Rasa, Verdasio con Bolle e Sassalto and Vosa.

== Location ==
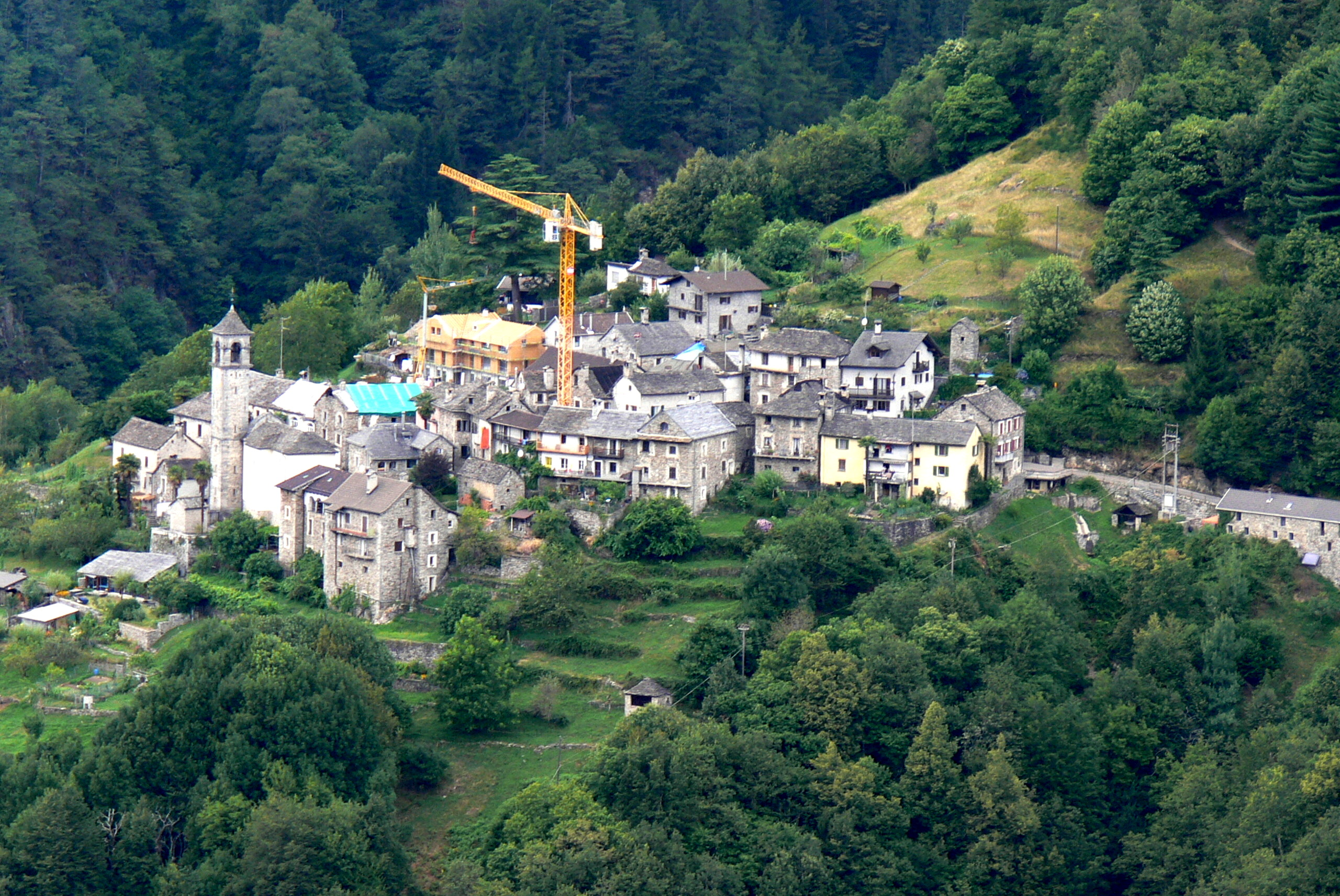
Verdasio near Intragna, seen from Rasa

The municipality is located in the Centovalli, a valley which was carved by the Melezza river and which has allegedly 100 adjoining valleys (cento valli). The municipality's western border is the Swiss-Italy border. In addition to Borgnone, Intragna and Palagnedra, it includes the settlements of Costa, Lionza, Golino, Verdasio, Pila, Vosa, Cremaso, Calezzo, Costa, Corcapolo, Rasa, Bordei, and Camedo (on the valley floor with a customs station and train station).

== Demographics ==
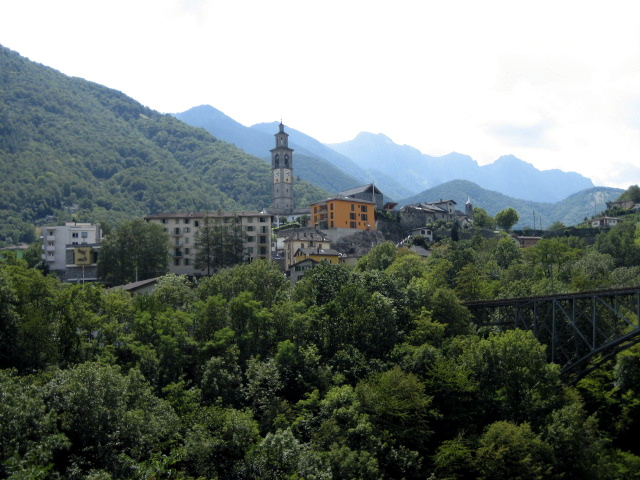
Intragna village

Centovalli has a population (as of December 2020) of 1,135.

As of 2008, the gender distribution of the population was 45.4% male and 54.6% female. The population was made up of 453 Swiss men (39.7% of the population), and 65 (5.7%) non-Swiss men. There were 570 Swiss women (49.9%), and 54 (4.7%) non-Swiss women.

The age distribution, as of 2009, in Centovalli is; 58 children or 5.1% of the population are between 0 and 9 years old and 88 teenagers or 7.7% are between 10 and 19. Of the adult population, 152 people or 13.3% of the population are between 20 and 29 years old. 121 people or 10.6% are between 30 and 39, 166 people or 14.5% are between 40 and 49, and 181 people or 15.8% are between 50 and 59. The senior population distribution is 196 people or 17.2% of the population are between 60 and 69 years old, 95 people or 8.3% are between 70 and 79, there are 85 people or 7.4% who are over 80.

In Borgnone, (as of 2000), 27 speak German, 116 people speak Italian.

In Intragna, (as of 2000), 162 speak German, 18 people speak French, 716 people speak Italian, and 2 people speak Romansh. The remainder (17 people) speak another language.

In Palagnedra (as of 2000), 17 speak German, 1 person speaks French, 73 people speak Italian. The remainder (1 person) speak another language.

== Religion ==
=== Borgnone ===
From the 2000 census, 96 or 67.1% were Roman Catholic, while 14 or 9.8% belonged to the Swiss Reformed Church. There are 23 individuals (or about 16.08% of the population) who belong to different church (not listed on the census), and 10 individuals (or about 6.99% of the population) did not answer the question.

=== Intragna ===
From the 2000 census, 674 or 73.7% were Roman Catholic, while 106 or 11.6% belonged to the Swiss Reformed Church. There are 104 individuals (or about 11.37% of the population) who belong to another church (not listed on the census), and 31 individuals (or about 3.39% of the population) did not answer the question.

=== Palagnedra ===
From the 2000 census, 70 or 76.1% were Roman Catholic, while 7 or 7.6% belonged to the Swiss Reformed Church. There are 12 individuals (or about 13.04% of the population) who belong to another church (not listed on the census), and 3 individuals (or about 3.26% of the population) did not answer the question.

== Housing ==
=== Borgnone ===
In 2000 there were 149 single family homes (or 87.6% of the total) out of a total of 170 inhabited buildings. There were 10 two family buildings (5.9%) and 4 multi-family buildings (2.4%). There were also 7 buildings in the municipality that were multipurpose buildings (used for both housing and commercial or another purpose). Of these apartments, a total of 62 apartments (32.6% of the total) were permanently occupied, while 126 apartments (66.3%) were seasonally occupied and 2 apartments (1.1%) were empty. In 2000 there were 190 apartments in the municipality. The most common apartment size was the 3 room apartment of which there were 57. There were 8 single room apartments and 53 apartments with five or more rooms.

=== Intragna ===
In 2000 there were 612 single family homes (or 83.2% of the total) out of a total of 736 inhabited buildings. There were 84 two family buildings (11.4%) and 20 multi-family buildings (2.7%). There were also 20 buildings in the municipality that were multipurpose buildings (used for both housing and commercial or another purpose). Of these apartments, a total of 392 apartments (44.6% of the total) were permanently occupied, while 480 apartments (54.6%) were seasonally occupied and 7 apartments (0.8%) were empty. In 2000 there were 879 apartments in the municipality. The most common apartment size was the 3 room apartment of which there were 221. There were 82 single room apartments and 209 apartments with five or more rooms.

=== Palagnedra ===
In 2000 there were 141 single family homes (or 94.0% of the total) out of a total of 150 inhabited buildings. There were 6 two family buildings (4.0%) and 2 multi-family buildings (1.3%). There were also 1 buildings in the municipality that was a multipurpose buildings (used for both housing and commercial or another purpose). Of these apartments, a total of 54 apartments (33.1% of the total) were permanently occupied, while 109 apartments (66.9%) were seasonally occupied. In 2000 there were 163 apartments in the village. The most common apartment size was the 4 room apartment of which there were 52. There were 8 single room apartments and 40 apartments with five or more rooms.

== Historic population ==
The historical population is given in the following table:

Year	Population Borgnone	Population Intragna	Population Palagnedra
1591	13 Households	-	-
1653	-	604	-
1764	-	Over 1,000	-
1801	290	936	-
1850	409	1,428	337
1900	393	1,240	267
1950	307	957	298
1970	-	841	-
2000	143	915	92

== Education ==
In Centovalli there were a total of 126 students (as of 2009). The Ticino education system provides up to three years of non-mandatory kindergarten and in Centovalli there were 17 children in kindergarten. The primary school program lasts for five years and includes both a standard school and a special school. In the municipality, 35 students attended the standard primary schools and 1 student attended the special school. In the lower secondary school system, students either attend a two-year middle school followed by a two-year pre-apprenticeship or they attend a four-year program to prepare for higher education. There were 41 students in the two-year middle school, while 9 students were in the four-year advanced program.

The upper secondary school includes several options, but at the end of the upper secondary program, a student will be prepared to enter a trade or to continue on to a university or college. In Ticino, vocational students may either attend school while working on their internship or apprenticeship (which takes three or four years) or may attend school followed by an internship or apprenticeship (which takes one year as a full-time student or one and a half to two years as a part-time student). There were 5 vocational students who were attending school full-time and 15 who attend part-time.

The professional program lasts three years and prepares a student for a job in engineering, nursing, computer science, business, tourism and similar fields. There were 3 students in the professional program.

== Heritage sites of national significance ==
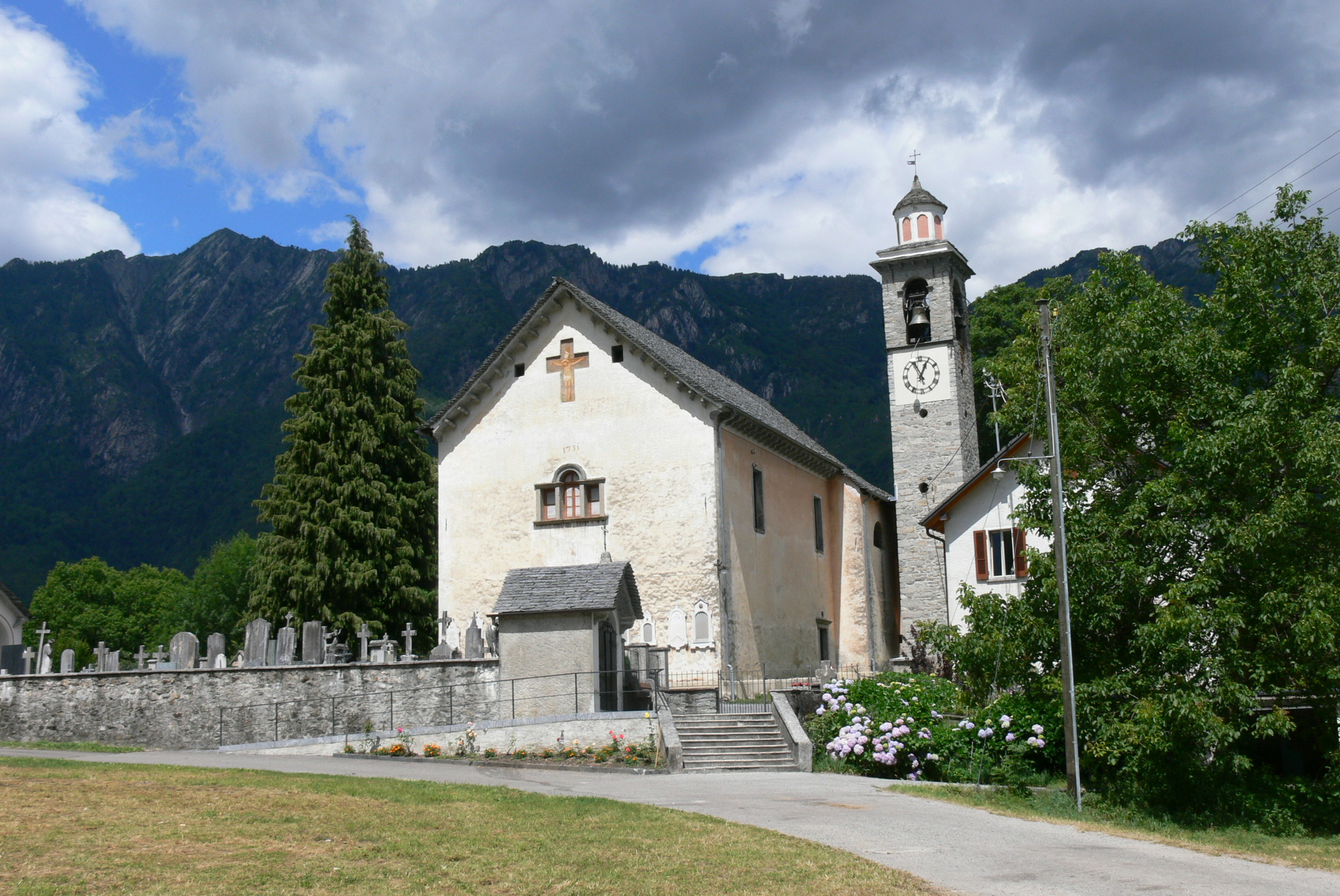
Parish Church of S. Michele

The Parish Church of S. Michele and its Piazza are listed as Swiss heritage site of national significance. The villages of Borgnone, Costa, Golino, Intragna, Lionza, Palagnedra, Rasa, Verdasio and Bordei are all listed as part of the Inventory of Swiss Heritage Sites.

== Crime ==
In 2014 the crime rate, of the over 200 crimes listed in the Swiss Criminal Code (running from murder, robbery and assault to accepting bribes and election fraud), in Centovalli was 32.3 per thousand residents. This rate is lower than average, at only 60.0% of the rate in the district, 58.9% of the cantonal rate and 50.0% of the average rate in the entire country. During the same period, the rate of drug crimes was 7.6 per thousand residents. This rate is lower than average, at only 66.7% of the rate in the district. The rate of violations of immigration, visa and work permit laws was 2.5 per thousand residents. This rate is lower than average, only 69.4% of the rate in the canton and only 51.0% of the rate for the entire country.

== Economy ==
As of 2009, there were 7 hotels in Centovalli with a total of 64 rooms and 133 beds.
