= Spruga =

Village in Ticino, Switzerland

Spruga (Onsernone)
- Municipality
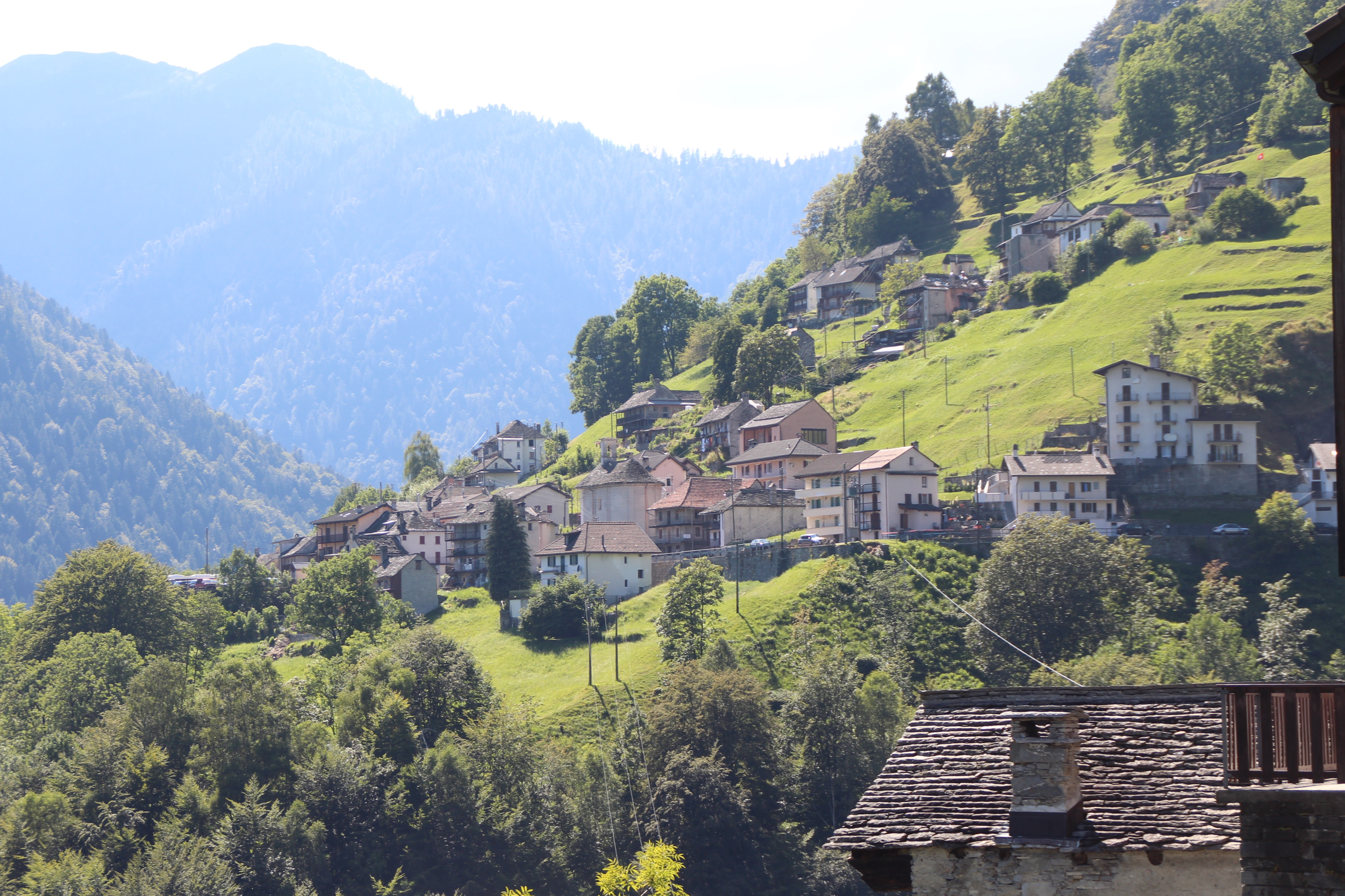
- Spruga village, as seen from the east
- Location of Spruga (Onsernone)
- Location within Switzerland Location within Canton of Ticino
- Coordinates: 46°12′3.2328″N 8°34′6.5418″E
- Country: Switzerland
- Canton: Ticino
- District: Locarno
- Elevation: 1,390 m (4,560 ft)

Population (December 2000)
  - Total: 53
- Time zone: UTC+01:00 (CET)
  - Summer (DST): UTC+02:00 (CEST)
- Postal code: 6663
- ISO 3166 code: CH-TI
- Surrounded by: Borgnone, Craveggia (IT-VB), Gresso, Isorno, Maggia, Mosogno, Re (IT-VB), Vergeletto
- Website: https://onsernone.ch

Spruga (La Sprüga in Ticinese dialect, Sprugg in Swiss German) is a village in the Swiss municipality of Onsernone, in the district of Locarno, in the canton of Ticino. It lies on the sunny, south-facing slopes above the Isorno river on the border of Italy. The first recorded mention of Spruga goes back to the year 1285. Spruga is the last village on the sole road into the Onsernone Valley as well as the nearest settlement to the thermal baths at Bagni di Craveggia where a 6-story hotel, now in ruins but open to the public, was built in 1819. In the 19th century, visitors to the baths had to take an 8-hour carriage ride from Locarno to Comologno and then walk the last three to four kilometers on a dirt trail through Spruga with their luggage on mules or carried by locals. Mail service was brought into and from the Onsernone Valley on foot to Loco, where mail was then distributed and collected.

An upgraded road to Comologno was built between 1898 and 1900. Since 1932, when the old foot- and mule path between Spruga and Comologno was upgraded to a road, Spruga has been tied into Switzerland's extensive public transit system by PostBus Switzerland which offers connections from morning until late evening as well as providing mail service. Similar to other remote, mountainous regions in Switzerland, the large Post buses have become a key feature of the region and a tourist attraction in their own right, as they traverse up and down the valley's narrow, winding road, sounding their iconic three-tone horn to warn cars and pedestrians of their approach, often passing through villages with only centimeters of clearance from buildings on either side.

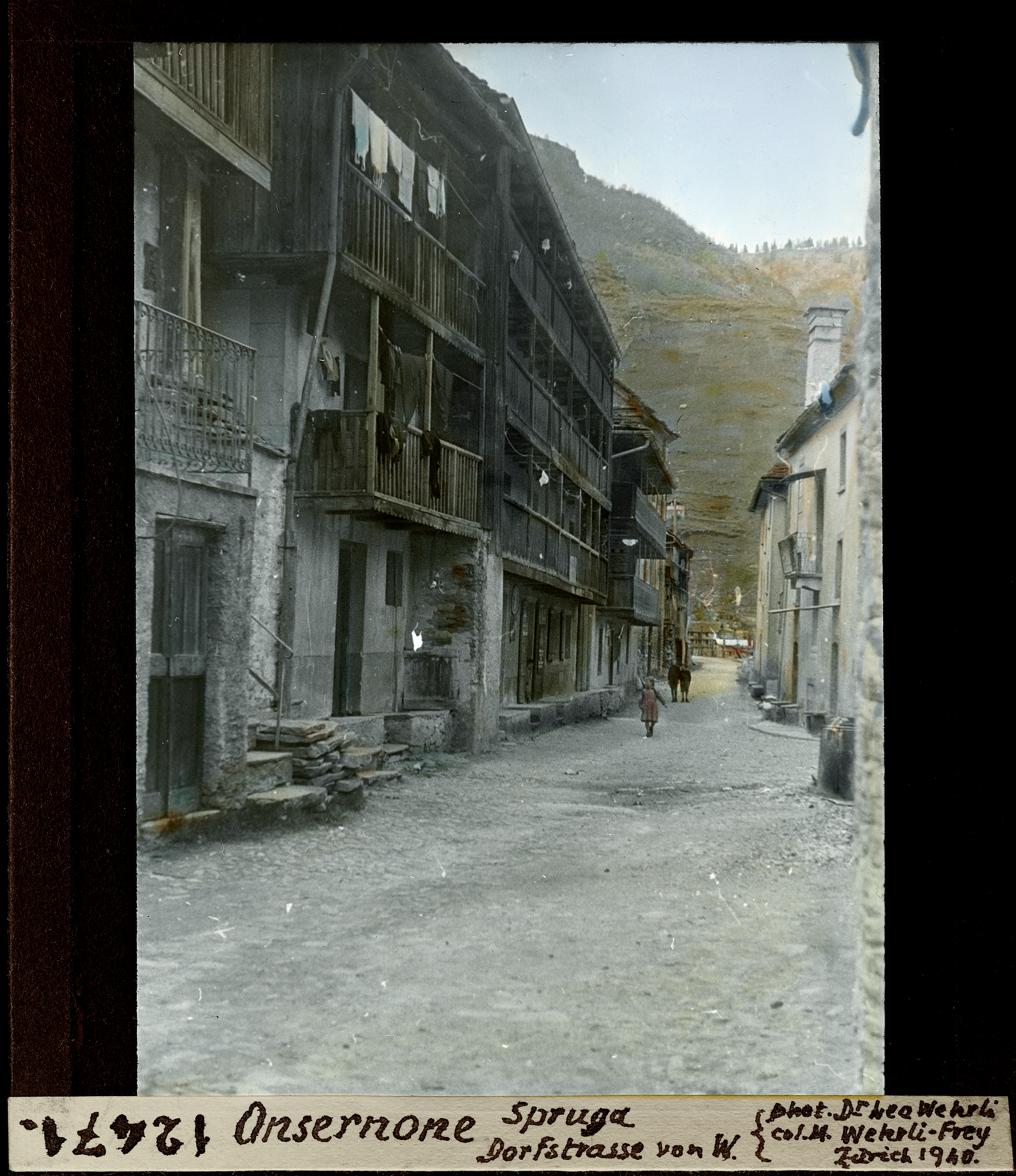
Spruga village street. Historic (1940) photo by Leo Wehrli

== Political organization ==
The political associations of Spruga have changed over the centuries as the valley's population boomed and then declined again. During the Ancien Régime, Spruga belonged to the Squadra of Crana which, together with the other villages of the valley (with the exception of Auressio), formed the medieval municipality of Onsernone. The former Comune di Onsernone was divided into five squadre (localities) and 20 terre (fractions) until its dissolution as a political unit at the beginning of the 19th century:

- Loco (Loco, Niva, Maltino, Rossa, Ighelon),
- Berzona (Berzona, Seghelina),
- Mosogno (Mosogno Sopra, Mosogno Sotto, Cioss, Barione, Oviga),
- Russo (Russo, Quiello, Gresso, Vergeletto) and
- Crana (Crana, Vocaglia, Comologno, Spruga).

With the establishment of the Canton of Ticino in 1803, Spruga became part of the independent municipality of Comologno.

In the late 20th century, with the number of permanent residents declining throughout the valley as the region's local economy transitioned from farming to tourism and vacation homes, Comologno merged with the neighboring municipalities Crana and Russo in 1995 to form a new municipality, based on the historical name, Onsernone. Onsernone grew again, now to encompass the entire Onsernone Valley, when on 10 April 2016 it absorbed the former municipalities of Vergeletto, Gresso, Mosogno and Isorno. Within Onsernone, Spruga remains part of the Citizens' Community (Italian: Patriziato) of Comologno.

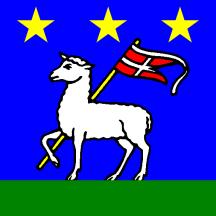

Spruga is represented on the coat of arms of Comologno as one of three stars, the others representing the villages of Corbella und Vocaglia. The Agnus Dei (Lamb of God) refers to John the Baptist, the patron Saint of Comologno's parish church.

== Border violation on October 18–19, 1944 ==
In the final phase of the Second World War, Fascist Italian troops and Italian partisan units of the short-lived Ossola Partisan Republic fought each other in northern Italy. In October 1944, the survivors of the partisan brigade Perotti retreated to the Swiss border at the Bagni di Craveggia near Spruga after a rearguard action. Its commander, Filippo Frasati, requested internment in Switzerland, which was refused, as Swiss regulations only permitted the internment of combatants in the event of imminent danger of death.

From October 12, 1944, the border was reinforced by the motorized Mitrailleur Company 9 of the Swiss Army, whose officers made arrangements with the partisans to cross the border in the event of a fascist attack. This took place on October 18, 1944, when around 200 fascist troops opened fire on the partisans, with many bullets also hitting Swiss territory. The partisans fled to Switzerland as agreed, and one of their officers was killed on Swiss soil.

The fascist commander demanded that the partisans be handed over, which the Swiss commander refused to do. After the border around Spruga was reinforced by more Swiss troops, the fascist troops left the area again. The 256 surviving partisans were interned in Locarno until the end of the war.

Today, plaques in the area commemorate this history.

== Local language ==
In La Sprüga, the locals are called Sprüghin and speak a variety of Swiss Italian, a dialect heavily influenced by German. Of particular note is the pronunciation of the letter "r", which shows a distinct palatalization of Germanic character.
