= Onsernone Valley =

Populated valley in western Ticino, Switzerland

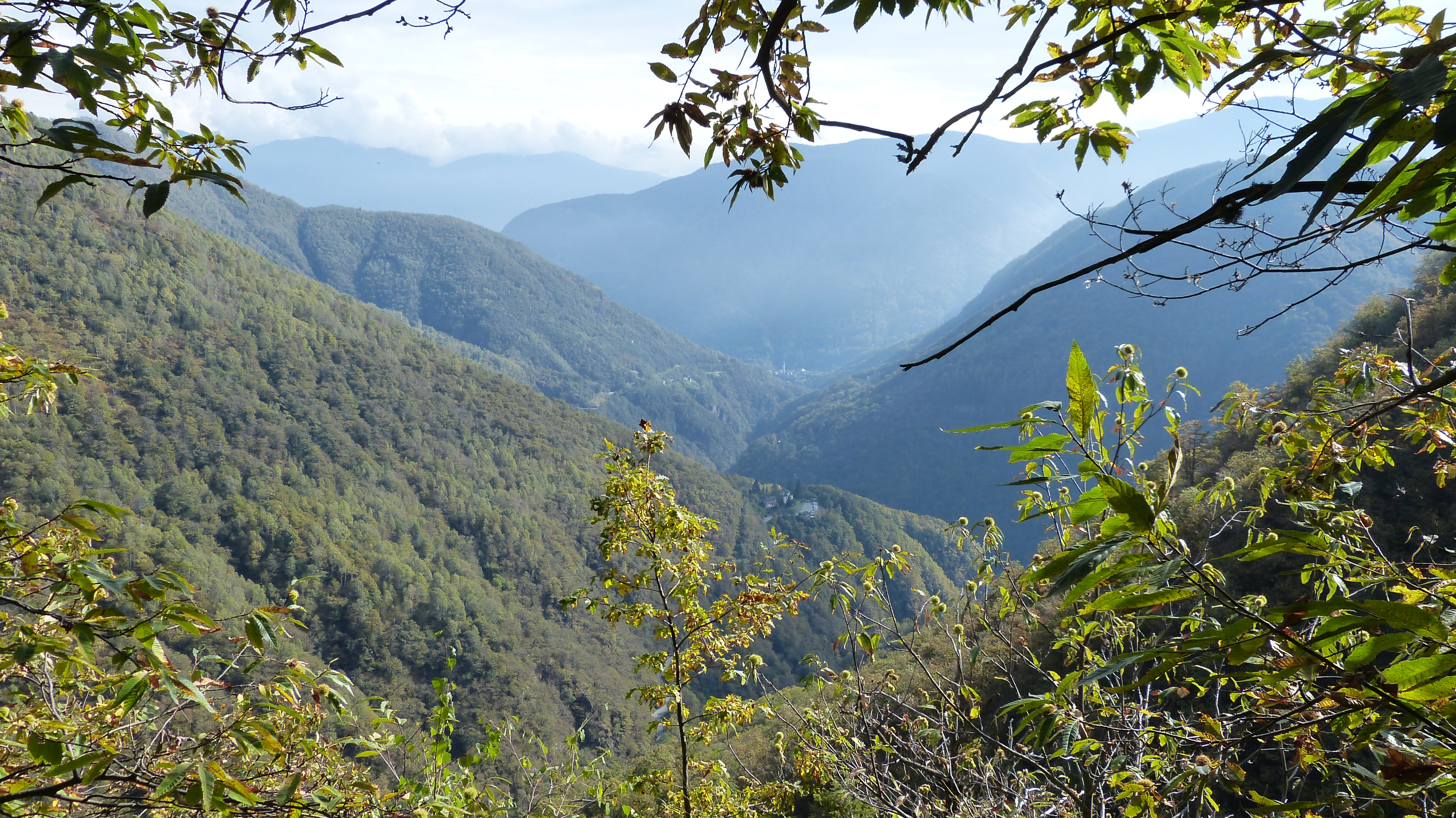
- Onsernone Valley
- Area: 11.5 sq mi (30 km^{2})

Naming
- Native name: Valle Onsernone (Italian)

Geography
- Location: Ticino, Switzerland
- Borders on: Valle Maggia and Valle Verzasca (east), Valle di Vergeletto (north), Centovalli (south), and the Ossola Valley in Italy (west)
- Coordinates: 46.200°N 8.617°E
- Interactive map of Onsernone Valley

The Onsernone Valley (Italian: Valle Onsernone, German: Onsernonetal), is one of the principal valleys of the Locarno District, in the Swiss Canton of Ticino. The Onsernone Valley derives its name from the Onsernone River, the name used in Italy for what the Swiss call the Isorno, of which it is a river valley. As of 10 April 2016, the municipality of Onsernone is larger than the Valley of Onsernone because Vergeletto and Gresso in the neighboring Valley of Vergeletto were merged into it.

The permanent population of the Onsernone Valley peaked in the 19th century along with local rye straw processing. Relatively undeveloped compared to the rest of Switzerland and with only one road in or out, the Onsernone Valley is often described as "wild," "untamed," and "mysterious" in tourist descriptions. In 2018, the residents of the area voted down a proposal to create a national park in Onsernone out of concern it would usher in a slough of government regulations and bring mass tourism that would end the laid-back lifestyle for which the area is known.

== Settlements ==
The villages and settlements in the Onsernone Valley, all of which belong to the larger municipality of Onsernone, include:

- Auressio
- Berzona
- Comologno
- Crana
- Isorno
- Loco
- Mosogno
- Russo
- Spruga

== Photos of the Onsernone Valley ==
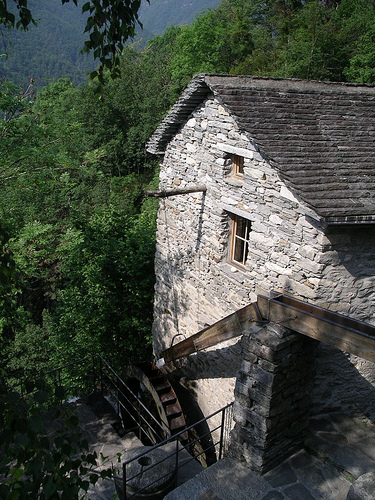
Old Mill in the village of Loco (2010)

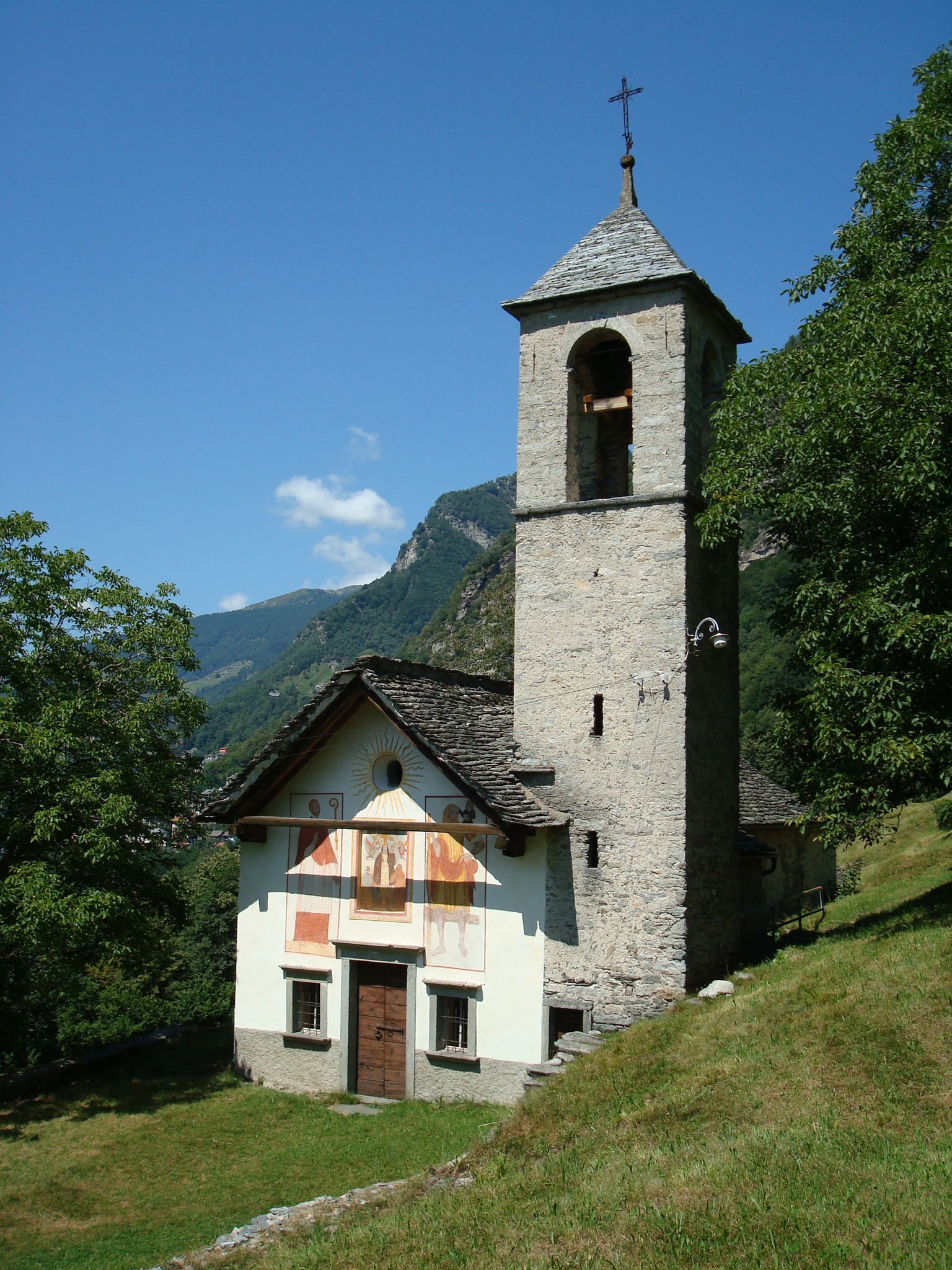
Bairone Chapel in Mosogno (2008)

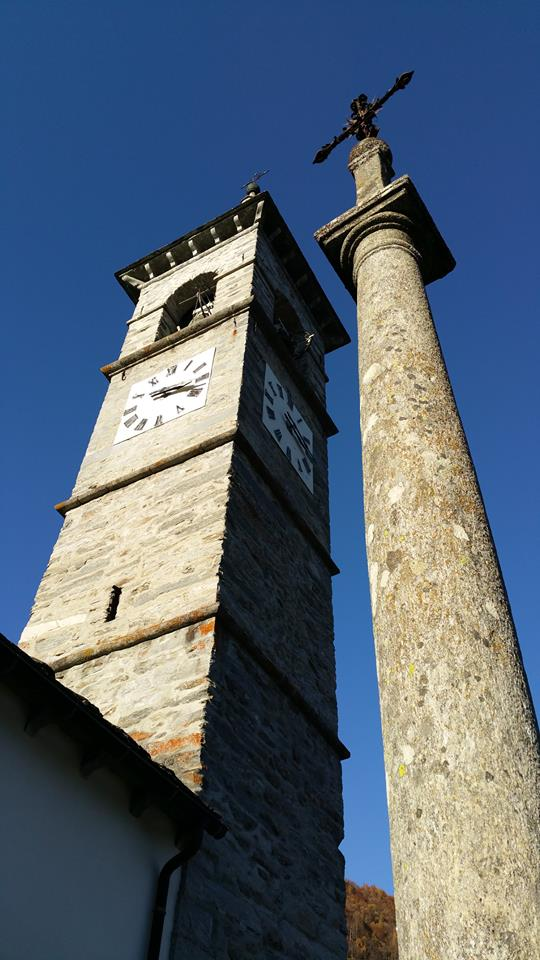
Bell tower and obelisk of Comologno (2017)

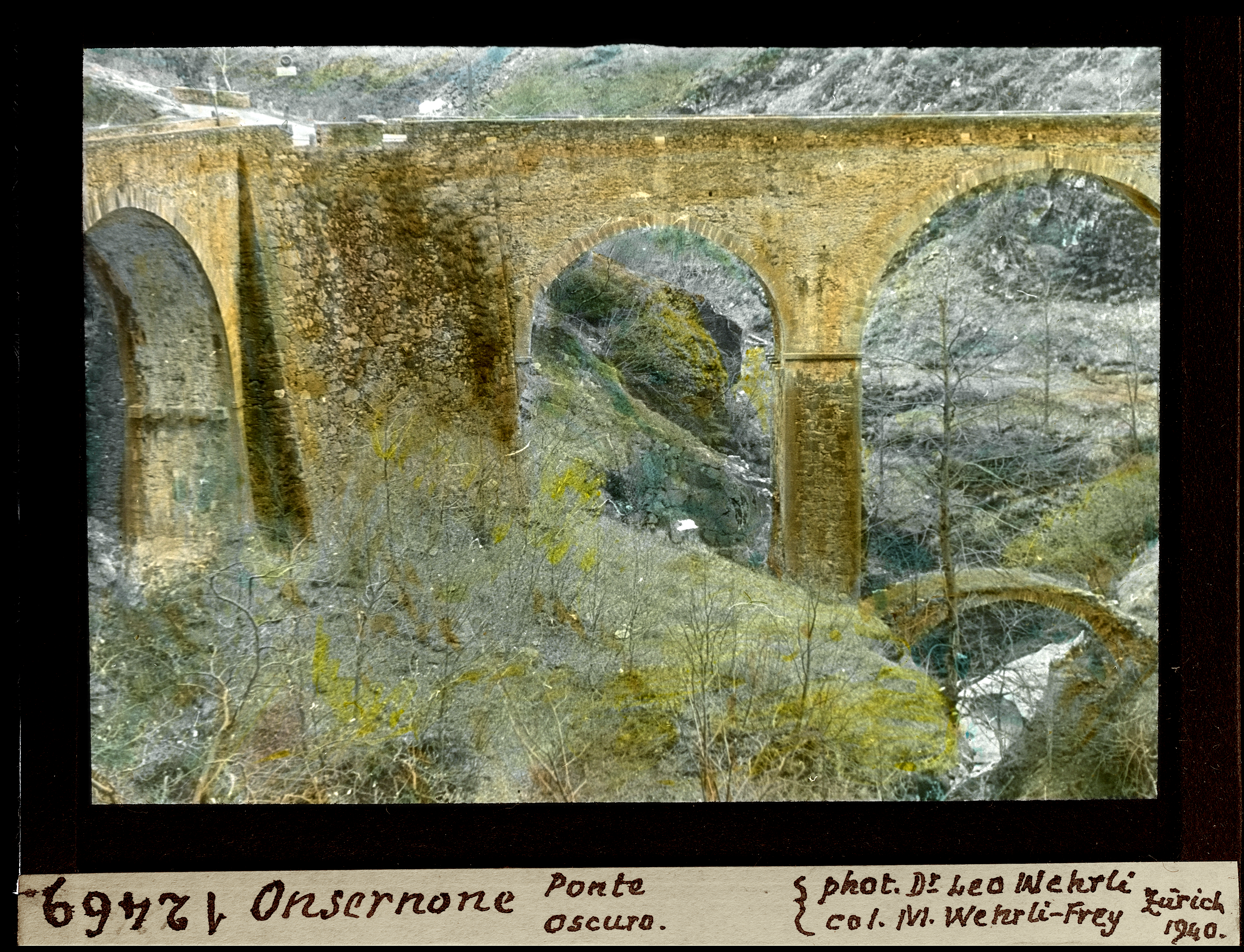
Historic (1940) photo of the Oscuro Bridge in Onsernone by Leo Wehrli, colorized by Margit Wehrli-Frey

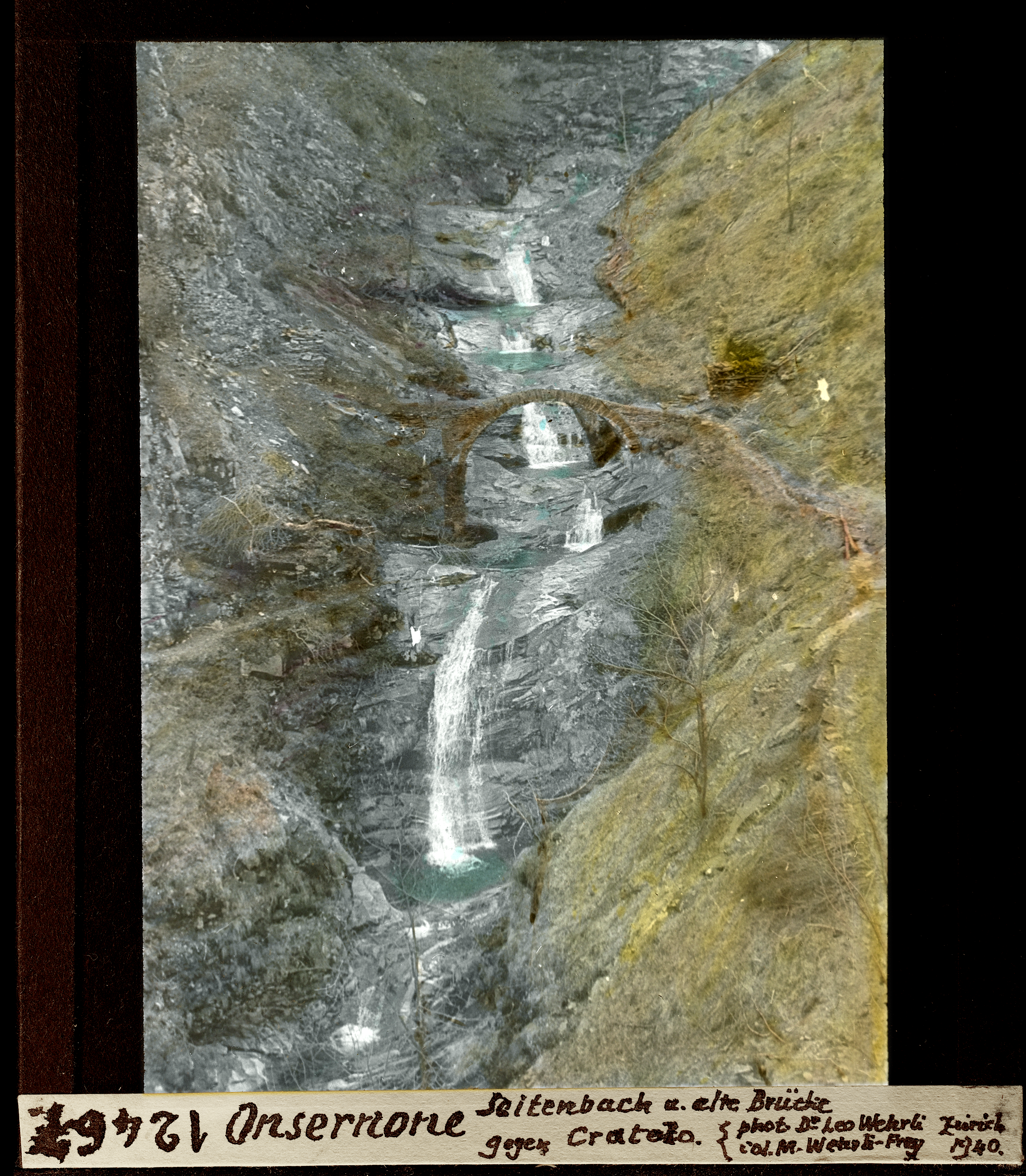
Historic photo (1940) of lateral stream and old bridge near Cratello by Leo Wehrli, colorized by Margit Wehrli-Frey

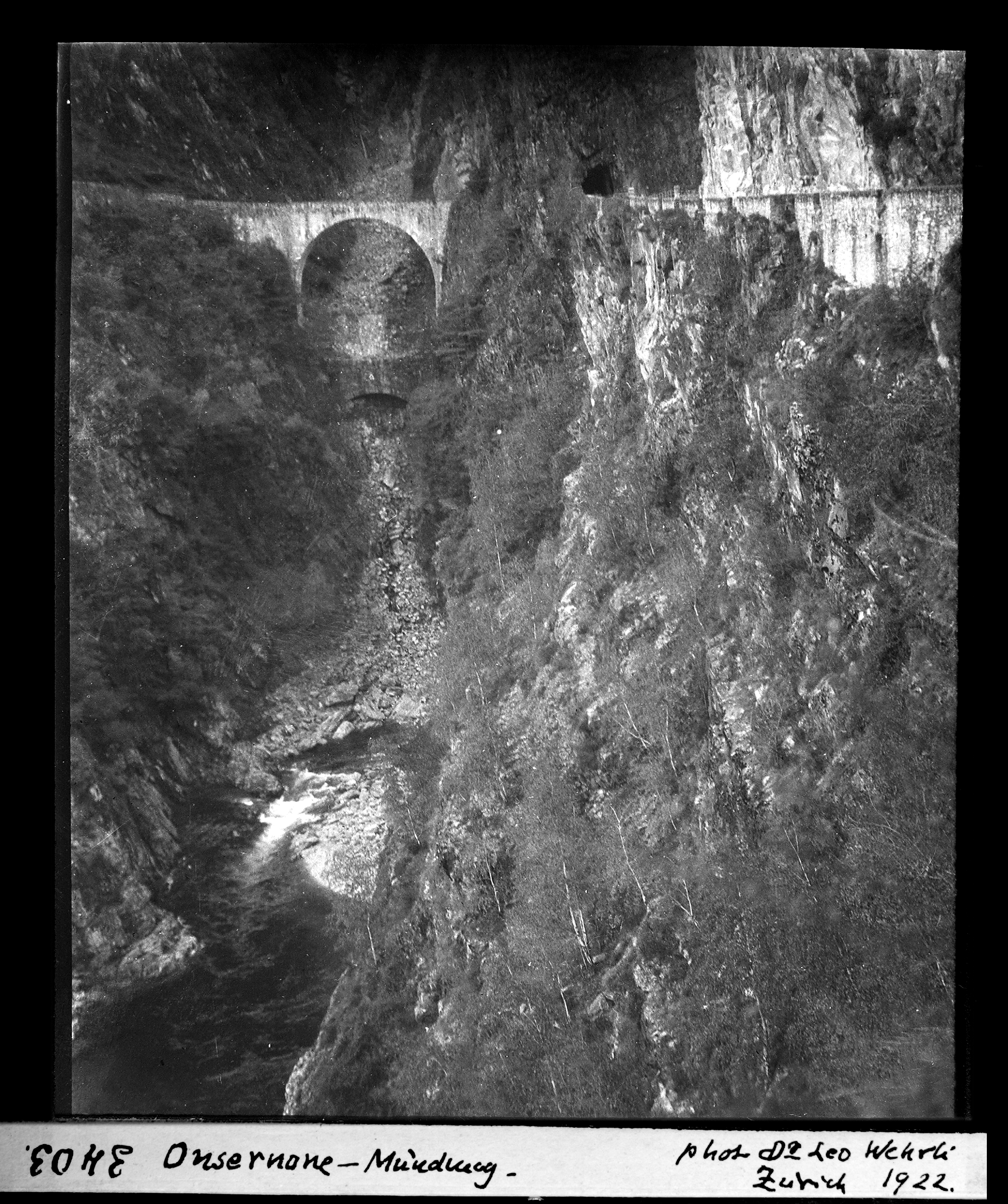
Mouth of the Onsernone/Isorno river (1922). Photo by Leo Wehrli

Leo Wehrli, Oscuro Bridge (1930?)

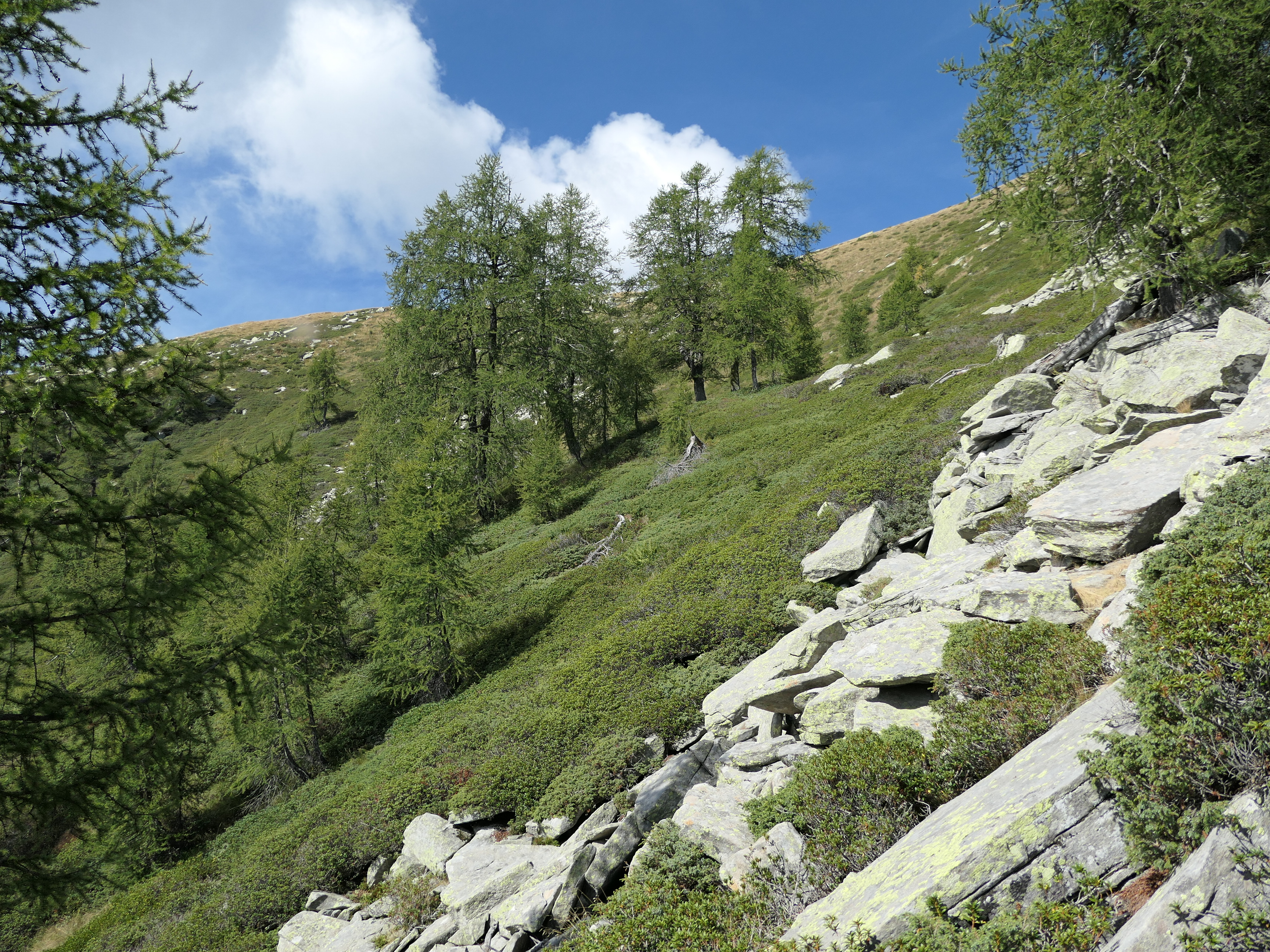
Subalpine forest in Onsernone (2022)

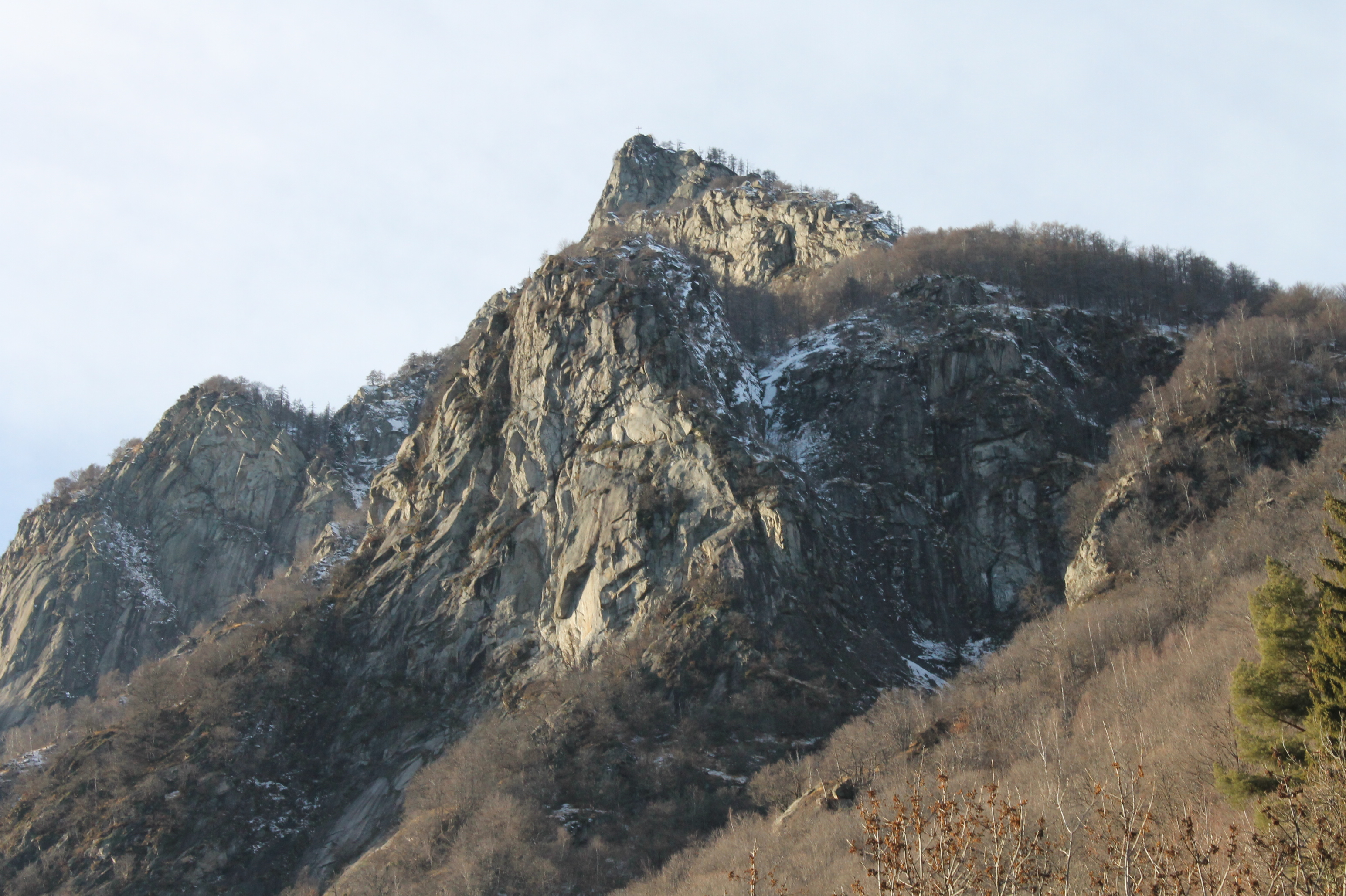
Pizzo della Croce (Peak of the cross)

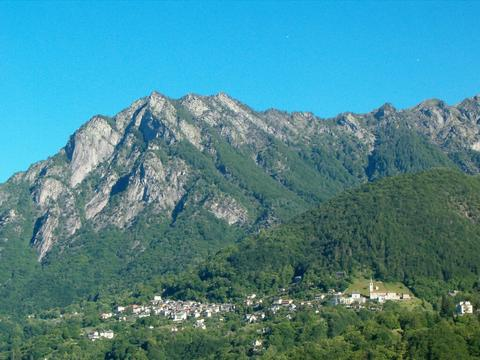
Onsernone Valley near Loco
