= Bagni di Craveggia =

- Frazione
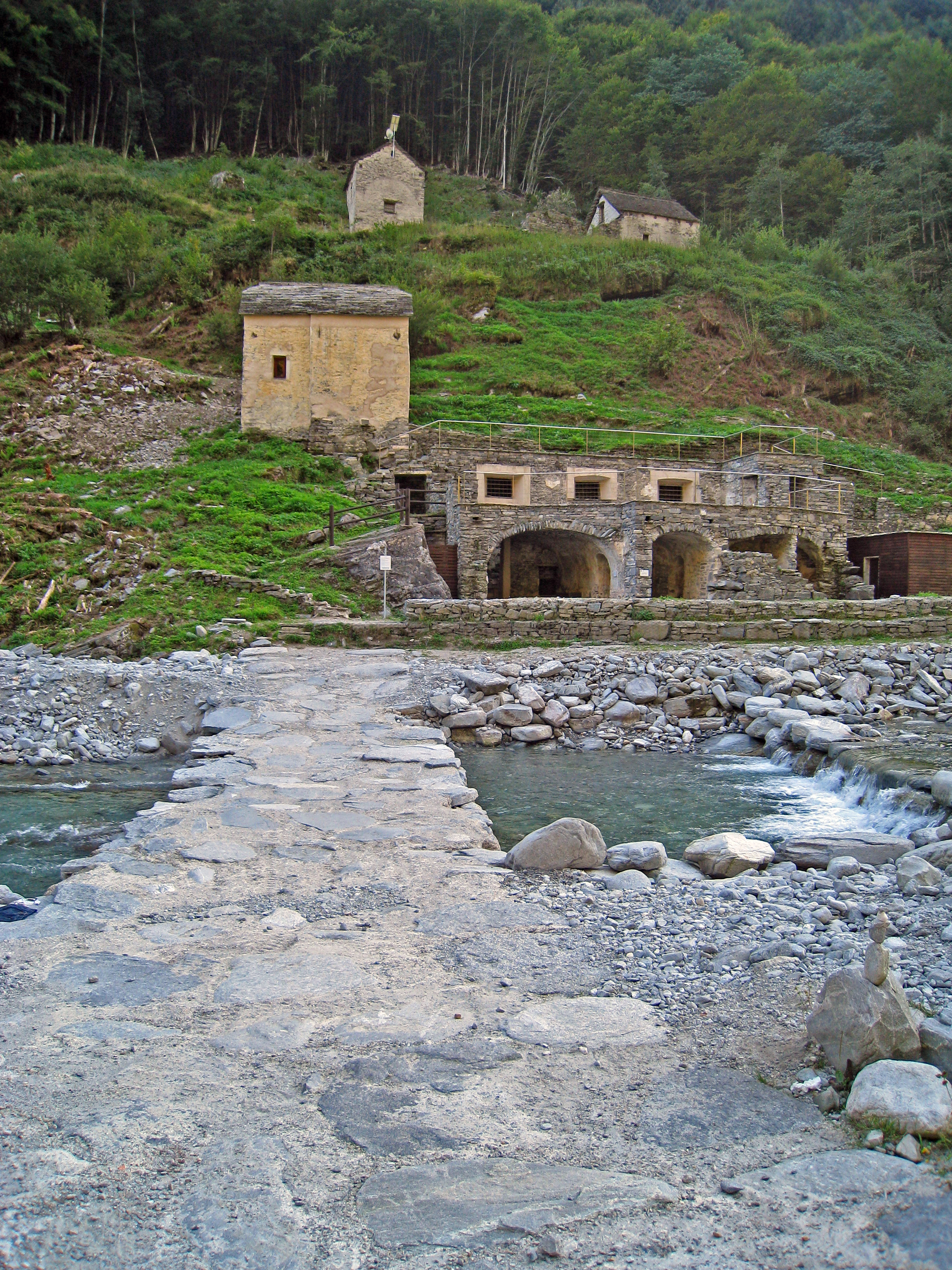
- Bagni di Craveggia as seen from the Swiss border

- Location of Bagni di Craveggia in Italy
- Coordinates: 46°11′54″N 8°32′22″E
- Country: Italy
- Region: Piedmont
- Province: Verbano-Cusio-Ossola (VB)
- Comune: Craveggia
- Elevation: 986 m (3,235 ft)
- Time zone: UTC+1 (CET)
  - Summer (DST): UTC+2 (CEST)
- Postal code: 28852
- Dialing code: (+39) 0324

Bagni di Craveggia is a frazione of the municipality of Craveggia, in Piedmont, northern Italy. It is located in the Onsernone Valley at 986 m (3,235 ft), on the border of Switzerland. Road access is through Spruga, a village in the municipality of Onsernone, which lies across the Isorno river. It owes its name to a source of thermal water at 28 °C (82 °F).

== History ==
=== Early mentions ===
Bagni di Craveggia was mentioned for the first time indirectly in the phrase "flumen de aqua calida" (warm water flow) on 11 January 1299 on the occasion of a land cession to the Locarnese Orelli family of recorded in Toceno. Obviously, the thermal springs had been known in the region for a long time. The first direct mention can be found in a document from Craveggia from 1352, which speaks of the healing properties of water in rachitic and lymphatic diseases. Another mention followed in 1406.

=== Territorial changes ===
For centuries, Bagni di Craveggia belonged to the Comune di Onsernone, which dates back to the High Middle Ages and has been a federal subject area (Ennetbergische Vogteien) since the late Middle Ages. From this community in the farthest part of Valle Onsernone, limited pasture and corresponding passage rights to the municipality of Craveggia have been granted since 1406. The right of felling in the forests still the sovereignty (confirmed in the contract of the two municipalities of 31 October 1767).

In 1806/1807, however, following the turmoil caused by the French invasion of Switzerland, the furthest end of the Onsernone Valley (where the Bagni are located) was ceded to the Kingdom of Italy, a client state of the French Empire. The definitive Italian-Swiss border treaty was drawn up in the chapel of Acquacalda in 1807 (Convenzione d’Acquacalda, including the final settlement of the claims of the Italian community of Dissimo, which today belongs to the community of Re in Valle Vigezzo).

=== Thermal hotel and World War II ===
In 1819, a six-story hotel with thermal facilities was built at the thermal spring belonging to the municipality of Craveggia. Although it was the only significant thermal spring in the area, inconvenient access slowed down the development of the thermal resort. The thermal guests, including those from Italy, usually traveled via Locarno in Switzerland to Comologno in an eight-hour carriage ride before they had to cover the last three to four kilometers through Spruga with their luggage on mules or on foot on a mule track. The extension of the road from Comologno to the thermal baths, which the Italian municipality of Craveggia was striving for, only met with limited hearing from the Ticino authorities in the 1930s, when the footpath was upgraded to a fourth-class road. Until today, the road is only publicly accessible to Spruga.

Towards the end of World War II, Bagni di Craveggia belonged to the partisan republic of Ossola. On 18 and 19 October 1944, the battle of the Bagni di Craveggia took place here, a border incident between German-Italian fascists, who were pursuing fleeing partisans, and the Swiss Army.

In the Winter of Terror, an avalanche fell from the north (Swiss side) on the Bagni and almost completely destroyed it; only the basement of the bath building and the slightly higher chapel remained. Further damage occurred on the occasion of the storm of 1978. After an Italian hydropower project that had not been implemented, two new pools (one with river water and one with thermal water) and two new tubs (refillable with thermal water) were opened on 1 August 2015.
