= Aline Valangin =

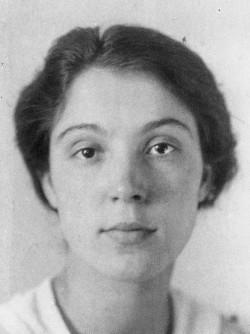
- Born: 1889; Vevey, Switzerland
- Died: 1986 (aged 96–97); Ascona
- Occupations: writer, pianist, psychoanalyst
- Writing career
- Period: 1900

Aline Valangin was a Swiss writer, pianist, and psychoanalyst. She was follower of Carl Jung.

Together with Vladimir Rosenbaum (1894–1984, her husband from 1917 to 1940) in Comologno, she helped and played host to migrant writers like Ignazio Silone, Ernst Toller, and Kurt Tucholsky.

In 1931, she fell in love with Silone while reading what became his masterpiece, the novel Fontamara, and helping him publish it.

She was later married to Russian-born Swiss composer Wladimir Vogel.

== Works ==
- Dictées (Gedichte), éditions Sagesse, Paris 1936
- Geschichten vom Tal, Girsberger, Zürich 1937
- L'Amande clandestine (Gedichte), éditions GLM, Paris 1939
- Tessiner Novellen, Girsberger, Zürich 1939
- Die Bargada. Eine Chronik, Büchergilde Gutenberg, Zürich 1940
- Casa Conti. Roman, Hallwag, Bern 1941
- Victoire oder Die letzte Rose. Roman, Steinberg, Zürich 1946
- Reflets (Gedichte), écrivains réunis, Lyon 1956
- Raum ohne Kehrreim / Espace sans refrain. Gedichte. Mit drei Scherenschnitten von Hans Arp, Tschudy (Die Quadrat-Bücher 23), St. Gallen 1961
- Traumschalmei. Göttinnen – Einkehr – Der Stylit. Gedichte, Karlsruher Bote, Karlsruhe 1969
- Tagebuch aus Israel. Gedichte, Karlsruher Bote, Karlsruhe 1970
- Aussagen. Gedichte, Karlsruher Bote, Karlsruhe 1971
- Vers et revers (Gedichte), Latvia, o.O. 1978
- Die Silberflöte. Zwei psychologische Tessiner Novellen, Sisyphos, Zürich 1980
- Dorf an der Grenze, Limmat, Zürich 1982
