= Onsernone =

- Municipality
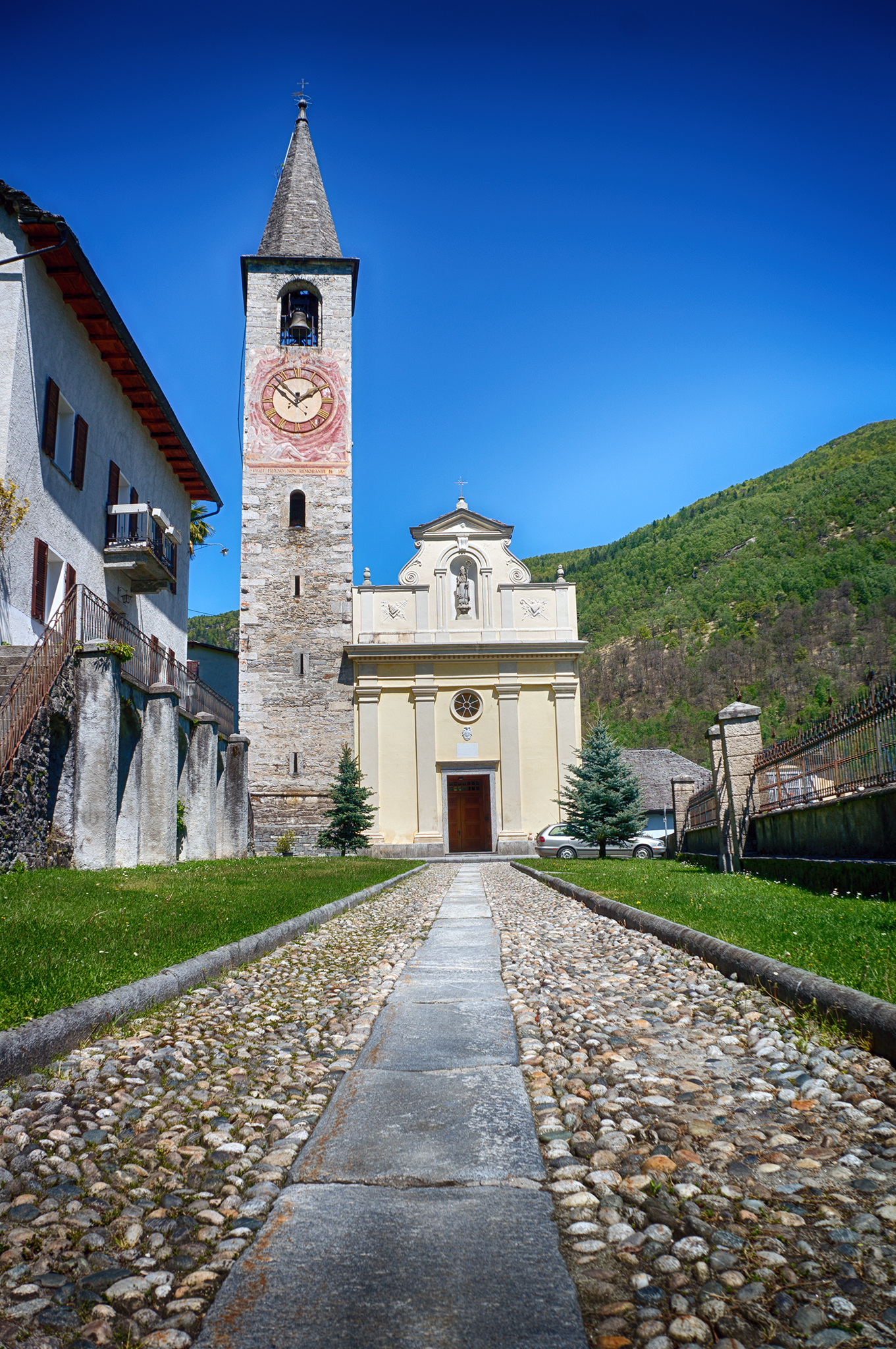
- Onsernone

- Flag Coat of arms
- Location of Onsernone
- Location within Switzerland Location within Canton of Ticino
- Coordinates: 46°12′N 8°37′E
- Country: Switzerland
- Canton: Ticino
- District: Locarno

Government
  - Mayor: Sindaco

Area
  - Total: 29.86 km^{2} (11.53 sq mi)
- Elevation: 802 m (2,631 ft)

Population (December 2004)
  - Total: 290
  - Density: 9.7/km^{2} (25/sq mi)
- Time zone: UTC+01:00 (CET)
  - Summer (DST): UTC+02:00 (CEST)
- Postal code: 6662
- SFOS number: 5136
- ISO 3166 code: CH-TI
- Localities: Comologno, Vocaglia, Corbella, Cappellino, Spruga, Crana, Russo, Isorno, Vergeletto, Gresso, Mosogno
- Surrounded by: Terre di Pedemonte, Centovalli, Craveggia (IT-VB), Maggia, Re (IT-VB),
- Website: http://www.onsernone.swiss SFSO statistics

Onsernone is a municipality in the Swiss canton of Ticino, near the city of Locarno. The river Isorno, known as the Onsernone River in Italy, runs through the valley with which Onsernone shares its name.

The municipality was created in 1995 by a merger of Comologno, Crana and Russo.

On 10 April 2016 the former municipalities of Vergeletto, Gresso, Mosogno and Isorno merged into Onsernone.

== History ==
Comologno is first mentioned in 1438 as Comolognium. Crana is first mentioned in 1228 as Grana and in 1265 it was mentioned as Crana. Russo is first mentioned in 1231 as de Ruxi. In 1277 it was mentioned as Rusio.

Isorno was formed in 2001 by a merger of Auressio, Berzona and Loco.

=== Comologno ===
During the Ancien Régime, Comologno belonged to the Squadra of Crana, which together with the other villages of the valley (with the exception of Auressio) formed the medieval municipality of Onsernone. With the establishment of the Canton of Ticino in 1803, Comologno became an independent municipality.

Comologno formed an independent parish in 1715, when it separated from Russo. The parish church of San Giovanni Battista, was built in 1668–1697.

With the emergence and development of rye straw processing in the 19th century, the population of Comologno increased rapidly. However, in the following century, the decline of farming, animal husbandry and straw craft led to a rapid population decline. Most of the working population works in industrial or service enterprises in the valley or commute to work in the agglomeration of Locarno. Many residents emigrated to other countries in search of work. Several families became wealthy in foreign countries, and used that wealth to build stately mansions in Comologno. The largest is from the Remonda family, who in the second half of the 18th century, became wealthy in France. Another notable mansion is the Palazzo (or Castello) della Barca which was acquired in the 1930s by Vladimir Rosenbaum for his wife Aline Valangin, a writer and artist. It soon became a haven for artists and well-known anti-fascists, including Ignazio Silone, Ernesto Rossi, Kurt Tucholsky, Hans Marchwitza, Ernesto Bonaiuti, Max Terpis, Elias Canetti, Wladimir Vogel and Jean-Paul Samson. Since the early 1970s, at the suggestion of the Associazione Amici di Comologno, various artists have decorated houses in the village with frescos.

=== Crana ===
During the Ancien Régime, Crana belonged to the Squadra of Crana which included the territory of Vocaglia, Comologno and Spruga, and was part of the old municipality of Onsernone. The modern village was created during the institutional changes of the Act of Mediation in 1803. Crana is known for the over 5,000 holders of heimatrecht in the village. The heimatrecht is similar to place of birth in other countries, and the heimatort is used on Swiss passports. A person maintains their heimatort regardless of whether they have ever lived in the municipality. The reason for the high number of heimatrecht holders is that the village sold the heimatrecht, which conferred local citizenry (and thus Swiss citizenship) to help make up for the low village income.

The parish was created in 1787 when the village split away from the Russo parish. The Church of SS Peter and Paul was built in 1676.

The present population is made up of retirees and commuters who work in the Onsernone valley and in the agglomeration of Locarno.

=== Russo ===
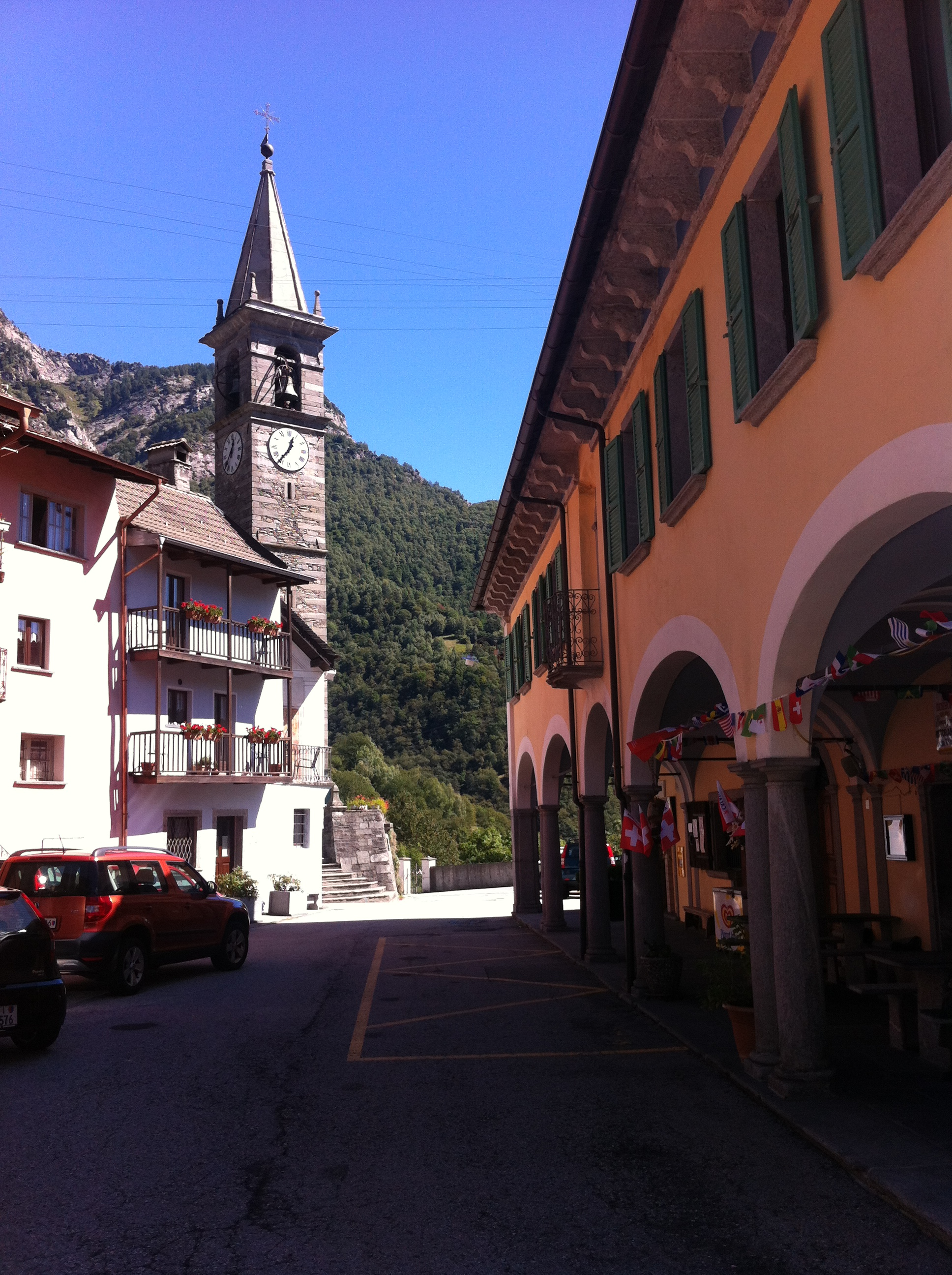
Village center of Russo

During the Ancien Régime, Russo belonged to the Squadra of Russo, part of the old municipality of Onsernone.

The parish was probably created in 1656, when it separated from Loco. It included Comologno until 1715, Vergeletto until 1757, and Crana until 1787. The parish church of S. Maria Assunta is first mentioned in 1365, and was renovated in 1995–2002.

Until about the mid-20th century, agriculture, animal husbandry and straw plaiting were the main sources of income in the village. This was supplemented by the traditional seasonal migration. While the number of inhabitants had decreased consistently over the decades, it began increasing in the 1970s. In 1989, the opening of the Centro sociale onsernonese nursing home provided a few dozen jobs in the village.

=== Vergeletto ===
In the Middle Ages Vergeletto belonged to the Onsernone Vicinanza and to the squadra of Russo. In 1803 the municipality of Vergeletto also included the municipality of Gresso, both municipalities separated into independent municipalities in 1882. Vergeletto was part of the parish of Russo until 1757, when it became an autonomous parish.

=== Gresso ===
The discovery of a Roman tomb from the 1st-2nd Century AD, with pottery and coins, proves that Gresso was part of the outer-most reaches of the Vicus of Muralto. The modern village of Gresso is first mentioned in 1316 as Agrassio. Until 1803, Gresso was part of the Squadra of Russo, one of five Squadre, that formed the medieval community of Onsernone.

The village church has always been part of the parish of Vergeletto. The Chapel of S. Orsola was built in 1703 and rebuilt in 1730. It was renovated in the late 20th century.

The village didn't have a drivable road until 1885. The local economy was based on agriculture, animal husbandry, and, for a time, emigration. Most of the population is elderly, the few younger residents have either moved away or commute to Locarno.

=== Mosogno ===
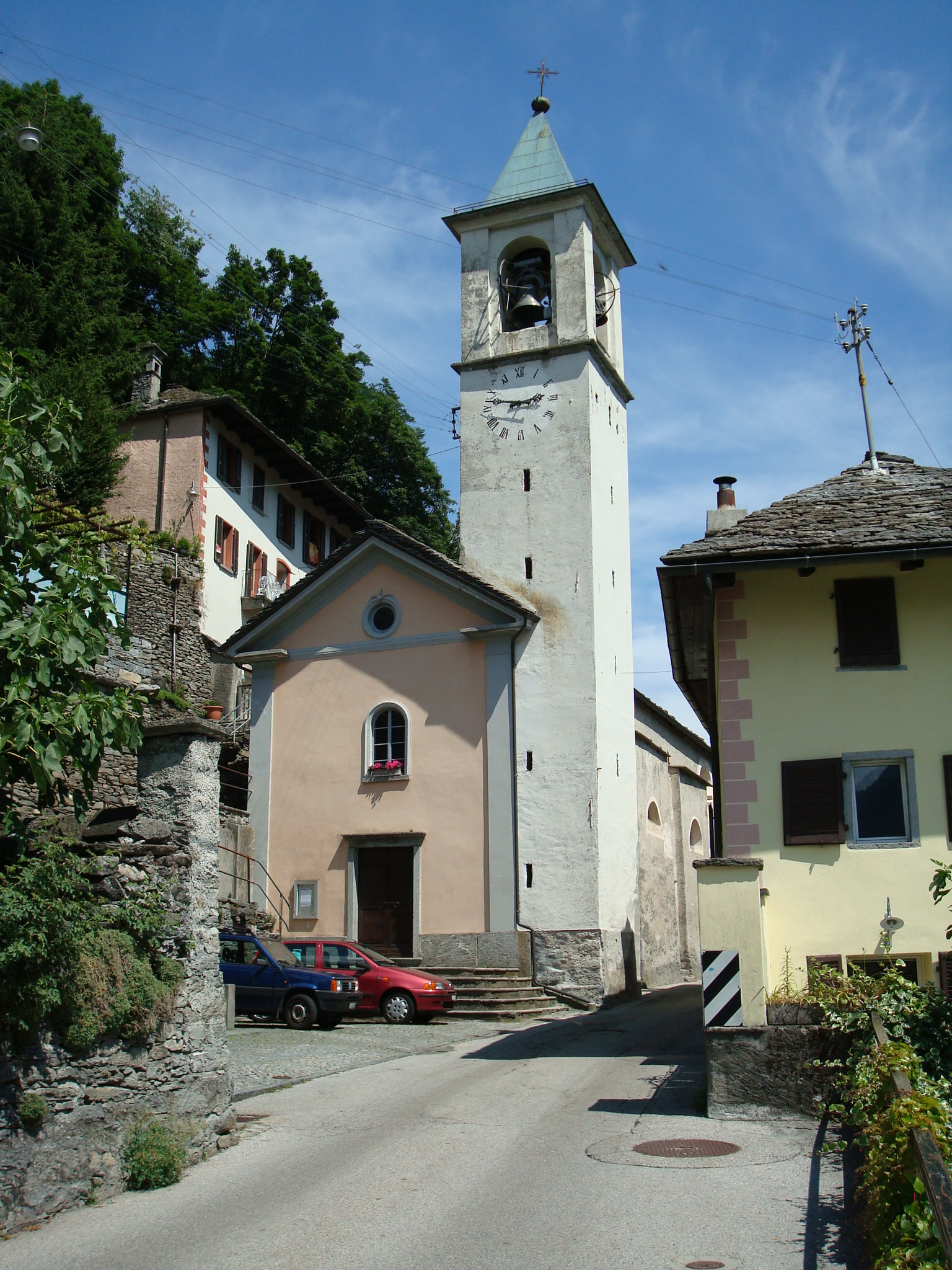
Parish church of S. Bernardo in Mosogno

Mosogno is first mentioned in 1277 as Mosogno. In 1352 it was mentioned as Muxognio. In the Middle Ages, it was one of the five Squadre that made up the community of Onsernone. It became an independent municipality in 1803.

The church of S. Bernardo was built along the road in 1596. It became parish church and center of its own parish after it separated from Loco in 1685. The settlement of Mosogno Sotto has had the Chapel St. Maria Addolorata since 1684. In 1657 the chapel of S. Maria della Natività was built in Bairon, while in Chiosso the chapel of S. Giacomo was built in the second half of the 17th century.

The decline of the straw factory, emigration and recent migration to urban centers, have led to a steady decline in population since the late 19th century.

=== Auressio ===
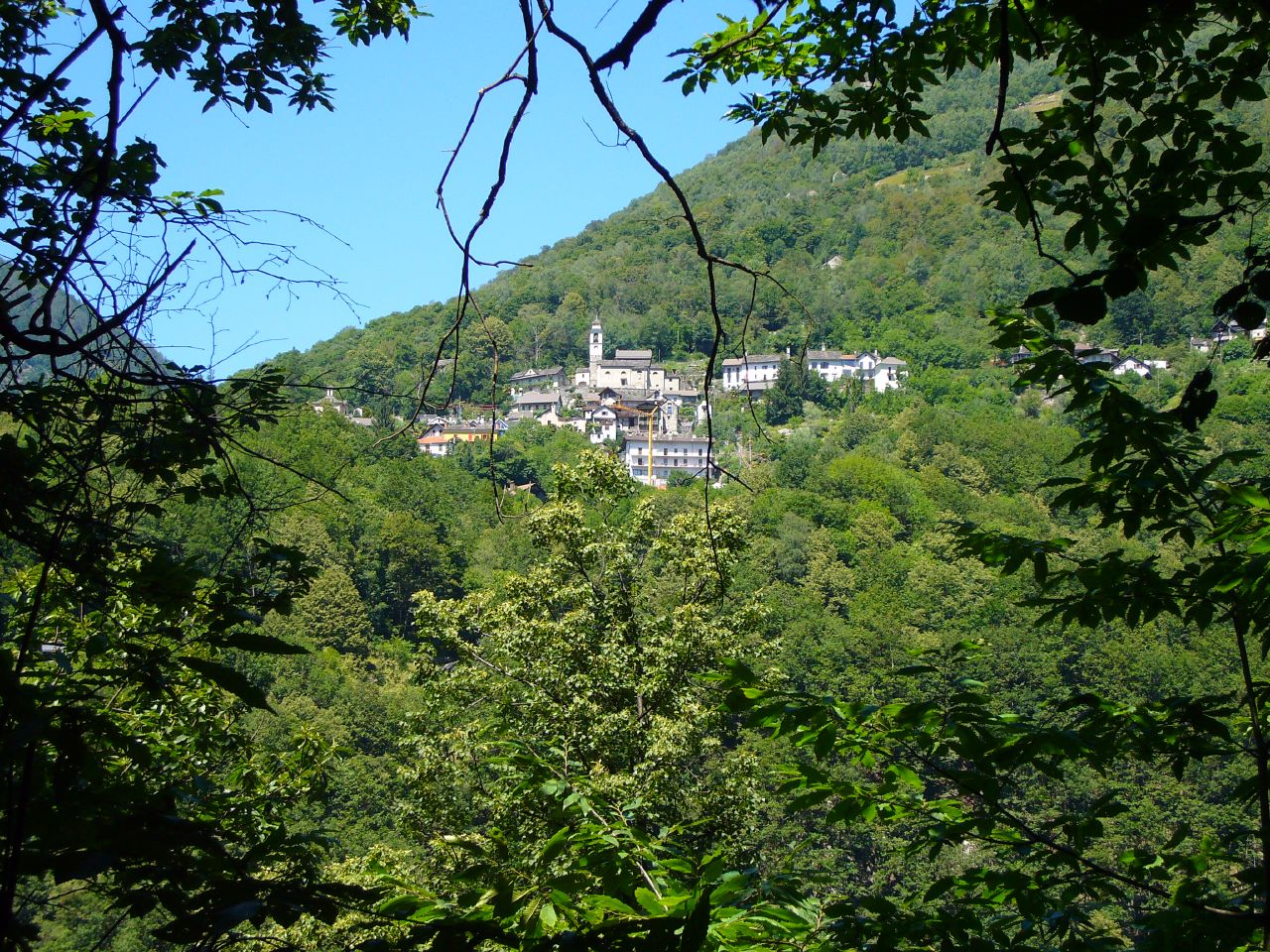
Auressio village

Auressio is first mentioned in 1233 as Oraxio.

Until the 19th century, the village had much closer ties to Piedmont than to the rest of the Onsernone valley. The construction of the road through the valley in the 19th century brought it closer to the rest of the valley.

The church of S. Antonio Abate was finished in 1526 and became the center of an independent parish in 1792 after it separated from Loco.

After World War II farming and grazing were almost abandoned and replaced by short-term, seasonal emigration. The improved transport links to the nearby town of Locarno increased Auressio's attractiveness as a place to live for those that were employed in Locarno. This led to a clear population increase in recent years.

One notable building in Auressio is the Villa Edera, which was built in 1887, for the Paris impresario Paolo Antonio Calzonio. It was restored in the early 1990s by the municipality and is now used as a hostel.

=== Berzona ===
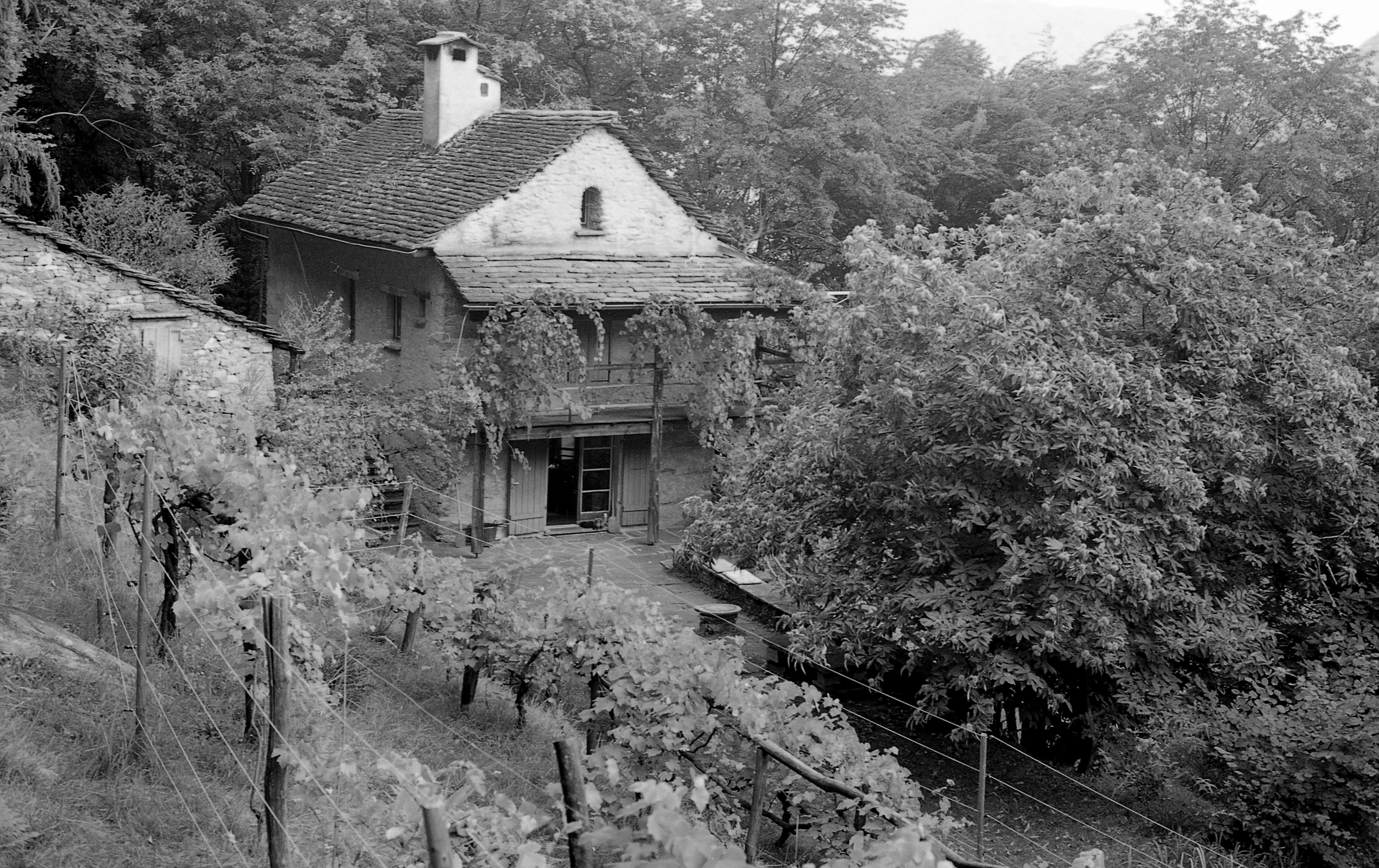
House near Berzona

Berzona is first mentioned in 1265 as Berzona.

The village section of Seghelina is located directly on the main road, while the main village of Berzona is above the road. During the Middle Ages it was part of the Squadra of Onsernone.

The church of S. Defendente was built in 1564 and became a parish church when it separated from Loco in 1777. The section of Seghelina has the chapels of Santa Maria (1682) and S. Maria Lauretana (1766). The political municipality was created at the same time as the Canton of Ticino in 1803.

After World War II, much of the village population emigrated and sold their properties to outsiders. Many people who bought houses in Berzona were well known personalities from the arts and culture, such as Alfred Andersch, Golo Mann and Max Frisch. Today, the village is shrinking as few jobs in farming and grazing remain and most of the working population have moved to Locarno.

=== Loco ===
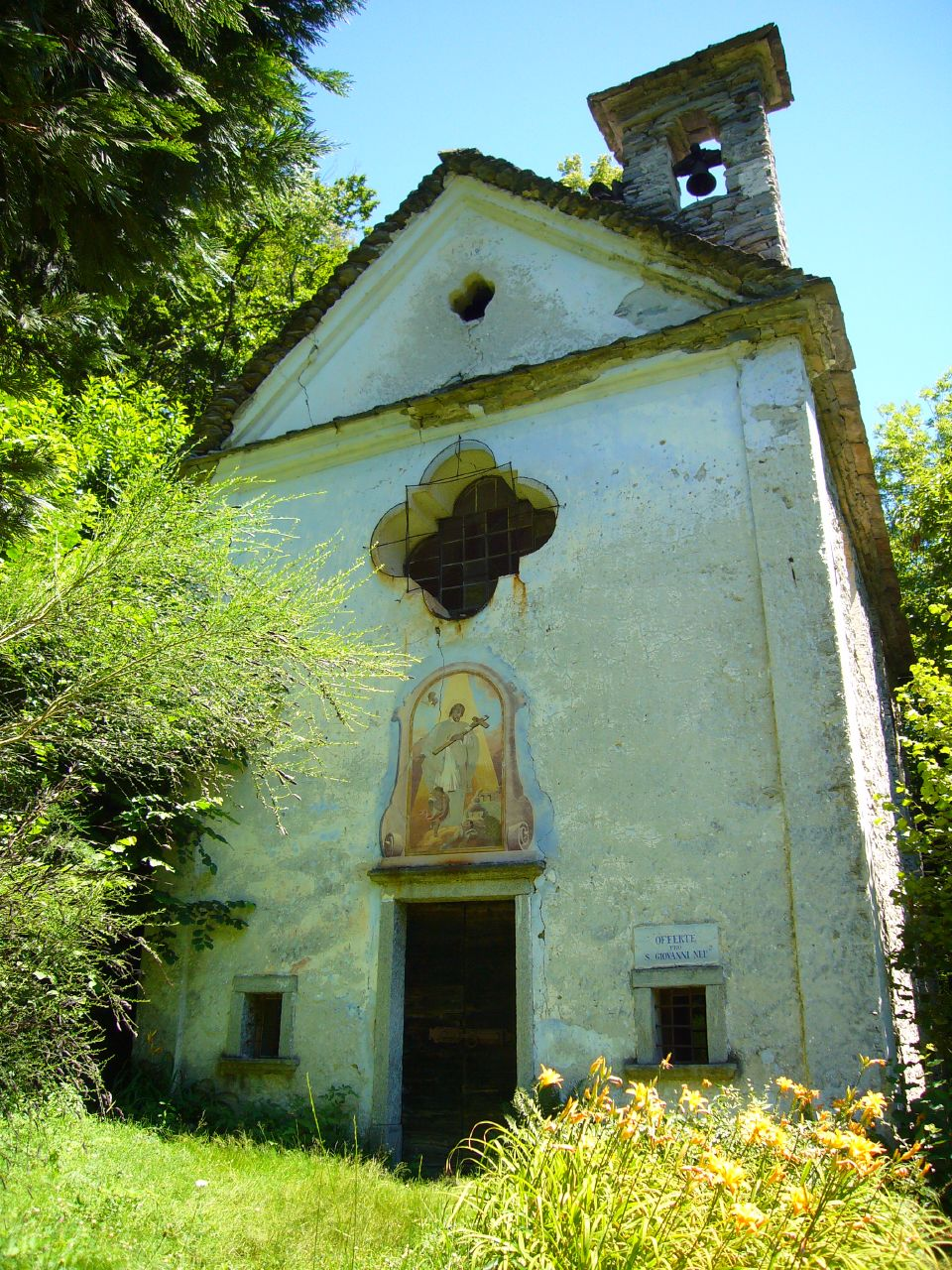
Chapel of St. John Nepomuk

Loco is first mentioned in 1224 as Loco and was also known as Luogo.

Loco also contained the hamlets of Niva and Rossa.

From the Middle Ages until the end of the Ancien Régime Loco was the capital of the old Onsernone valley community.

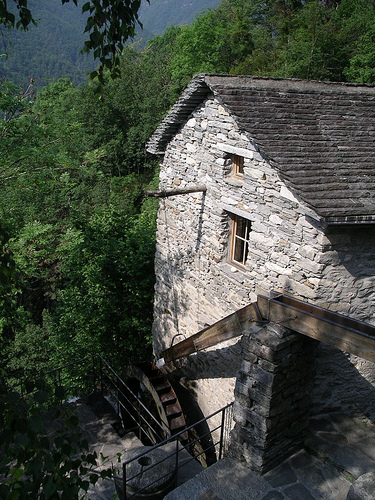
Historic old mill of Loco, now a museum

The parish church of San Remigio was the mother church of the valley and ancient seat of the Vicariate of Onsernone valley. It is first mentioned in 1228 (in the municipal archives), but is probably older. In the early 16th century it was rebuilt and acquired its current steeple. It houses the Holy Cross chapel with an ancient, venerated cross relic. The church is also the home of a Last Supper painting by the Flemish painter Godefridus Maes from 1683. In the hamlet of Niva, there is a late baroque chapel of St. John Nepomuk. The chapel in Sassello is from the late 17th century and is dedicated to the Madonna of Re.

In the 19th century, Loco was a center of the straw braiding for hats, bags and other articles. The straw braids that were used for this purpose were produced in the other villages of the Onsernone valley.

In addition to the typical houses with balconies, a number of aristocratic mansions are located in the village. These include the Casa Broggini (built 1708) in Rossa.

The primary school for the area is located in Loco, along with the Onsernonese Museum (opened 1966) and the renovated retirement home of the Onsernone valley. Near Loco, in a restored mill, there is a permanent exhibition on the grain milling in the area. Casa Shira (built in the 19th century, now owned by the community) has a small public library and a hostel.

At the beginning of the 21st century, the majority of the workers commuted to Locarno.

== Geography ==
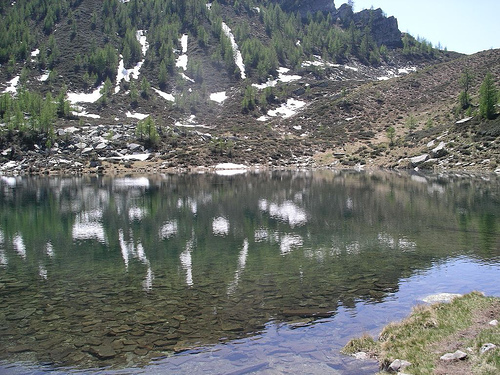
Salei lake near Vergeletto village

After the 2016 merger Onsernone had an area of 105.38 km^{2} (40.69 sq mi).

Before the 2016 merger, Onsernone had an area, (as of the 2004/09 survey) of 29.88 square kilometers (11.54 sq mi). Of this area, about 5.6% is used for agricultural purposes, while 83.3% is forested. Of the rest of the land, 1.4% is settled (buildings or roads) and 9.7% is unproductive land. Over the past two decades (1979/85-2004/09) the amount of land that is settled has increased by 3 ha (7.4 acres) and the agricultural land has decreased by 63 ha (160 acres).

The municipality is located in the Locarno district, in the lower Onsernone valley, about 25 km (16 mi) from Locarno. Before 2016, Onsernone consisted only of the villages of Comologno, Crana and Russo as well as the settlements of Vocaglia, Corbella, Cappellino and Spruga. That municipality was formed in 1995 from the three formerly independent villages. The drawn out merger process began in the 1970s.

== Demographics ==
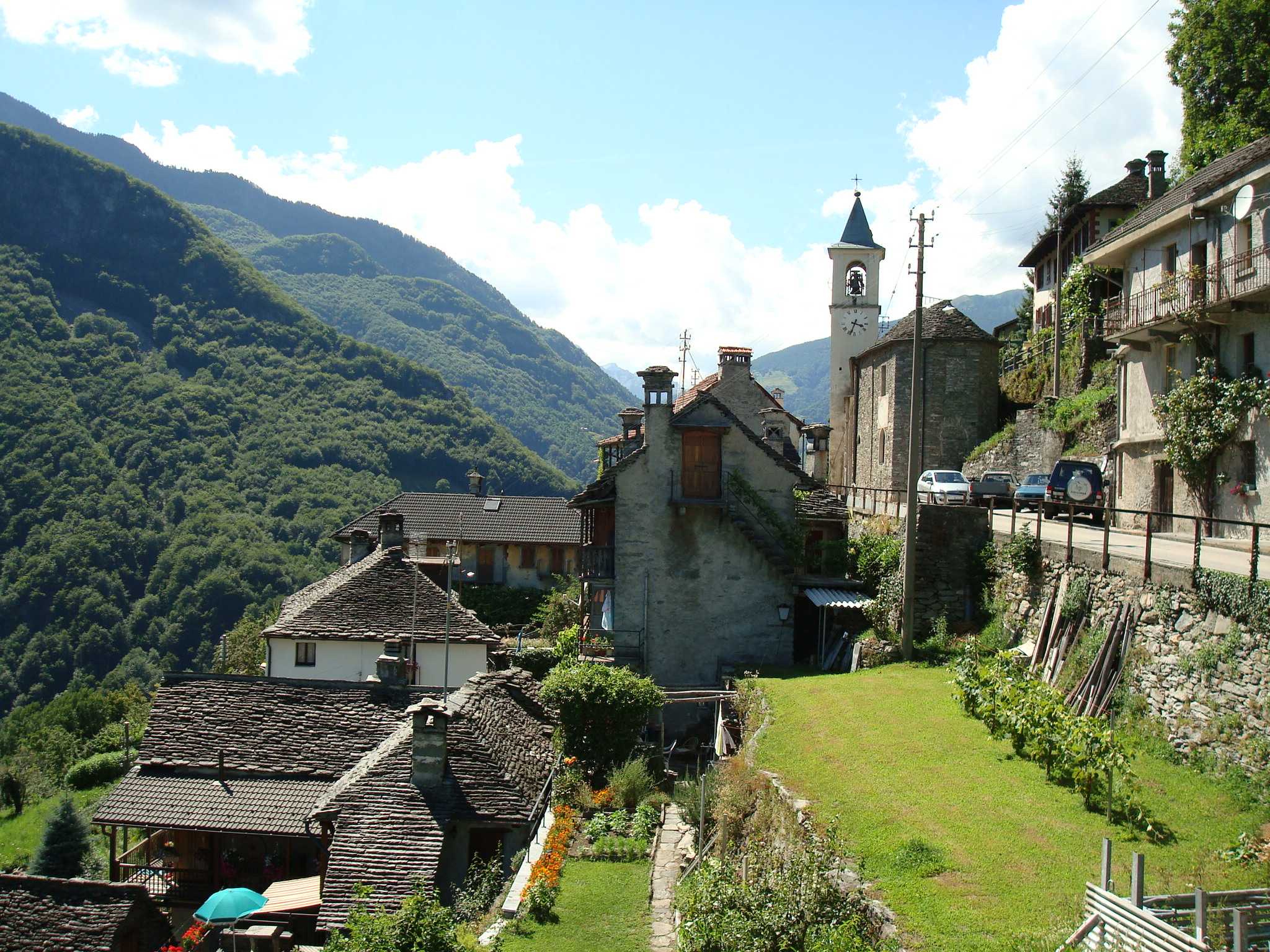
Center of Mosogno village

Onsernone has a population (as of December 2020) of 663. As of 2008, 5.1% of the population are resident foreign nationals. Over the last 10 years (1997–2007) the population has changed at a rate of -11.2%.

Most of the population (as of 2000) speaks Italian (79.5%), with German being second most common (14.9%) and French being third (4.0%). Of the Swiss national languages (as of 2000), 48 speak German, 13 people speak French, 256 people speak Italian. The remainder (5 people) speak another language.

As of 2008, the gender distribution of the population was 47.5% male and 52.5% female. The population was made up of 134 Swiss men (45.4% of the population), and 6 (2.0%) non-Swiss men. There were 145 Swiss women (49.2%), and 10 (3.4%) non-Swiss women.

In 2008 there were 5 deaths of Swiss citizens. Ignoring immigration and emigration, the population of Swiss citizens decreased by 5 while the foreign population remained the same. There was 1 non-Swiss man and 1 non-Swiss woman who immigrated from another country to Switzerland. The total Swiss population change in 2008 (from all sources, including moves across municipal borders) was an increase of 1 and the non-Swiss population change was a decrease of 2 people. This represents a population growth rate of -0.3%.

The age distribution, as of 2009, in Onsernone is; 14 children or 4.7% of the population are between 0 and 9 years old and 23 teenagers or 7.8% are between 10 and 19. Of the adult population, 30 people or 10.2% of the population are between 20 and 29 years old. 19 people or 6.4% are between 30 and 39, 34 people or 11.5% are between 40 and 49, and 61 people or 20.7% are between 50 and 59. The senior population distribution is 48 people or 16.3% of the population are between 60 and 69 years old, 34 people or 11.5% are between 70 and 79, there are 32 people or 10.8% who are over 80.

As of 2000, there were 147 private households in the municipality, and an average of 2 persons per household. In 2000 there were 337 single family homes (or 75.7% of the total) out of a total of 445 inhabited buildings. There were 61 two family buildings (13.7%) and 27 multi-family buildings (6.1%). There were also 20 buildings in the municipality that were multipurpose buildings (used for both housing and commercial or another purpose).

The vacancy rate for the municipality, in 2008, was 0.85%. In 2000 there were 582 apartments in the municipality. The most common apartment size was the 3 room apartment of which there were 150. There were 86 single room apartments and 90 apartments with five or more rooms. Of these apartments, a total of 147 apartments (25.3% of the total) were permanently occupied, while 429 apartments (73.7%) were seasonally occupied and 6 apartments (1.0%) were empty. As of 2007, the construction rate of new housing units was 0 new units per 1000 residents.

The historical population is given in the following tables:

Year	Population Comologno	Population Crana	Population Russo
1719	182	-	-
1795	253	134	206
1808	333	138	239
1850	440	185	302
1900	624	303	248
1950	477	134	121
1960	281	87	-
1970	-	-	84
1990	142	49	136
Onsernone
2000	322		

== Heritage sites of national significance ==
The Palazzo Della Barca and the Museo Onsernonese are listed as Swiss heritage site of national significance. The villages of Comologno, Russo, Gresso, Mosogno di sotto, Auressio, Berzona and Loco are part of the Inventory of Swiss Heritage Sites.

== Politics ==
In the 2011 federal election the most popular party was the SP with 36.0% of the vote. The next three most popular parties were the FDP (24.3%), the CVP (18.0%) and a party or parties listed as other (6.6%). In the federal election, a total of 120 votes were cast, and the voter turnout was 35.5%.

In the 2007 federal election the most popular party was the SP which received 29.95% of the vote. The next three most popular parties were the FDP (27%), the CVP (16.98%) and the SVP (12.62%). In the federal election, a total of 116 votes were cast, and the voter turnout was 30.3%.

In the 2007 Gran Consiglio election, there were a total of 312 registered voters in Onsernone, of which 131 or 42.0% voted. 1 blank ballot and 1 null ballot was cast, leaving 129 valid ballots in the election. The most popular party was the PS which received 44 or 34.1% of the vote. The next three most popular parties were; the PLRT (with 27 or 20.9%), the SSI (with 26 or 20.2%) and the LEGA (with 17 or 13.2%).

In the 2007 Consiglio di Stato election, 1 null ballot was cast, leaving 130 valid ballots in the election. The most popular party was the PS which received 43 or 33.1% of the vote. The next three most popular parties were; the PLRT (with 26 or 20.0%), the PLRT (with 26 or 20.0%) and the LEGA (with 22 or 16.9%).

== Economy ==
As of 2007, Onsernone had an unemployment rate of 3.18%. As of 2005, there were 13 people employed in the primary economic sector and about 7 businesses involved in this sector. 16 people were employed in the secondary sector and there were 3 businesses in this sector. 90 people were employed in the tertiary sector, with 13 businesses in this sector. There were 124 residents of the municipality who were employed in some capacity, of which females made up 32.3% of the workforce.

In 2000, there were 32 workers who commuted into the municipality and 44 workers who commuted away. The municipality is a net exporter of workers, with about 1.4 workers leaving the municipality for every one entering. About 12.5% of the workforce coming into Onsernone are coming from outside Switzerland. Of the working population, 6.5% used public transportation to get to work, and 50% used a private car. As of 2009, there was one hotel in Onsernone.

== Religion ==
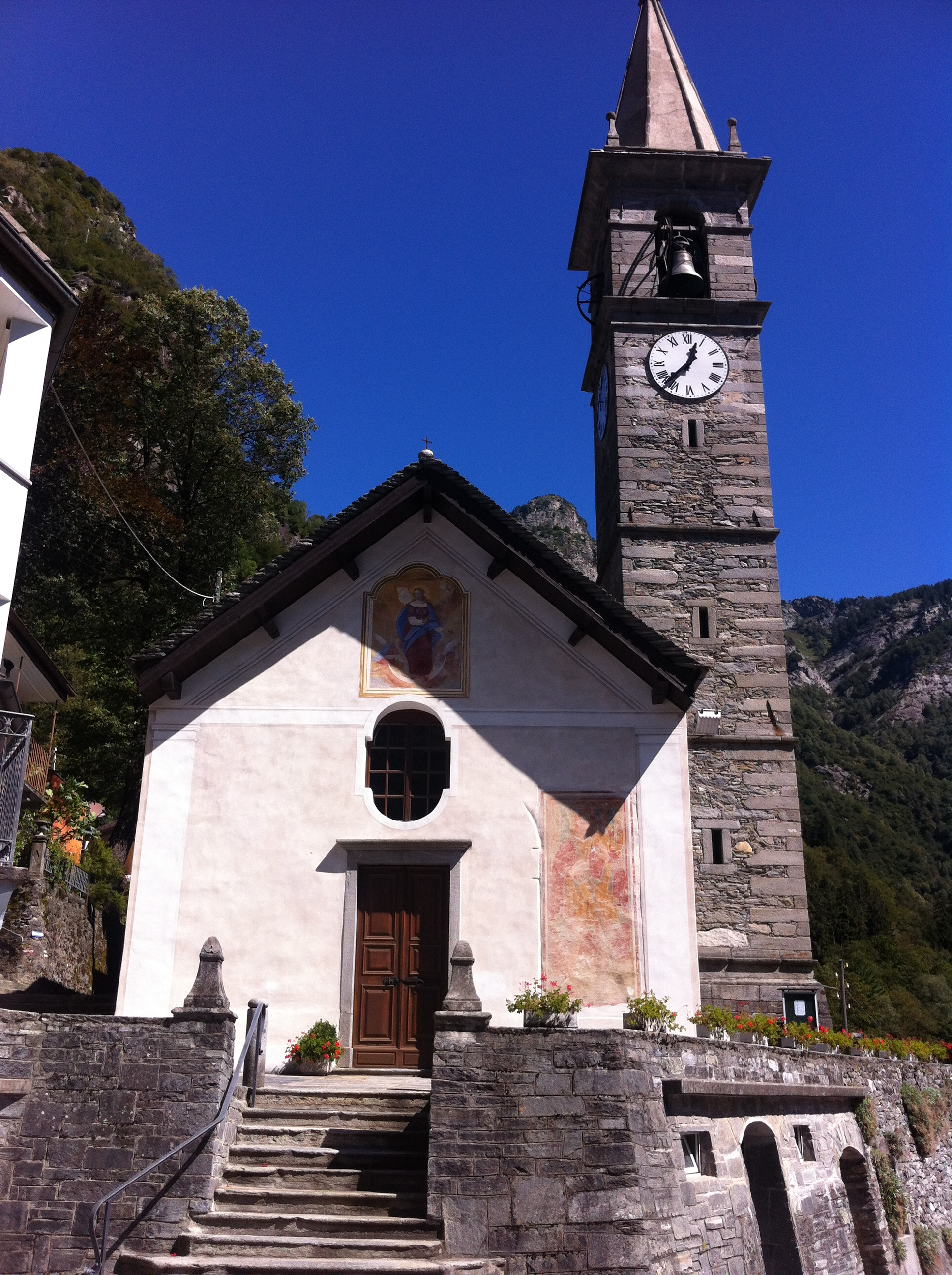
Russo village church

From the 2000 census, 232 or 72.0% were Roman Catholic, while 18 or 5.6% belonged to the Swiss Reformed Church. There are 58 individuals (or about 18.01% of the population) who belong to another church (not listed on the census), and 14 individuals (or about 4.35% of the population) did not answer the question.

== Education ==
In Onsernone about 68.7% of the population (between age 25–64) have completed either non-mandatory upper secondary education or additional higher education (either university or a Fachhochschule).

In Onsernone there were a total of 36 students (as of 2009). The Ticino education system provides up to three years of non-mandatory kindergarten and in Onsernone there were 5 children in kindergarten. The primary school program lasts for five years and includes both a standard school and a special school. In the village, 10 students attended the standard primary schools and 2 students attended the special school. In the lower secondary school system, students either attend a two-year middle school followed by a two-year pre-apprenticeship or they attend a four-year program to prepare for higher education. There were 9 students in the two-year middle school, while 1 students were in the four-year advanced program.

The upper secondary school includes several options, but at the end of the upper secondary program, a student will be prepared to enter a trade or to continue on to a university or college. In Ticino, vocational students may either attend school while working on their internship or apprenticeship (which takes three or four years) or may attend school followed by an internship or apprenticeship (which takes one year as a full-time student or one and a half to two years as a part-time student). There were 2 vocational students who were attending school full-time and 6 who attend part-time.

The professional program lasts three years and prepares a student for a job in engineering, nursing, computer science, business, tourism and similar fields. There was 1 student in the professional program.

As of 2000, there were 15 students from Onsernone who attended schools outside the municipality.

== Crime ==
In 2014 the crime rate, of the over 200 crimes listed in the Swiss Criminal Code (running from murder, robbery and assault to accepting bribes and election fraud), in Onsernone was 51 per thousand residents, slightly lower than the national average (64.6 per thousand). During the same period, the rate of drug crimes and violations of immigration, visa and work permit was 0 per thousand residents.

== Weather ==
The Mosogno weather station has an average of 104.8 days of rain or snow per year and on average receives 2,032 mm (80.0 in) of precipitation. The wettest month is September during which time Mosogno receives an average of 244 mm (9.6 in) of rain or snow. During this month there is precipitation for an average of 7.7 days. The month with the most days of precipitation is May, with an average of 13.6, but with only 236 mm (9.3 in) of rain or snow. The driest month of the year is December with an average of 72 mm (2.8 in) of precipitation over 5.6 days.

== Coat of Arms ==
Onsernone Coat of Arms

The 1995-2019 coat of arms symbolized the coming together of three municipalities to form a new one. It depicts a bridge in the background with 3 arches (symbolizing Comologno, Crana, and Russo) and a white bridge in front (Onsernone) spanning them.

After the fusion of five additional municipalities into Onsernone, a new coat of arms was adopted in 2019. It depicts the rye straw weaving which was the mainstay of the region's economy in the 19th Century, and also alludes to the weaving together of smaller municipalities into the larger municipality of Onsernone. At bottom, the coat of arms shows two waves of water symbolizing the River Isorno which carved the Onsernone Valley.
