= Comologno =

Village in Ticino, Switzerland

Coordinates: 46°12′N 8°35′E

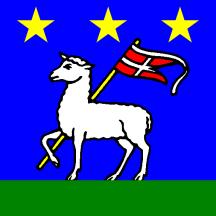
Flag

Comologno is a village and former municipality in the district of Locarno in the canton of Ticino, Switzerland.

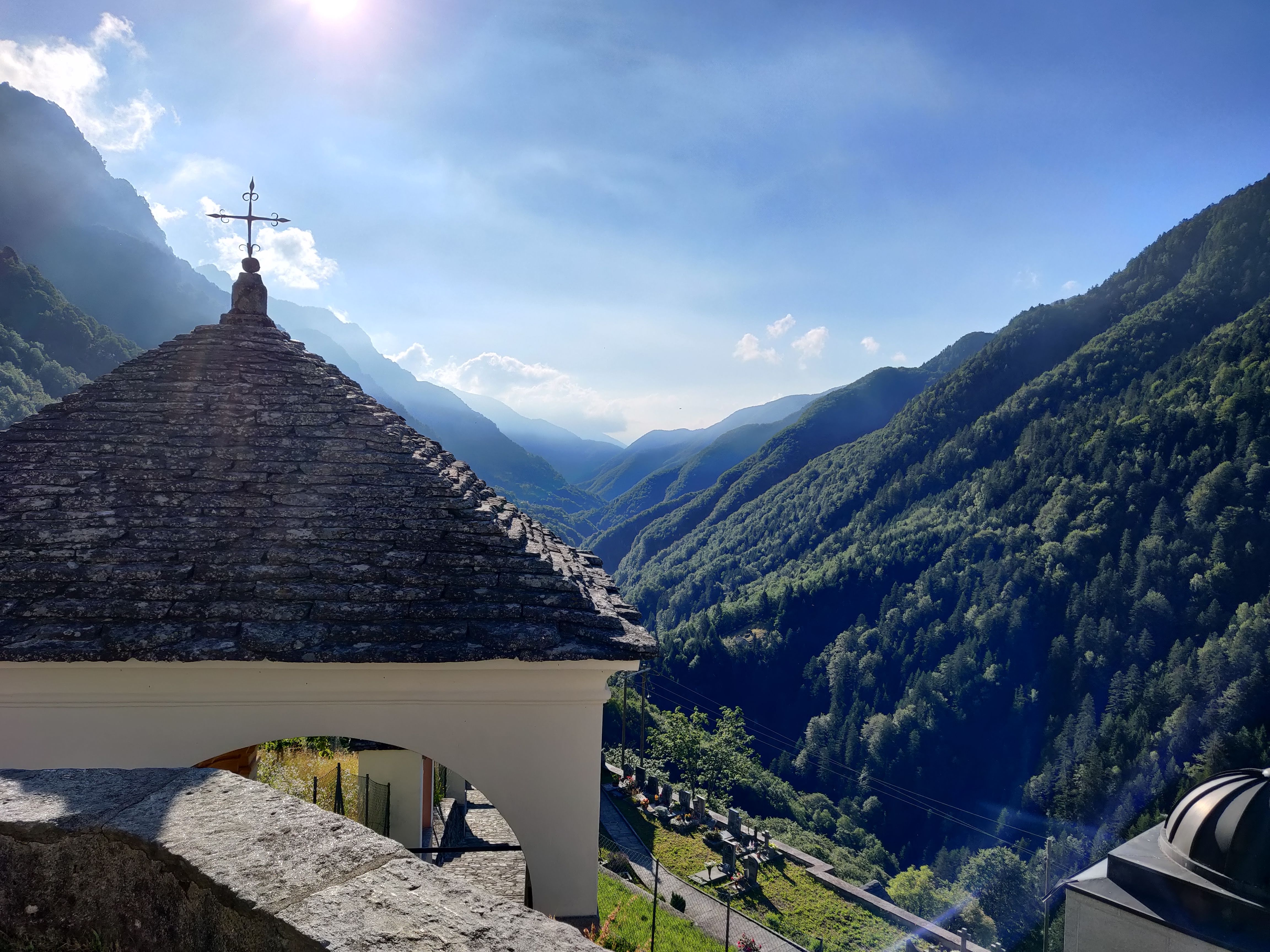
View from San Giovanni Batista Church, Comologno, Val Onsernone

In 1995 the municipality was merged with the other, neighboring municipalities Crana and Russo to form a new and larger municipality Onsernone.

The municipality also contained the villages Vocaglia, Corbella, Cappellino and Spruga.

== History ==
Comologno is first mentioned in 1438 as Comolognium.

During the Ancien Régime, Comologno belonged to the Squadra of Crana, which together with the other villages of the valley (with the exception of Auressio) formed the medieval municipality of Onsernone. With the establishment of the Canton of Ticino in 1803, Comologno became an independent municipality.

Comologno formed an independent parish in 1715, when it separated from Russo. The parish church of San Giovanni Battista, was built in 1668–1697.

With the emergence and development of rye straw processing in the 19th century, the population of Comologno increased rapidly. However, in the following century, the decline of farming, animal husbandry and straw craft led to a rapid population decline. Most of the working population works in industrial or service enterprises in the valley or commute to work in the agglomeration of Locarno. Many residents emigrated to other countries in search of work. Several families became wealthy in foreign countries, and used that wealth to build stately mansions in Comologno. The largest is from the Remonda family, who in the second half of the 18th century, became wealthy in France. Another notable mansion is the Palazzo (or Castello) della Barca which was acquired in the 1930s by Vladimir Rosenbaum for his wife Aline Valangin, a writer and artist. It soon became a haven for artists and well-known anti-fascists, including Ignazio Silone, Ernesto Rossi, Kurt Tucholsky, Hans Marchwitza, Ernesto Bonaiuti, Max Terpis, Elias Canetti, Wladimir Vogel and Jean-Paul Samson. Since the early 1970s, at the suggestion of the Associazione Amici di Comologno, various artists have decorated houses in the village with frescos.

== Historic population ==
The historical population is given in the following table:

Year	Population Comologno
1719	182
1795	253
1808	333
1850	440
1900	624
1950	477
1960	281
1990	142
