= Isorno (river) =

River in Italy and Switzerland

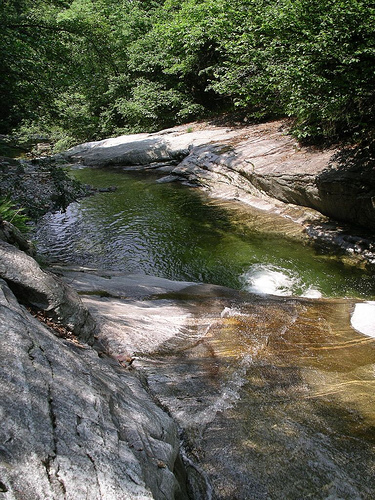

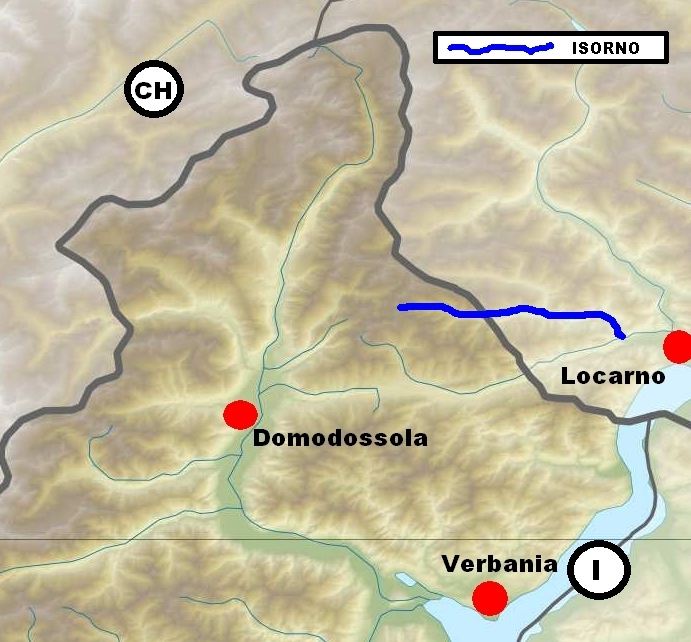

Location
- Country: Italy, Switzerland

Physical characteristics
- Source
  - location: Pioda di Crana
  - elevation: 2,283 m (7,490 ft)
- Mouth: Melezzo Orientale
  - coordinates: 46.1801°N 8.7063°E

Basin features
- Progression: Melezzo Orientale→ Maggia→ Lake Maggiore→ Ticino→ Po→ Adriatic Sea

The Isorno is an Italian and Swiss river, a tributary of the Melezzo Orientale.

Its source is in Italy near Pioda di Crana where it is called the Onsernone River. It passes through Bagni, a frazione of Craveggia. The official name changes to Isorno upon entering Switzerland, where it flows through Onsernone, Mosogno, Isorno, and finally Intragna where it joins the Melezzo Orientale River. Soon thereafter it flows into Lake Maggiore.

The Onsernone Valley, formed over the eons by the Isorno, although easily reached from Lugano, Bellinzona, Domodossola and Locarno, is one of the wildest and least-developed in Switzerland. There have been proposals to institute a national park in the Onsernone Valley like that of Engadin, but they have been voted down, most recently in 2018. Opponents fear such a park could bring in a slough of government regulations as well as mass tourism that would end the laid back lifestyle for which the area is known.
