= Russo, Switzerland =

Coordinates: 46°12′6″N 8°37′17″E

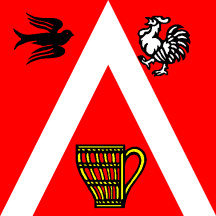
Flag

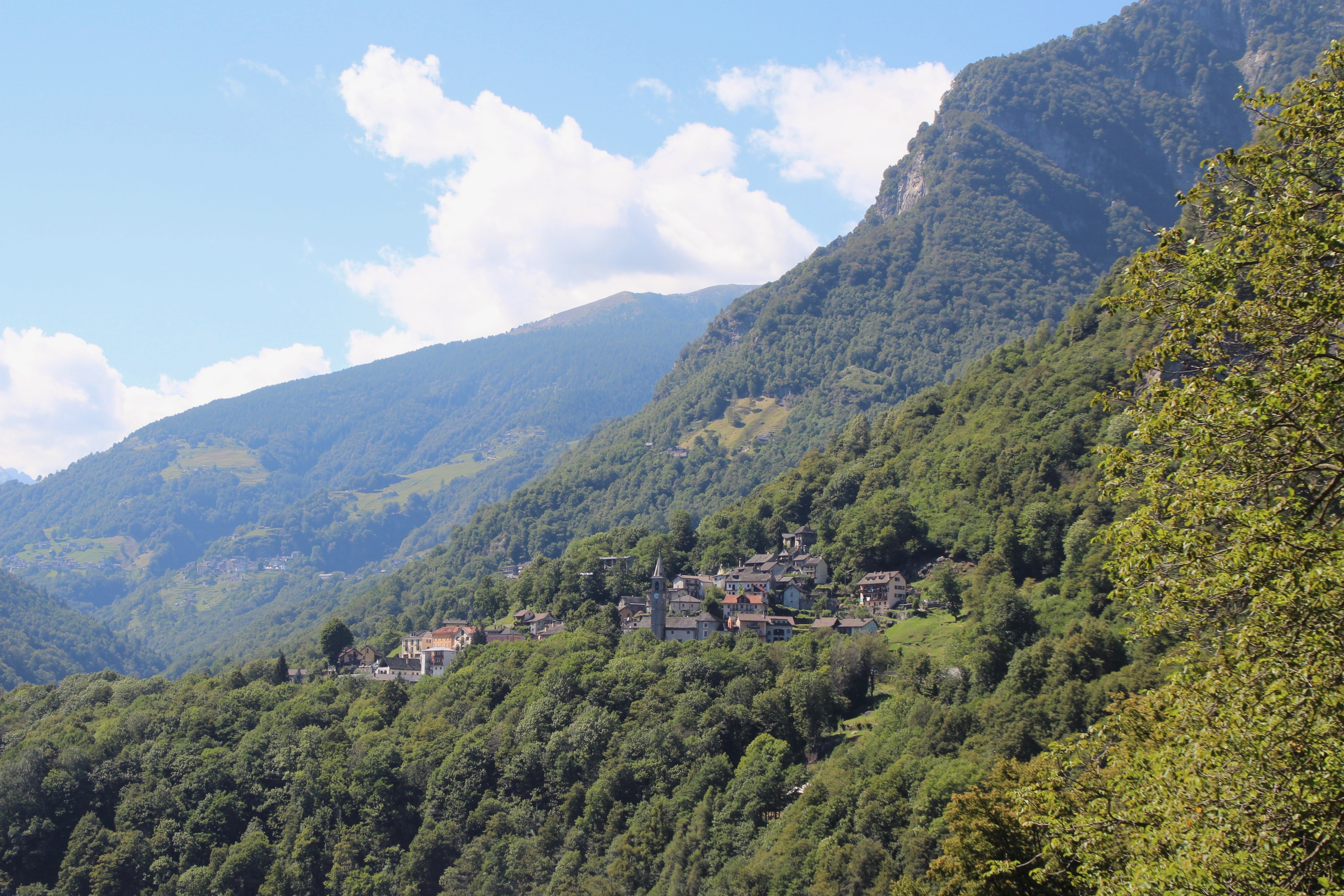

Russo is a village and former municipality in the district of Locarno in the canton of Ticino, Switzerland.

In 1995 the municipality was merged with the other, neighboring municipalities Comologno and Crana to form a new and larger municipality Onsernone.

Notable people: Evaristo Garbani-Nerini born Russo 1867, deceased Lugano 1944. Member and president of Swiss National Council and member Swiss Supreme Court. President Universal Postal Union.

== Historic population ==
The historical population is given in the following table:

Year	Population
1795	206
1808	239
1850	302
1900	248
1950	121
1970	84
1990	136
