= Crana =

Coordinates: 46°13′N 8°37′E

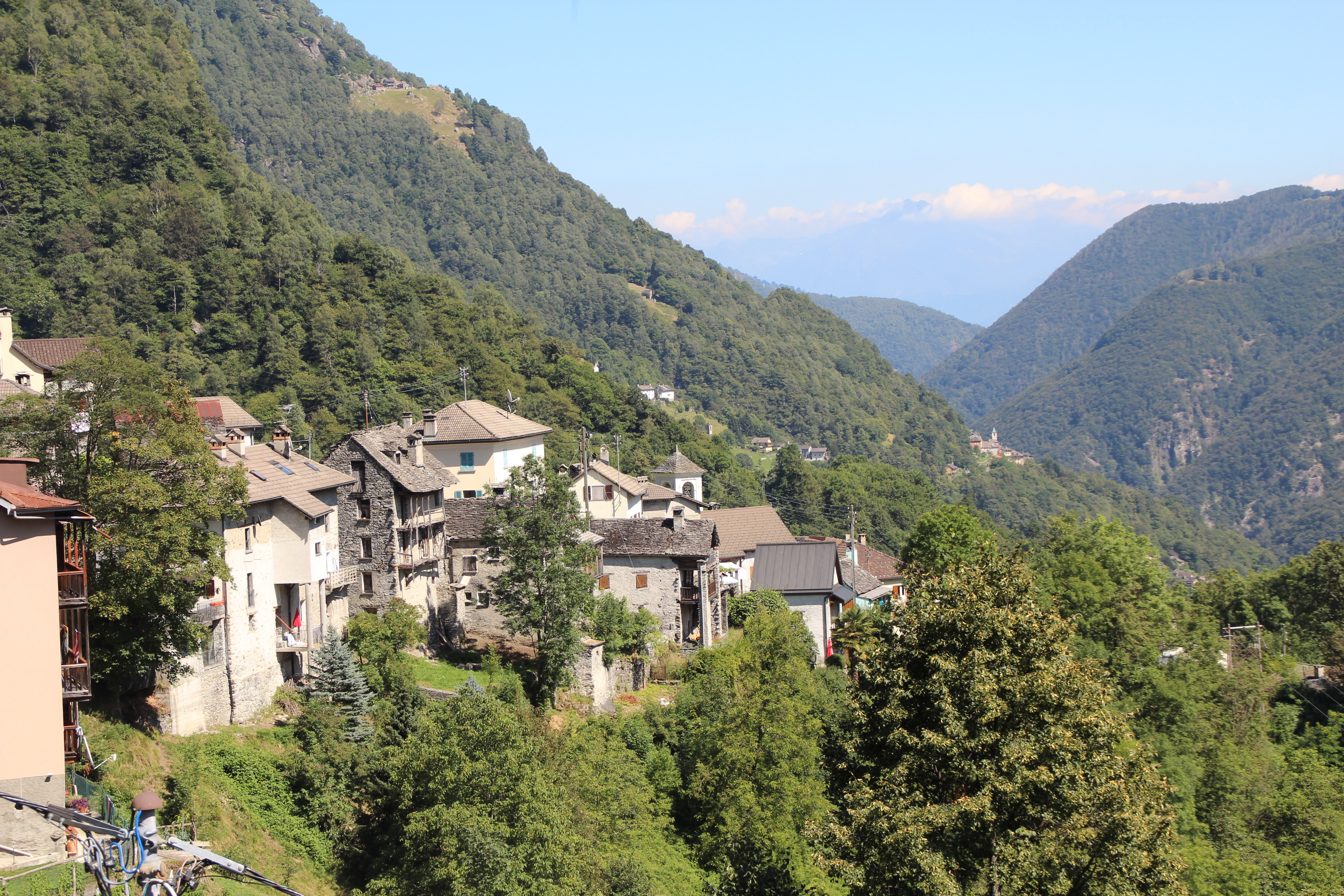

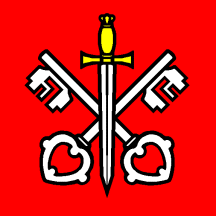
Flag

Crana is a village and former municipality in the district of Locarno in the canton of Ticino, Switzerland.

In 1995 the municipality was merged with the other, neighboring municipalities Comologno and Russo to form a new and larger municipality Onsernone.

== Historic population ==
The historical population is given in the following table:

Year	Population Crana
1795	134
1808	138
1850	185
1900	303
1950	134
1960	87
1990	49
