= Straw plaiting =

Method of manufacturing textiles

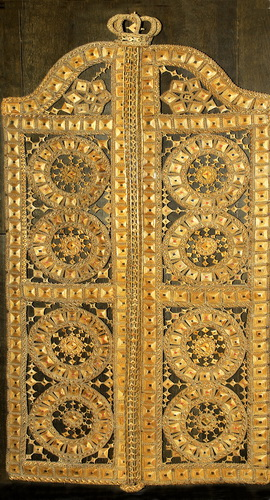
Royal doors at the old church in Liemiaševičy (Belarus)

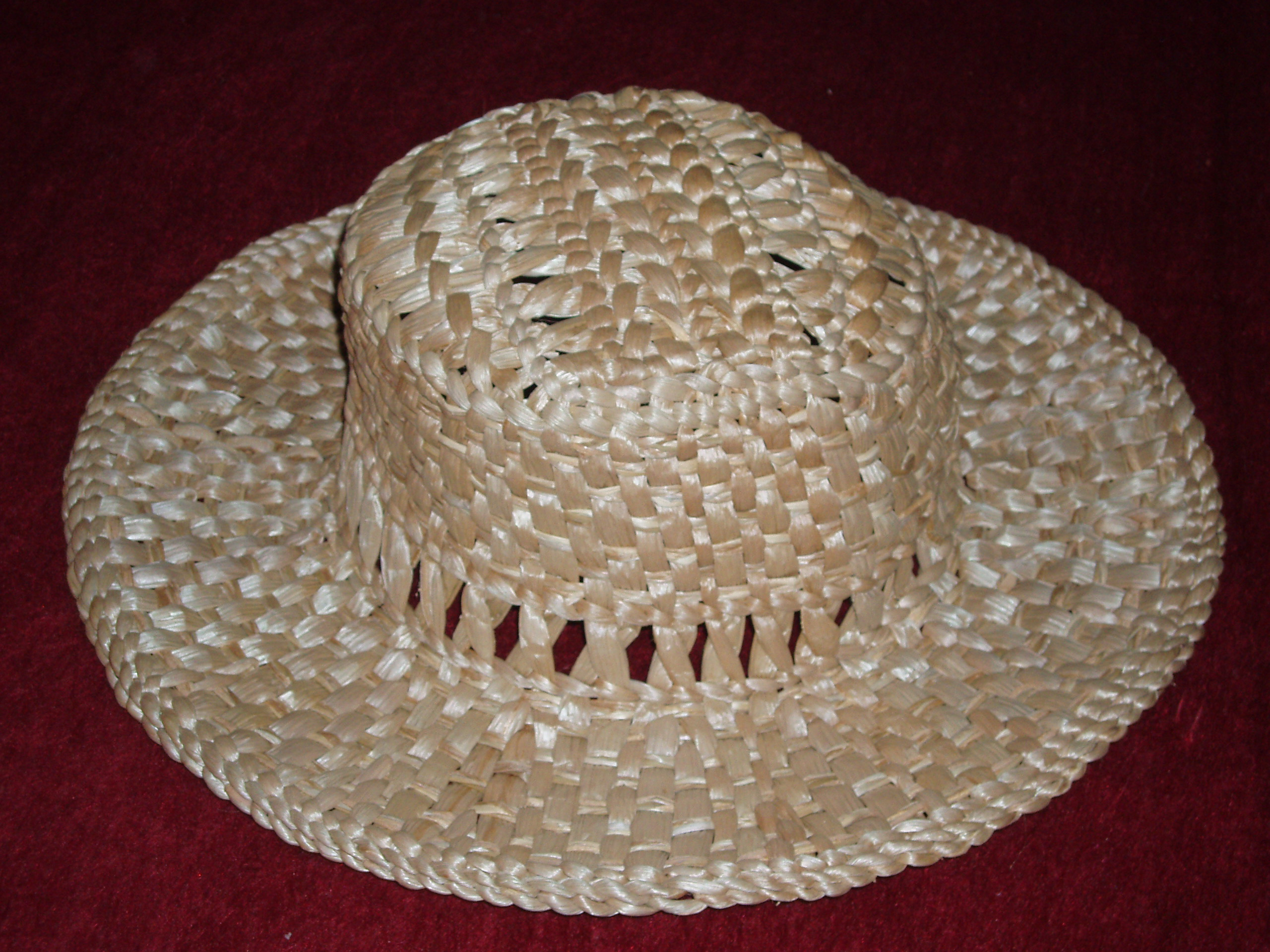
A traditional Ukrainian straw hat

Straw plaiting is a method of manufacturing textiles by braiding straw and the industry that surrounds the craft of producing these straw manufactures. Straw is plaited to produce products including straw hats and ornaments, and the process is undertaken in a number of locations worldwide.

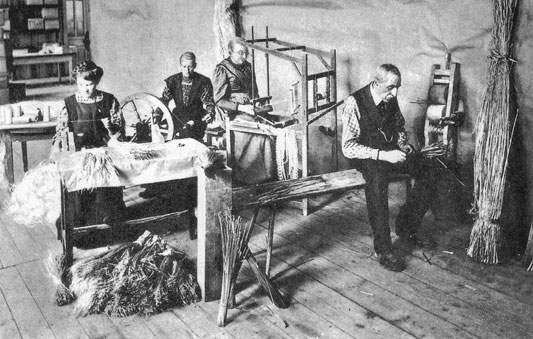
Straw weaving industry in Wohlen (Aargau, Switzerland) around 1900. Rye straw from the fields is being prepared by hand for machine processing.

== Etymology ==
To plait comes from late 14 century, "to fold, gather in pleats", also "to braid or weave", from Old French pleir "to fold", variant of ploier, ployer "to fold, bend", from Latin plicare "to fold".

== Applications ==
Straw can be plaited for a number of purposes, including: the thatching of roofs, to create a paper-making material, for ornamenting small surfaces as a "straw-mosaic", for plaiting into door and table mats, mattresses and for weaving and plaiting into light baskets and to create artificial flowers. Straw is also plaited to produce bonnets and hats.

== Belarus ==
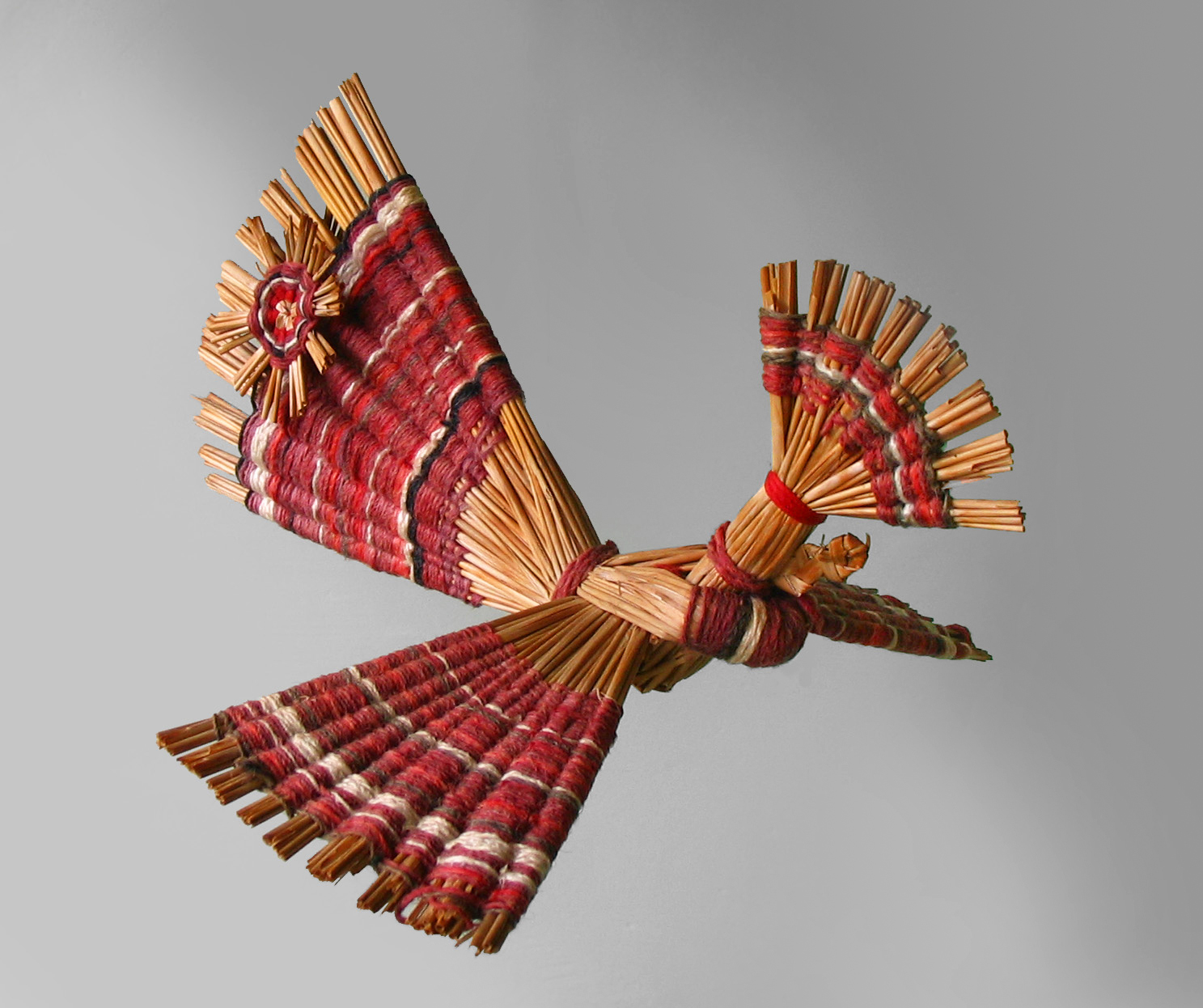
Belarusian straw toy

Straw weaving is an ancient folk craft of Belarus. In 2022 it was added to a UNESCO Representative List of the Intangible Cultural Heritage of Humanity.

== England ==
The plaiting of straw in the counties of Buckinghamshire, Bedfordshire, Berkshire and Hertfordshire formerly gave employment to many thousands of women and young children; but this had largely ended by the beginning of the 20th century: the number of English plaiters, all told, was not more than a few hundreds in 1907, as compared with 30,000 in 1871.

The districts around Luton in Bedfordshire and the neighbouring counties were, since the beginning of the 17th century, the British home of the straw-plait industry. The straw of certain varieties of wheat cultivated in that region is, in favourable seasons, possessed of a fine bright colour, tenacity and strength.

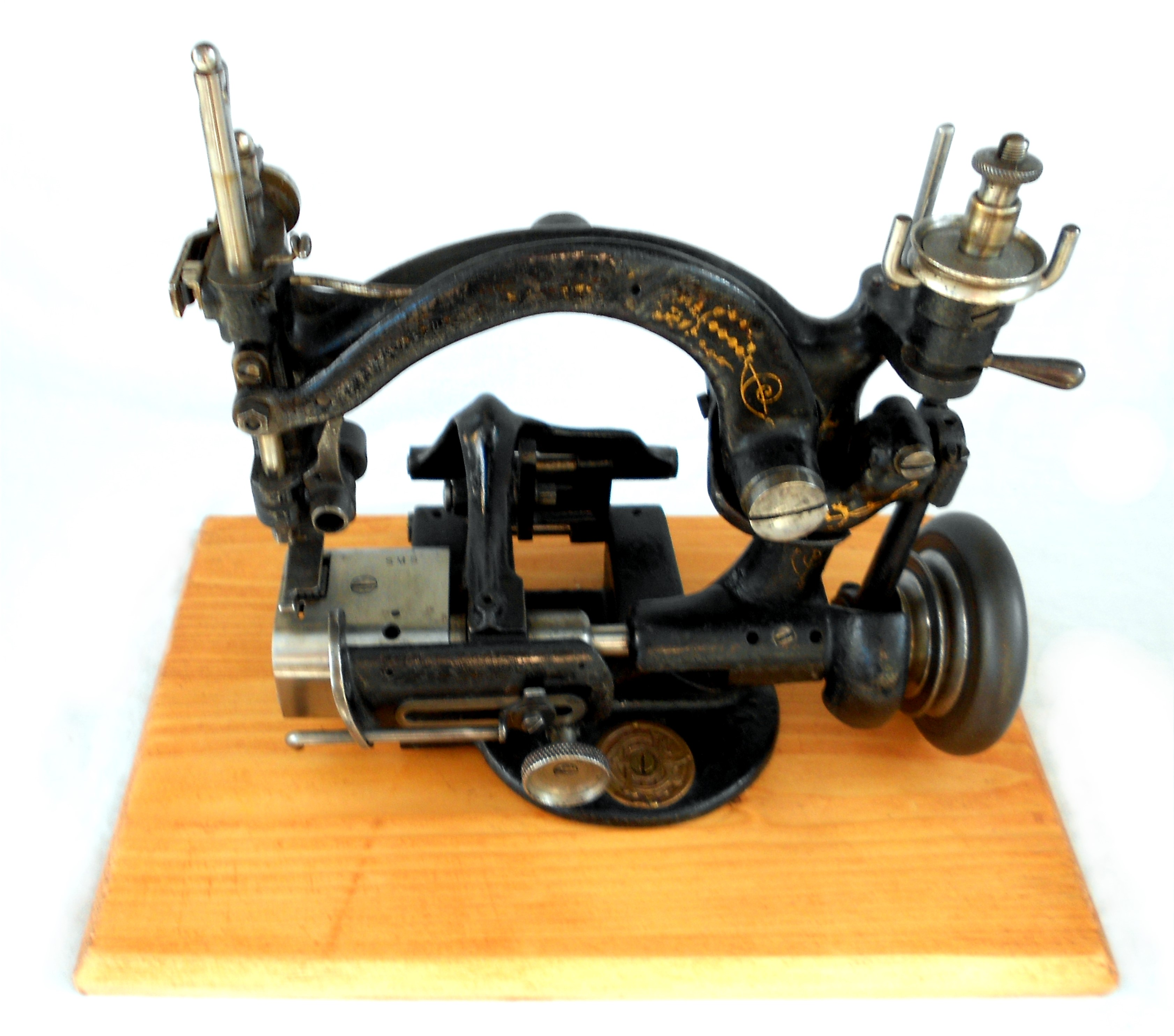
A Heinrich Grossmann machine. It is a twisted chain stitch sewing machine adapted from a Wilcox & Gibbs machine for making straw hats from plaited straw (C1880).

The straw is cut as in ordinary harvesting, but is allowed to dry in the sun, before binding. Subsequently, straws are selected from the sheaves, and of these the pipes of the two upper joints are taken for plaiting. The pipes are assorted into sizes by passing them through graduated openings in a grilled wire frame, and those of good color are bleached by the fumes of sulphur. Spotted and discoloured straws are dyed either in pipe or in plait. The plaiters work up the material in a damp state, either into whole straw or split straw plaits. Split straws are prepared with the aid of a small instrument having a projecting point which enters the straw pipe, and from which radiate the number of knife-edged cutters into which the straw is to be split. The straws were put through a small mangle to flatten them. They were then braided to produce a woven strip which was sold on to the makers of hats, baskets and other wares.

The plaiting was carried out by women and children who were taught the skills in plait schools. At its peak in the early nineteenth century a woman could earn more by plaiting than a man could earn on the land. There was concern that the industry led to dissolution and idleness in the menfolk.

The English industry was eventually wiped out by free trade from 1860 which allowed imports of plait from Italy and later China and Japan at a much lower competitive price.

== Tuscany ==
Worldwide, the most valuable straw for plaits is grown in Tuscany, and from it the well-known Tuscan plaits and Leghorn hats are made. The straw of Tuscany, specially grown for plaiting, is distinguished into three grades of quality. The highest quality is Pontedera Semone, the second highest is Mazzuolo. The bulk of the plaits are made from this grade of straw. The third grade, Santa Fioro, is only used to plait "Tuscan pedals" and braids. The wheat-seed for these straws is sown very thickly on comparatively elevated and arid land, and it sends up long attenuated stalks. When the grain in the ear is about half developed the straw is pulled up by the roots, dried in the sun, and subsequently spread out for several successive days to be bleached under the influence of alternate sunlight and night-dews. The pipe of the upper joint alone is selected for plaiting, the remainder of the straw being used for other purposes. These pipes are made up in small bundles, bleached in sulfur fumes in a closed chest; assorted into sizes, and so prepared for the plaiters. Straw-plaiting is a domestic industry among the women and young children of Tuscany and some parts of Emilia. Tuscan plaits and hats vary enormously in quality and value; the plait of a hat of good quality may represent the work of four or five days, while hats of the highest quality may each occupy six to nine months in making. The finest work is excessively trying to the eyes of the plaiters, who can at most give to it two or three hours' labor daily.

== China during the Tang dynasty (618–907) ==
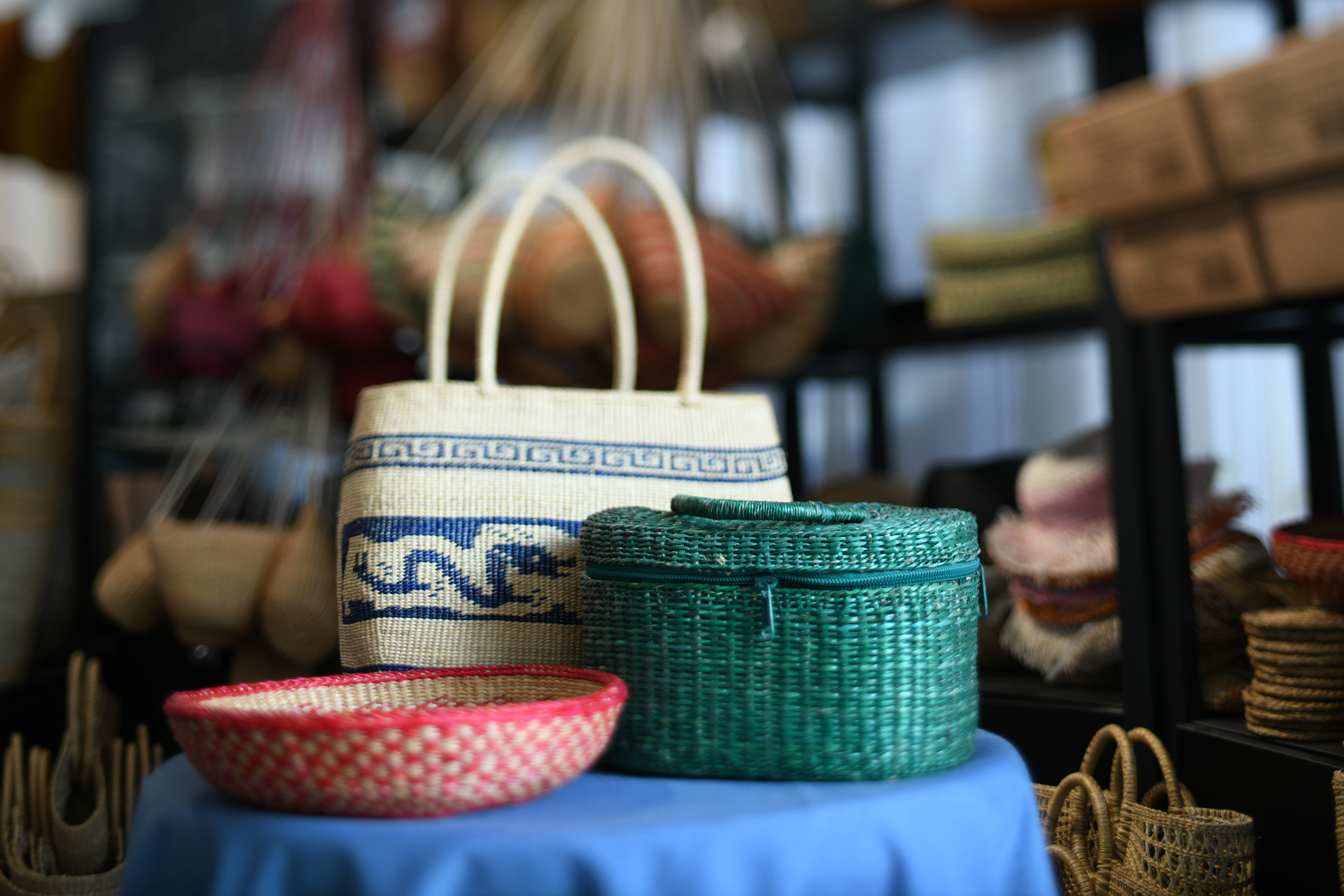
Xuhang straw plaiting products

Xuhang straw plaiting, produced in Xuhang, Jiading, has a long history. As early as the Tang dynasty more than 1,000 years ago, the plaiting of yellow grass has become one of the court tributes. In 1914, an Italian firm hired Wang Jihe and Zhu Shilin from Xuhang as agents to purchase yellow grass plaits from farmers in Xuhang, and resold them in Southeast Asia, Europe and the United States. Since then, Xuhang yellow grass plaits began to go abroad and enter the international market.

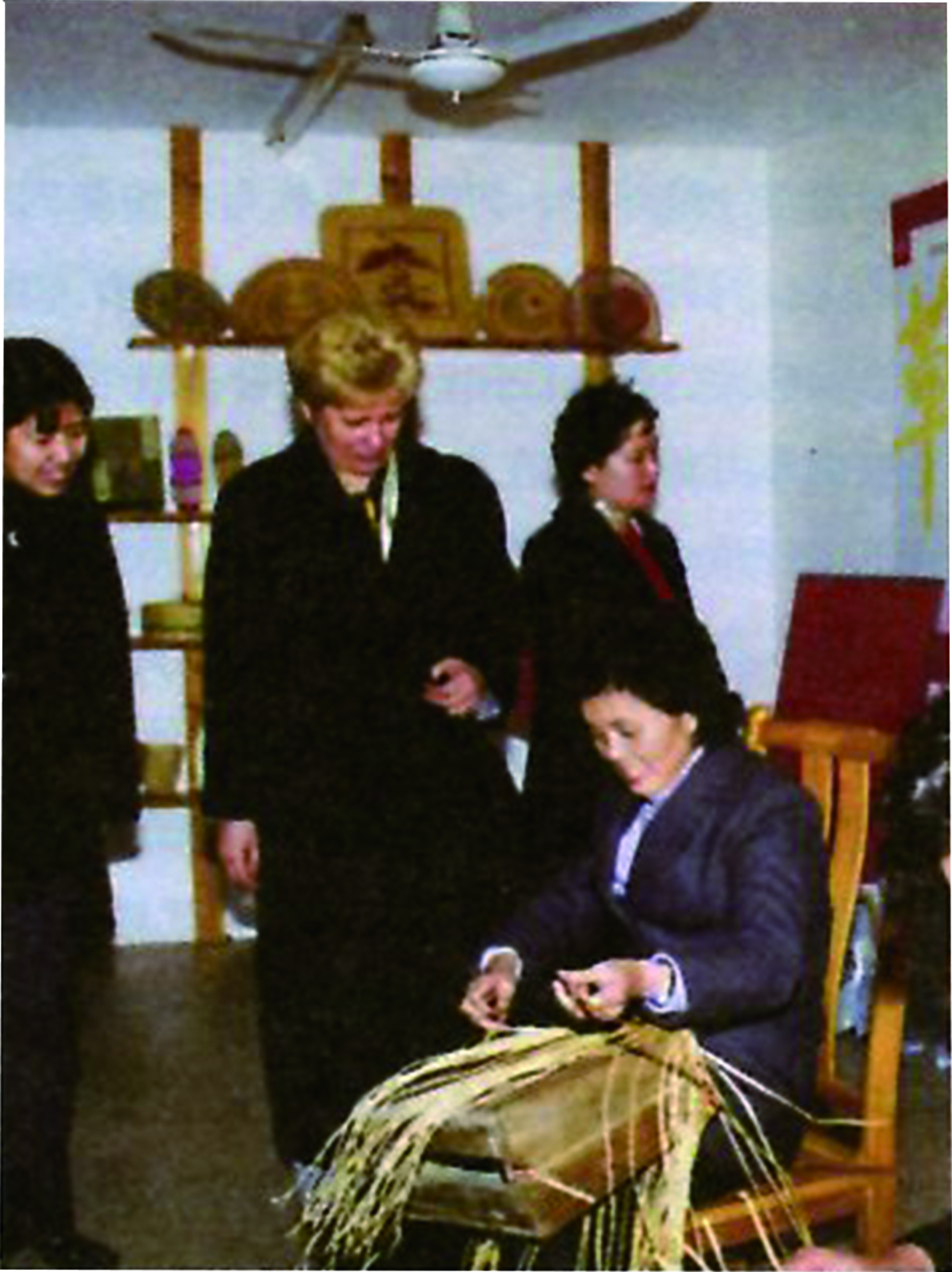
Foreign visitors at Xuhang, Jiading

With the gradual expansion of Xu Xing's influence and the continuous improvement of artistic connotation such as the dove of peace slippers designed and woven by Li Yueqin and the continuous efforts of preserving this unique type of folk art by the honorable straw plaiting artist Xu Xing, in 1994, the town of Xuhang was named the "Hometown of Chinese Folk Art" by the Ministry of Culture of the People's Republic of China. The art of Xuhang straw plaiting made it to the National Intangible Heritage List in 2008.

Today, visitors from all over the world travel to the town of Xuhang in Jiading of Shanghai to visit a local museum to relive the ancient history of how Xuhang straw was planted, harvested, processed and turned into functional art work featuring this unique form of world folk art. It has played significant role in common people's daily life, whether used in a pair of straw slippers, straw hat, straw basket, or a straw mat in ancient and modern China.

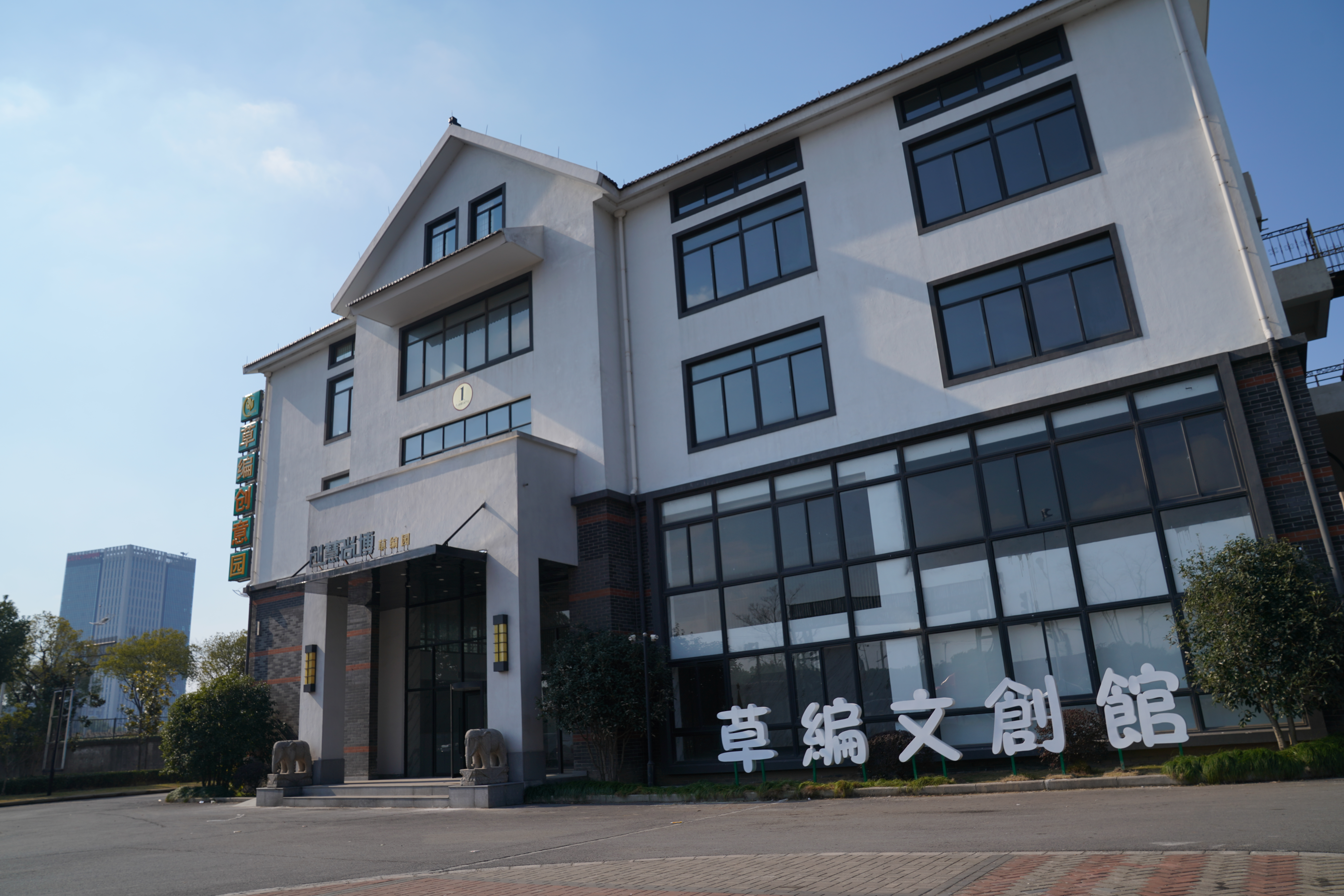
Modern day Xuhang Straw Plait Heritage Museum and Studio

== Oceania in 1896 ==
Friedrich Ratzel in The History of Mankind reported as follows:

The art of plaiting is diligently practised. For the coarser mats coco-nut fibre is employed; for the finer, pandanus leaves and rushes. An intelligent Fijian can always tell you from which island a mat came. The coarser kinds are used as floorcloths and hangings to the huts; the finer as sails, or sleeping-mats, or for children. Floor-mats are 5 to 8 yards in length, sail-mats 100 and more. Sleeping-mats are of two kinds – a thicker to lie on, and a thinner for covering; one of the most valued sorts has a pleat running through the middle of each strip of plaiting. Borders are worked on with designs in darker bands; white feathers and scraps of European stuffs are woven in. One of the prettiest productions of the art is the women's liku, a girdle woven from strips of the bast of the wau-tree (a kind of hibiscus), with the fibres of a root that grows wild, and blades of grass. Soft mats are made by plaiting the stalks of a fibrous plant into one, and removing the woody portions by bending and beating. Bags and baskets are admirably woven; fans, too, are made either of palm leaves strengthened at the edge and vandyked, or woven from bast. But superior to all these are the string and the cables – the best from coco-fibre, the inferior kinds from the bast of the wau-tree. In the Fiji Islands these are tastefully made up into balls, ovals, spindles, etc. Comparison with New Caledonia shows how high East Melanesia stands in this art. One has only to look at a New Caledonia fan beside one from Fiji. But in New Guinea, again, very elegant woven articles of all kinds are produced.

== See also ==
- Corn dolly, figures constructed from plaited straw with an ancient religious significance.
- Straw painting
