= Loco, Switzerland =

Village in Ticino, Switzerland

Coordinates: 46°12′N 8°40′E

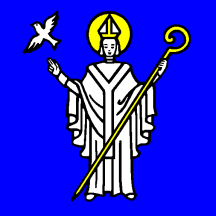
Flag

Loco is a village and former municipality in the canton of Ticino, Switzerland.

In 2001 the municipality of Loco was merged with the neighboring municipalities Auressio and Berzona to form a new and larger municipality Isorno. On 10 April 2016, Isorno, along with the municipalities of Vergeletto, Gresso, and Mosogno, were all joined to become part of the municipality of Onsernone.

== History ==
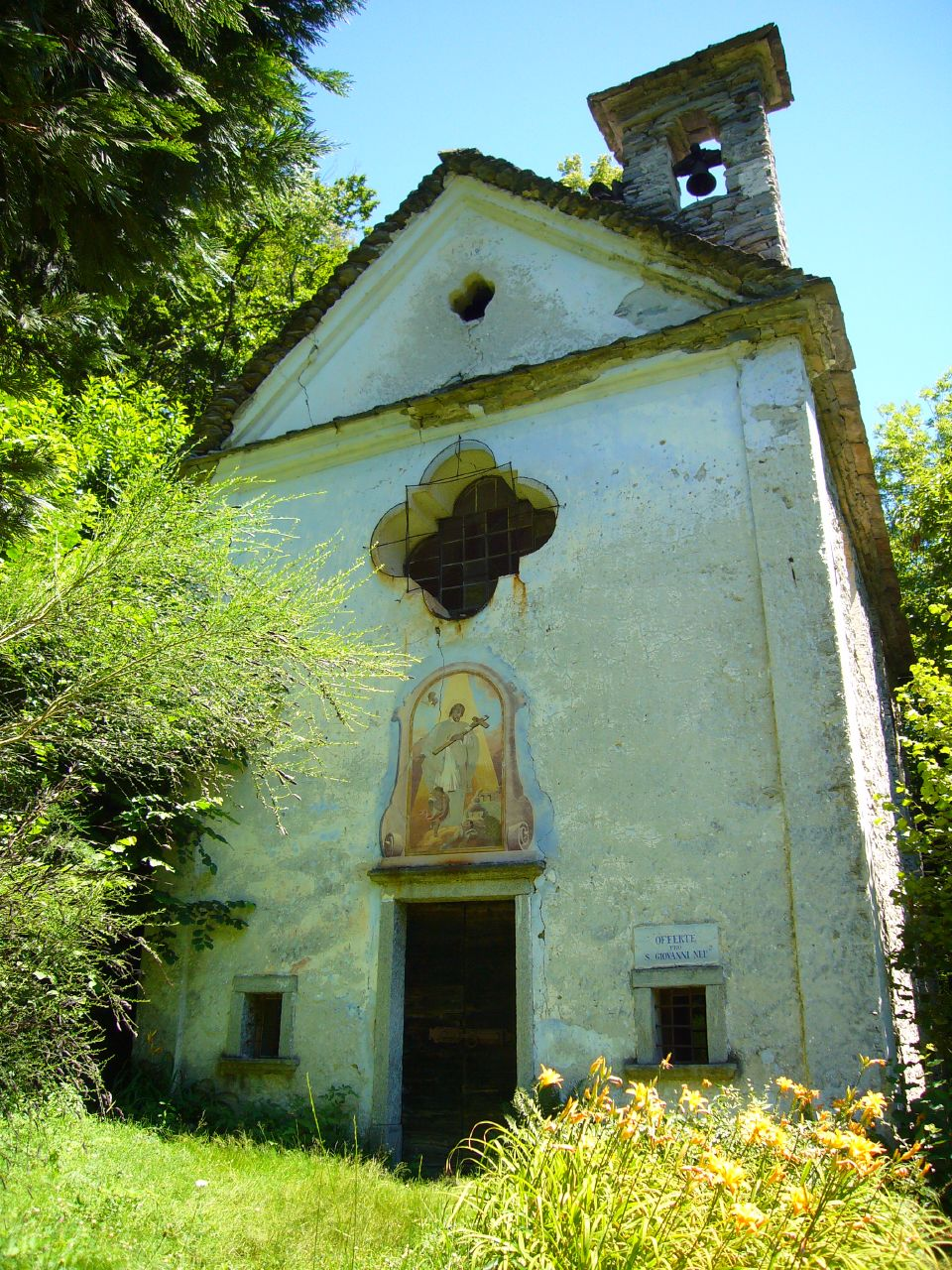
Chapel of St. John Nepomuk

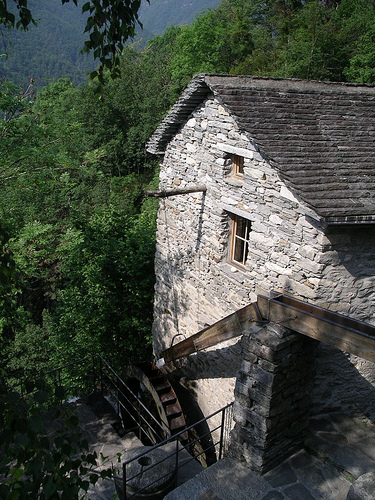
Mill of Loco

Aerial view (1963)

Loco is first mentioned in 1224 as Loco and was often referred to a Luogo as well.

The municipality also contained the hamlets of Niva and Rossa.

From the Middle Ages until the end of the Ancien Régime Loco was the capital of the old Onsernone valley community.

The parish church of San Remigio was the mother church of the valley and ancient seat of the Vicariate of Onsernone valley. It is first mentioned in 1228 (in the municipal archives), but is probably older. In the early 16th Century it was rebuilt and acquired its current steeple. It houses the Holy Cross chapel with an ancient, venerated cross relic. The church is also the home of a Last Supper painting by the Flemish painter Godefridus Maes from 1683. In the hamlet of Niva, there is a late baroque chapel of St. John Nepomuk. The chapel in Sassello is from the late 17th Century and is dedicated to the Madonna of Re.

In the 19th Century, Loco was a center of the straw braiding for hats, bags and other articles. The straw braids that were used for this purpose were produced in the other villages of the Onsernone valley.

In addition to the typical houses with balconies, a number of aristocratic mansions are located in the village. These include the Casa Broggini (built 1708) in Rossa.

The primary school for the area is located in Loco, along with the Onsernonese Museum (opened 1966) and the renovated retirement home of the Onsernone valley. Near Loco, in a restored mill, there is a permanent exhibition on the grain milling in the area. Casa Schira (built in the 19th century, now owned by the community) has a small public library and a hostel.

At the beginning of the 21st Century the majority of the workers commuted to Locarno.

== Historic population ==
The historical population is given in the following table:

Year	Population Loco
1795	684
1808	689
1850	600
1900	402
1950	258
2000	254
