= Aurigeno =

Village in Ticino, Switzerland

- Former municipality
- Aerial view (1954)

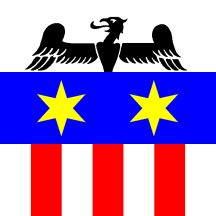
- Flag Coat of arms
- Location of Aurigeno
- Location within Switzerland Location within Canton of Ticino
- Coordinates: 46°13′54″N 8°42′44″E
- Country: Switzerland
- Canton: Ticino
- District: Vallemaggia

Area
  - Total: 10.94 km^{2} (4.22 sq mi)
- Elevation: 341 m (1,119 ft)

Population (2003)
  - Total: 384
  - Density: 35.1/km^{2} (90.9/sq mi)
- Time zone: UTC+01:00 (CET)
  - Summer (DST): UTC+02:00 (CEST)
- Postal code: 6677
- SFOS number: 5301
- ISO 3166 code: CH-TI
- Surrounded by: Aurigeno, Avegno, Cavigliano, Gordevio, Isorno, Maggia, Moghegno, Verscio
- Website: SFSO statistics

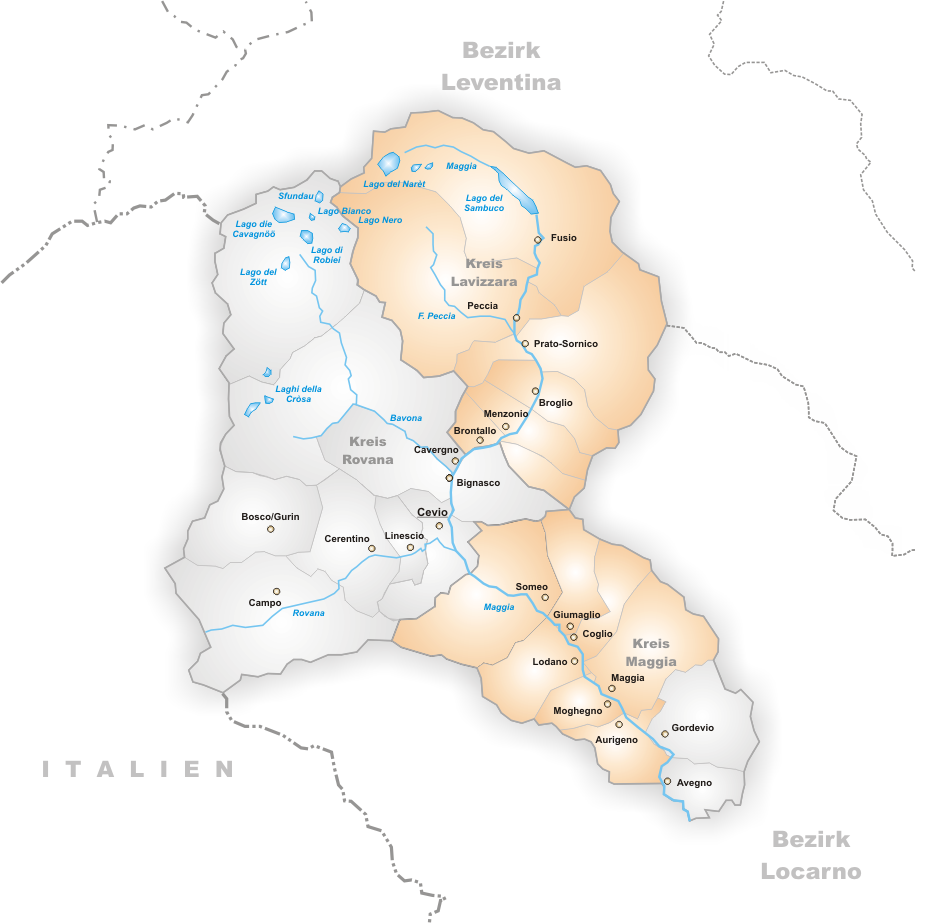
2003 map with Aurigeno.

Aurigeno is a village and former municipality in the district of Vallemaggia in the canton of Ticino, Switzerland. It was first recorded in 1276 as Urigeno.

The municipality had 398 inhabitants in 1709, which decreased to 302 in 1801, 297 in 1850, 219 in 1900, 214 in 1950 and 127 in 1970. It then rose again, to 316 in 1990 and 384 in 2003. The municipality had an area of 11.04 km^{2}.

In 2004 the municipality was incorporated into the larger, neighboring municipality Maggia.
