= Auressio =

Village in Switzerland

- Former municipality
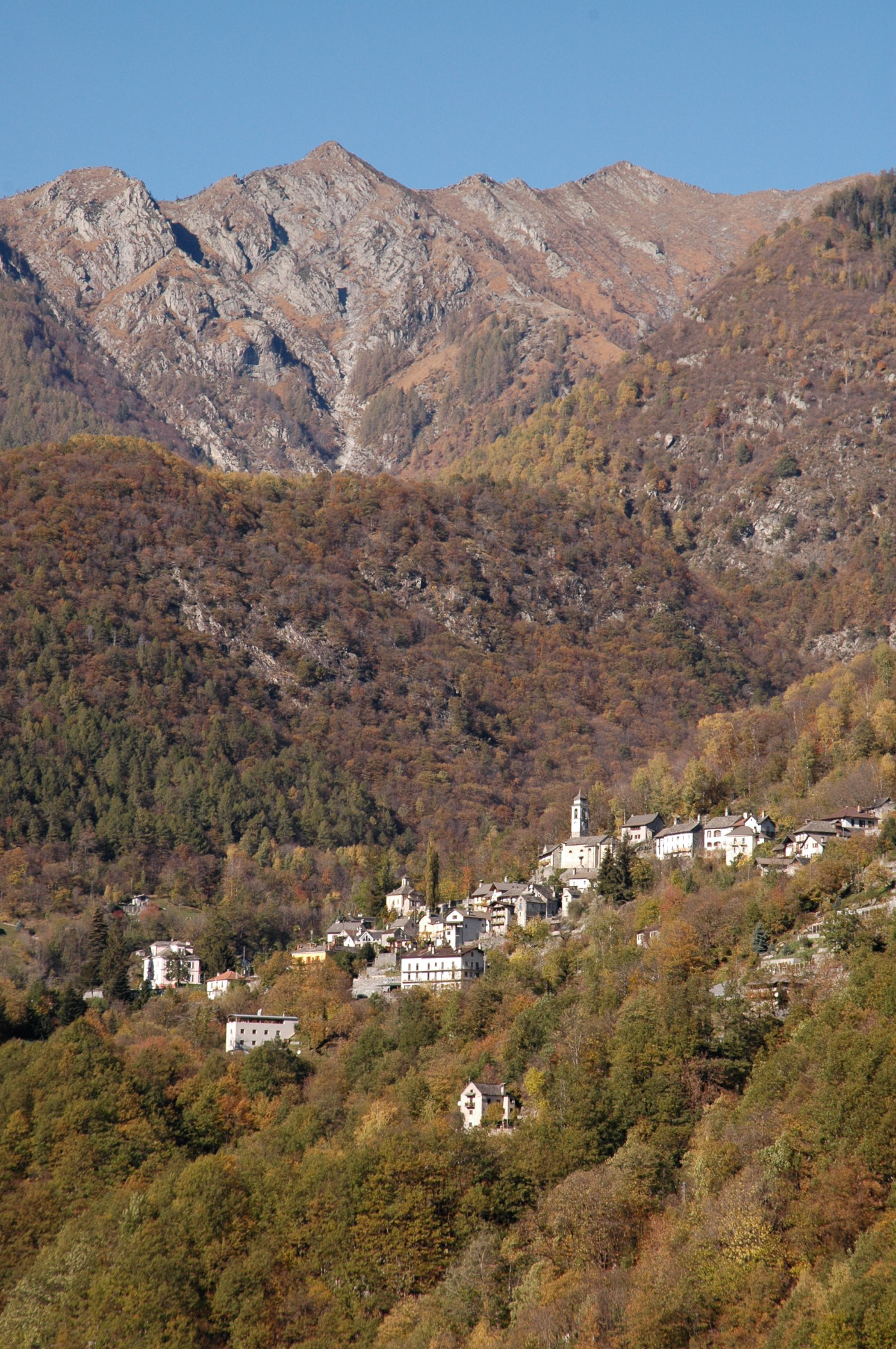

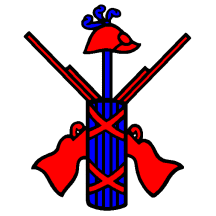
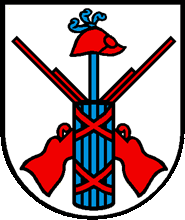
- Flag Coat of arms
- Location of Auressio
- Location within Switzerland Location within Canton of Ticino
- Coordinates: 46°12′04″N 8°41′03″E
- Country: Switzerland
- Canton: Ticino
- District: Locarno

Area
  - Total: 2.99 km^{2} (1.15 sq mi)
- Elevation: 631 m (2,070 ft)

Population (December 2000)
  - Total: 71
  - Density: 24/km^{2} (62/sq mi)
- Time zone: UTC+01:00 (CET)
  - Summer (DST): UTC+02:00 (CEST)
- Postal code: 6661
- SFOS number: 5092
- ISO 3166 code: CH-TI
- Surrounded by: Aurigeno, Cavigliano, Loco, Torricella-Taverne
- Website: SFSO statistics

Auressio is a village and former municipality in the canton of Ticino, Switzerland.

In 2001 the municipality was merged with the other, neighboring municipalities Berzona and Loco to form a new and larger municipality Isorno.

== Historic population ==
The historical population is given in the following table:

Year	Population Auressio.
1795	240
1808	273
1850	198
1900	164
1950	76
2000	71
