= Berzona =

- Former municipality
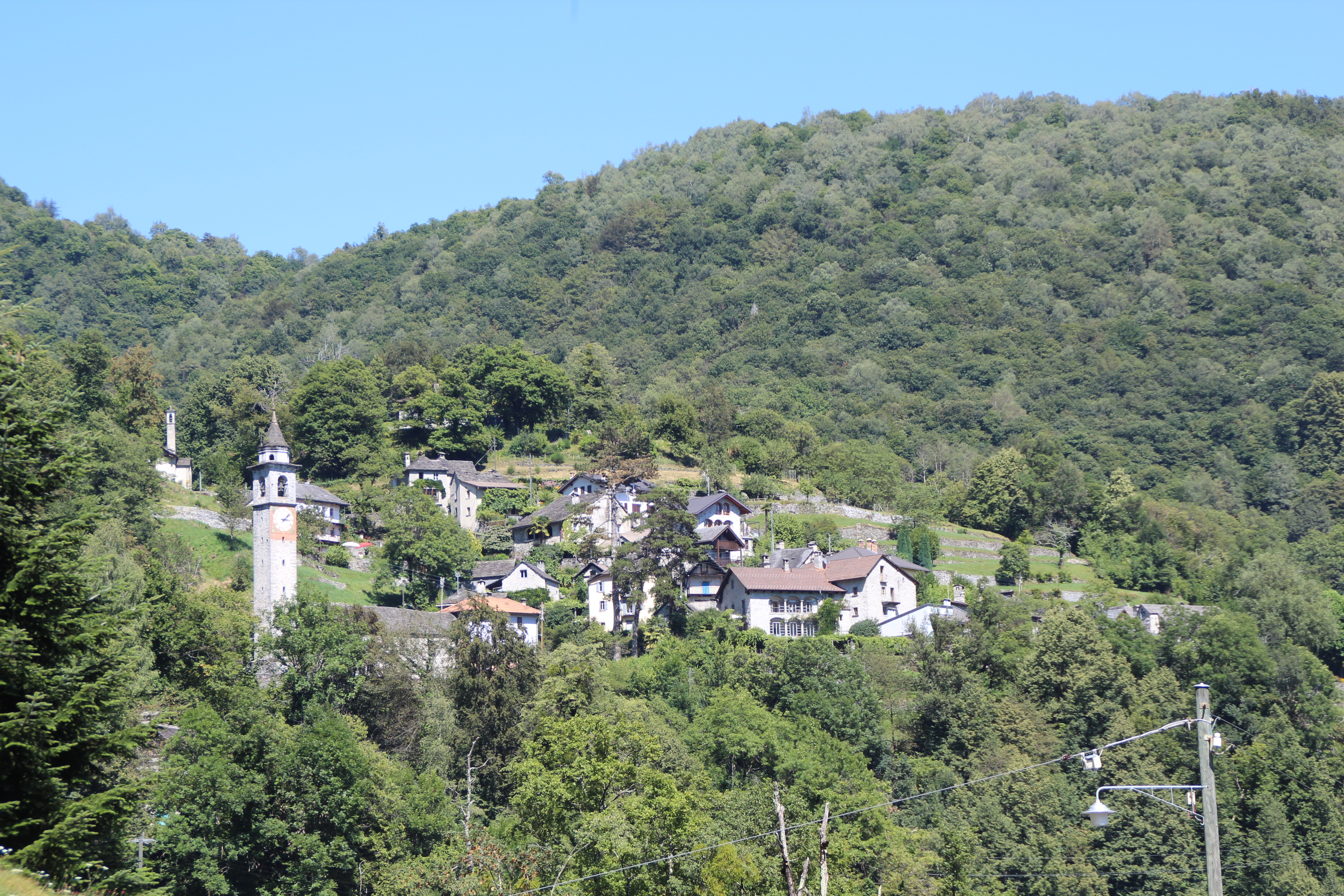

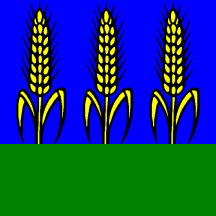
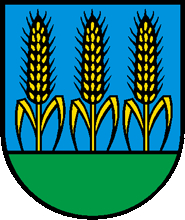
- Flag Coat of arms
- Location of Berzona
- Location within Switzerland Location within Canton of Ticino
- Coordinates: 46°13′N 8°51′E
- Country: Switzerland
- Canton: Ticino
- District: Locarno

Area
  - Total: 5.24 km^{2} (2.02 sq mi)
- Elevation: 764 m (2,507 ft)

Population (31 December 2000)
  - Total: 48
  - Density: 9.2/km^{2} (24/sq mi)
- Time zone: UTC+01:00 (CET)
  - Summer (DST): UTC+02:00 (CEST)
- Postal code: 6661
- SFOS number: 5093
- ISO 3166 code: CH-TI
- Surrounded by: Intragna, Loco, Mosogno
- Website: SFSO statistics

Berzona is a village and former municipality in the canton of Ticino, Switzerland.

In 2001 the municipality was merged with the other, neighboring municipalities Auressio and Loco to form a new and larger municipality Isorno.

== Historic population ==
The historical population is given in the following table:

Year	Population Berzona
1795	306
1808	286
1850	235
1900	151
1950	84
2000	48
