= Giumaglio =

Coordinates: 46°16′26″N 8°40′55″E

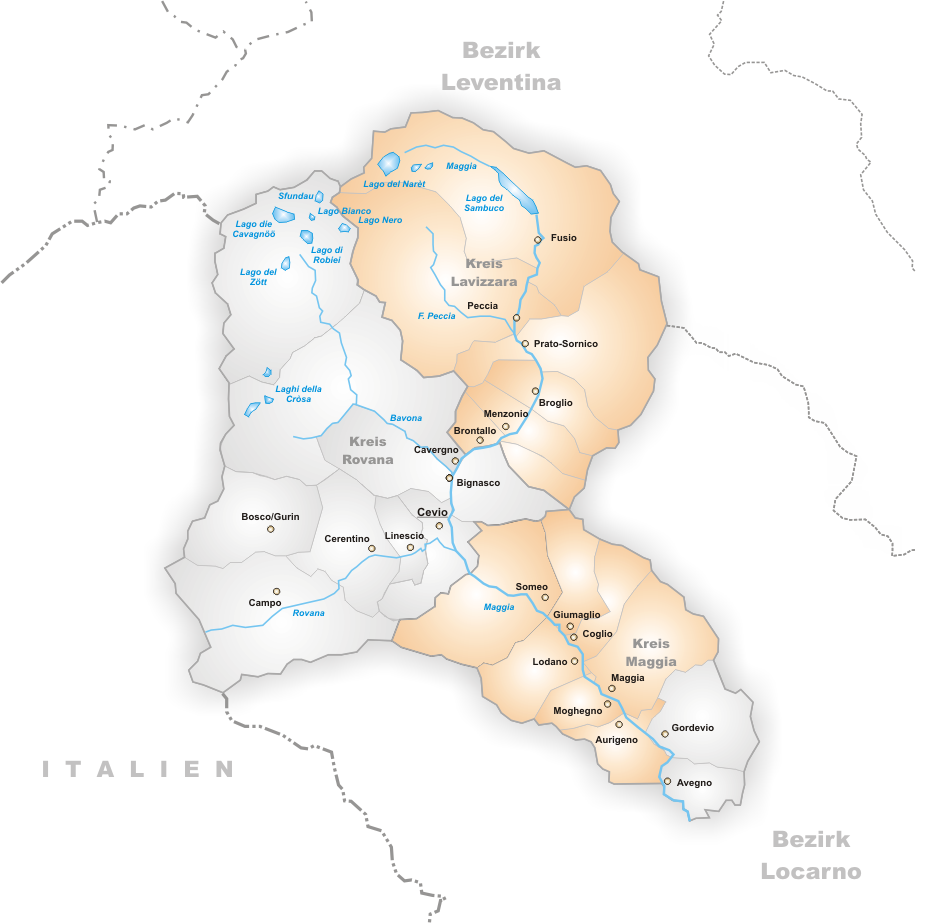
2003 map with Giumaglio.

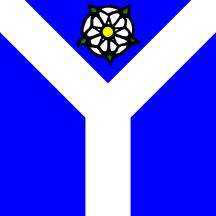
Flag of Giumaglio.

Coat of arms of Giumaglio.

Giumaglio is a village and former municipality in the district of Vallemaggia in the canton of Ticino, Switzerland.

Aerial view (1954)

It was first recorded in 1224 as Zumano.

The municipality had 300 inhabitants in 1591, which decreased to 125 in 1761. It then increased, to 188 in 1801 and 413 in 1850, before declining again to 232 in 1900, 204 in 1950 and 167 in 1970. It then rose somewhat, to 202 in 2000 and 210 in 2003. The municipality had an area of 13.17 km².

In 2004 the municipality was incorporated into the larger, neighboring municipality Maggia.
