= Lodano =

Village in Switzerland

Coordinates: 46°15′N 8°41′E

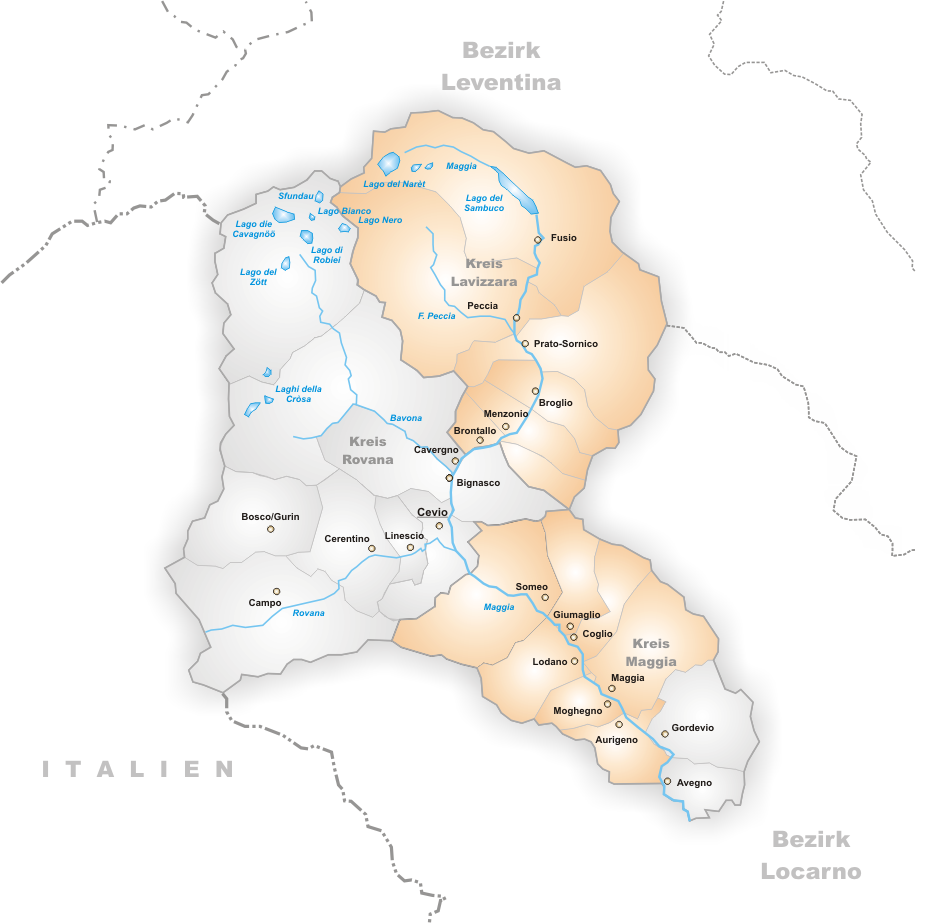
2003 map with Lodano.

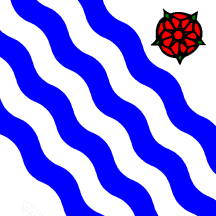
Flag of Lodano.

Coat of arms of Lodano.

Lodano is a village and former municipality in the district of Vallemaggia in the canton of Ticino, Switzerland.

Aerial view (1954)

It was first recorded in 1224 as Lodino.

The municipality had 70 inhabitants in 1709, which increased to 85 in 1801, 140 in 1850 and 141 in 1900. It then declined to 134 in 1950 and 86 in 1970, before rising again, to 171 in 2000 and 191 in 2003. The municipality had an area of 13.76 km².

In 2004 the municipality was incorporated into the larger, neighboring municipality Maggia.

Since 2021 the ancient beech forests of the Lodano Valley have been inscribed on the UNESCO World Heritage List in the context of the property "Ancient and Primeval Beech Forests of the Carpathians and Other Regions of Europe". https://www.valledilodano.ch/en
