= Maggia (municipality) =

- Municipality
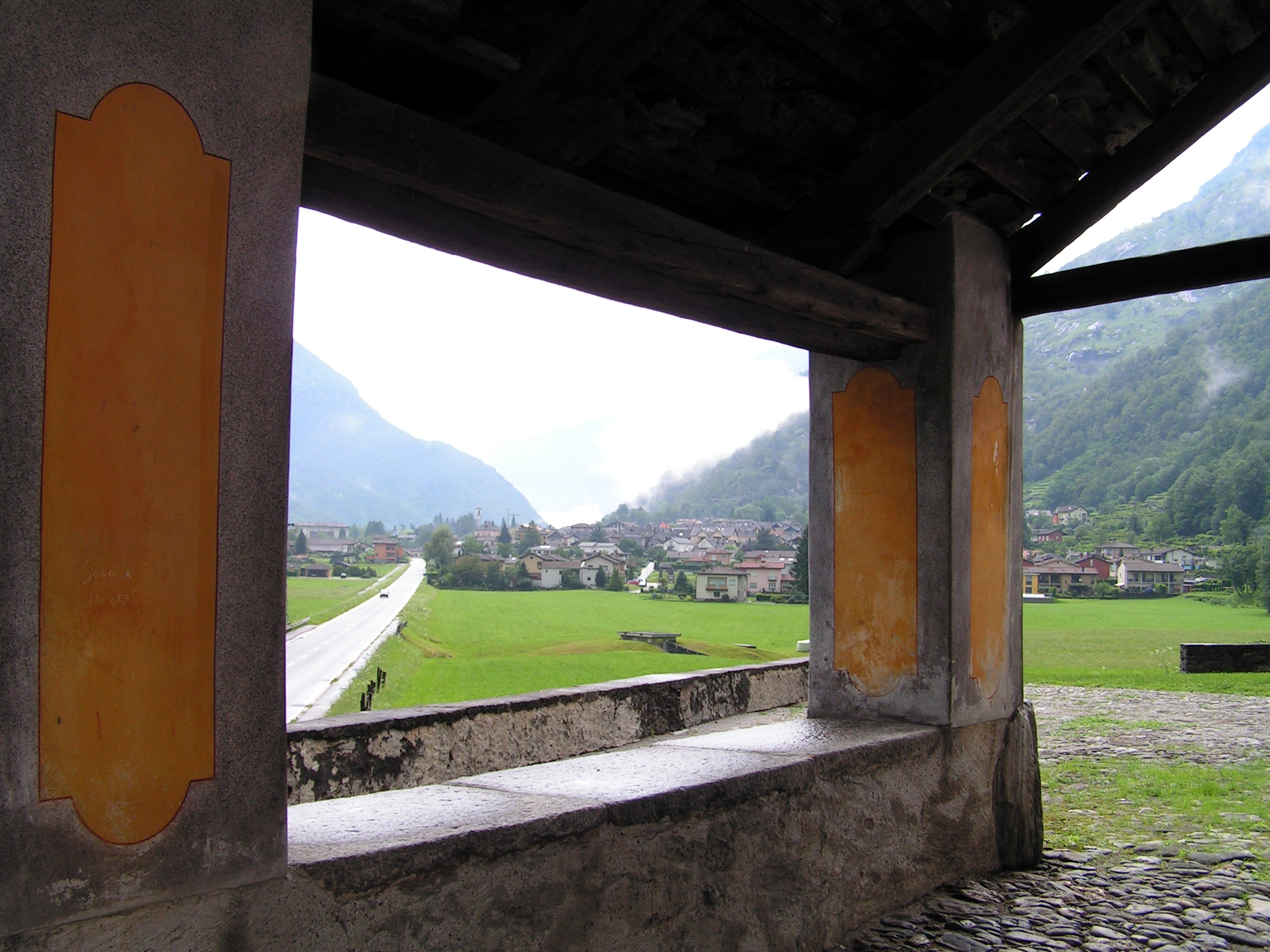
- Maggia village from S. Maria Delle Grazie

- Flag Coat of arms
- Location of Maggia
- Location within Switzerland Location within Canton of Ticino
- Coordinates: 46°14′N 8°42′E
- Country: Switzerland
- Canton: Ticino
- District: Vallemaggia

Government
  - Mayor: Sindaco

Area
  - Total: 111.09 km^{2} (42.89 sq mi)
- Elevation: 372 m (1,220 ft)

Population (December 2004)
  - Total: 2,358
  - Density: 21.23/km^{2} (54.98/sq mi)
- Time zone: UTC+01:00 (CET)
  - Summer (DST): UTC+02:00 (CEST)
- Postal code: 6671,6673,6674
- SFOS number: 5317
- ISO 3166 code: CH-TI
- Localities: Maggia, Moghegno, Aurigeno, Giumaglio, Someo, Lodano
- Surrounded by: Avegno, Brione (Verzasca), Campo (Vallemaggia), Cavigliano, Cevio, Gordevio, Gresso, Isorno, Lavizzara, Onsernone, Vergeletto, Verscio
- Website: www.maggia.ch

Maggia is a municipality in the district of Vallemaggia in the canton of Ticino in Switzerland.

Maggia's municipal borders were created in 2004 when the previous municipalities of Maggia, Moghegno, Aurigeno, Giumaglio, Someo, and Lodano were united. The municipality contains roughly 2,500 inhabitants and its official language is Italian.

== History ==
Maggia is first mentioned in 1200 as de madia. In 1225 it was mentioned as Madiis, 1270 Madia.

It was first recorded in 1270 as Madiis. This history contradicts a persistent legend about the history of the town's name. "Maggio", meaning "May" in Italian, was thought to be the source of Maggia's name as legend dictated that in this month settlers first arrived at the site.

Roman era graves have been discovered in Maggia.

Maggia broke away from the parish of S. Vittore in Murano in 1000, to form their own parish. The church in Maggia was the first parish church of the lower Maggia valley. It was the mother church of the other parishes that developed in the region in the following centuries. The current church of St. Mauritius was built in 1636. In 1855 the front facade was extended, followed in 1881 by a monumental staircase. The church was renovated in 1996-98. The Oratory of Madonna delle Grazie was built in 1510 on the site of an earlier chapel. It contains frescoes from around the construction and votive paintings by Giovanni Antonio Vanoni. In the Antrobio chapel there are frescoes from the 15th Century, which are among the oldest in the valley.

The local economy was, up in the middle of the 20th century, based on agriculture, even if a portion of the population worked in the quarries. Starting in the 18th century there was a major emigration to Italy, and later overseas. Between 1907 and 1965, Maggia was served by the railway line Locarno-Bignasco. The residential area initially clustered around the nucleus. The old village core included Casa Martinelli which was built in the 17th century, was used as a school house and then a retirement home. With the economic growth of Locarno the population of Maggia grew. The village expanded in the direction of the fields and grottos. In 1977-78, the Aurigeno school opened, which was a central school for the lower Vallemaggia. With the merger of 2004, Maggia has become a more important regional center.

== Geography ==
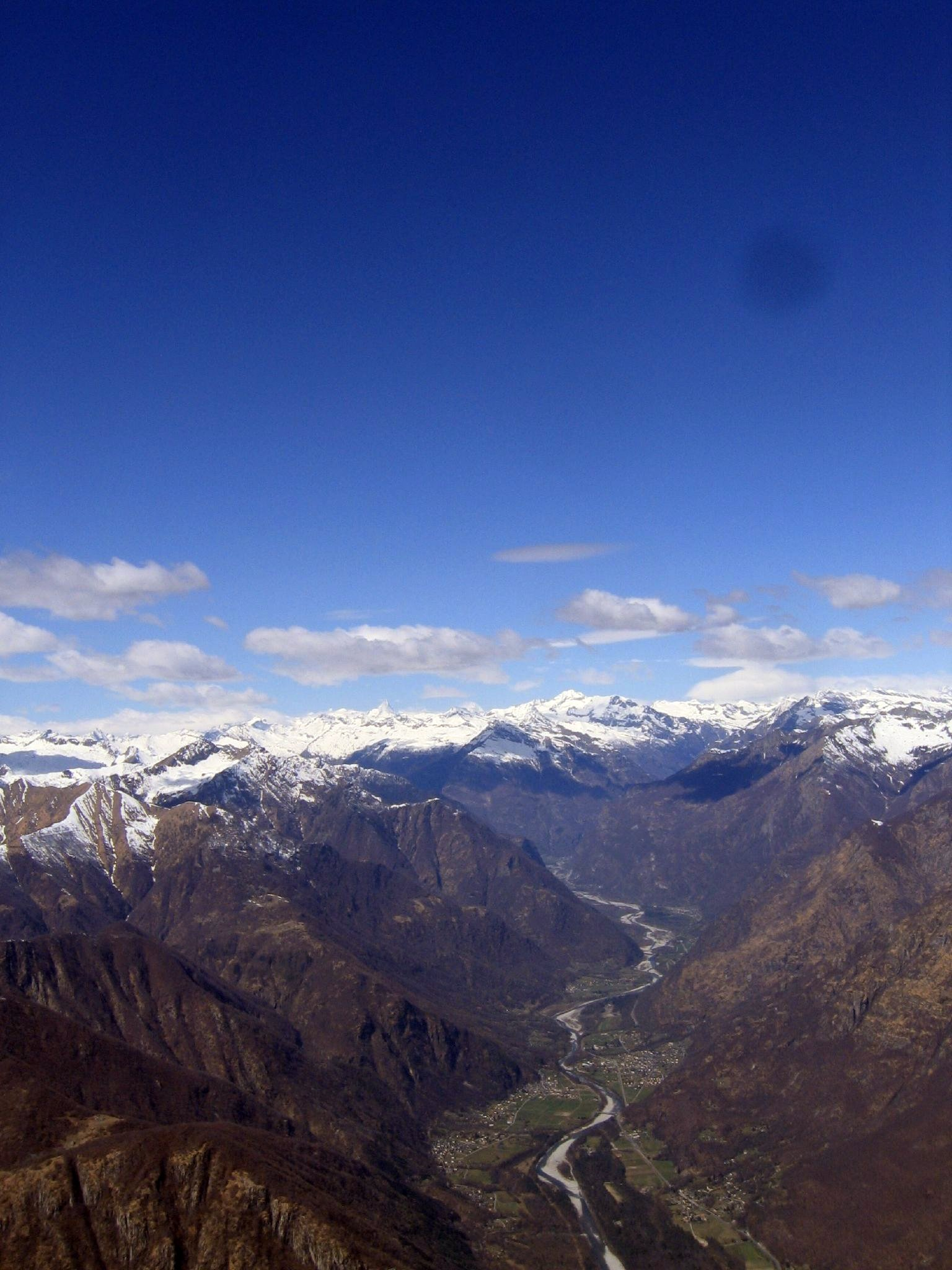
Aerial view of the Maggia Valley, with Maggia in the center on the right of the river

Aerial view (1954)

Maggia has an area, as of 1997, of 111.09 square kilometers (42.89 sq mi). Of this area, 0.79 km^{2} (0.31 sq mi) or 0.7% is used for agricultural purposes, while 14.29 km^{2} (5.52 sq mi) or 12.9% is forested. Of the rest of the land, 0.42 km^{2} (0.16 sq mi) or 0.4% is settled (buildings or roads), 0.42 km^{2} (0.16 sq mi) or 0.4% is either rivers or lakes and 7.48 km^{2} (2.89 sq mi) or 6.7% is unproductive land.

Of the built up area, housing and buildings made up 0.2% and transportation infrastructure made up 0.1%. Out of the forested land, 10.8% of the total land area is heavily forested and 1.2% is covered with orchards or small clusters of trees. Of the agricultural land, 0.4% is used for growing crops. All the water in the municipality is flowing water. Of the unproductive areas, 5.1% is unproductive vegetation and 1.7% is too rocky for vegetation.

The municipality is located in the Vallemaggia district. Since 2004 it consists of the villages of Maggia, Aurigeno, Coglio, Giumaglio, Lodano, Moghegno and Someo.

== Coat of arms ==
The blazon of the municipal coat of arms is Azure a fess wavy argent. The wavy line represents the Maggia river.

== Demographics ==
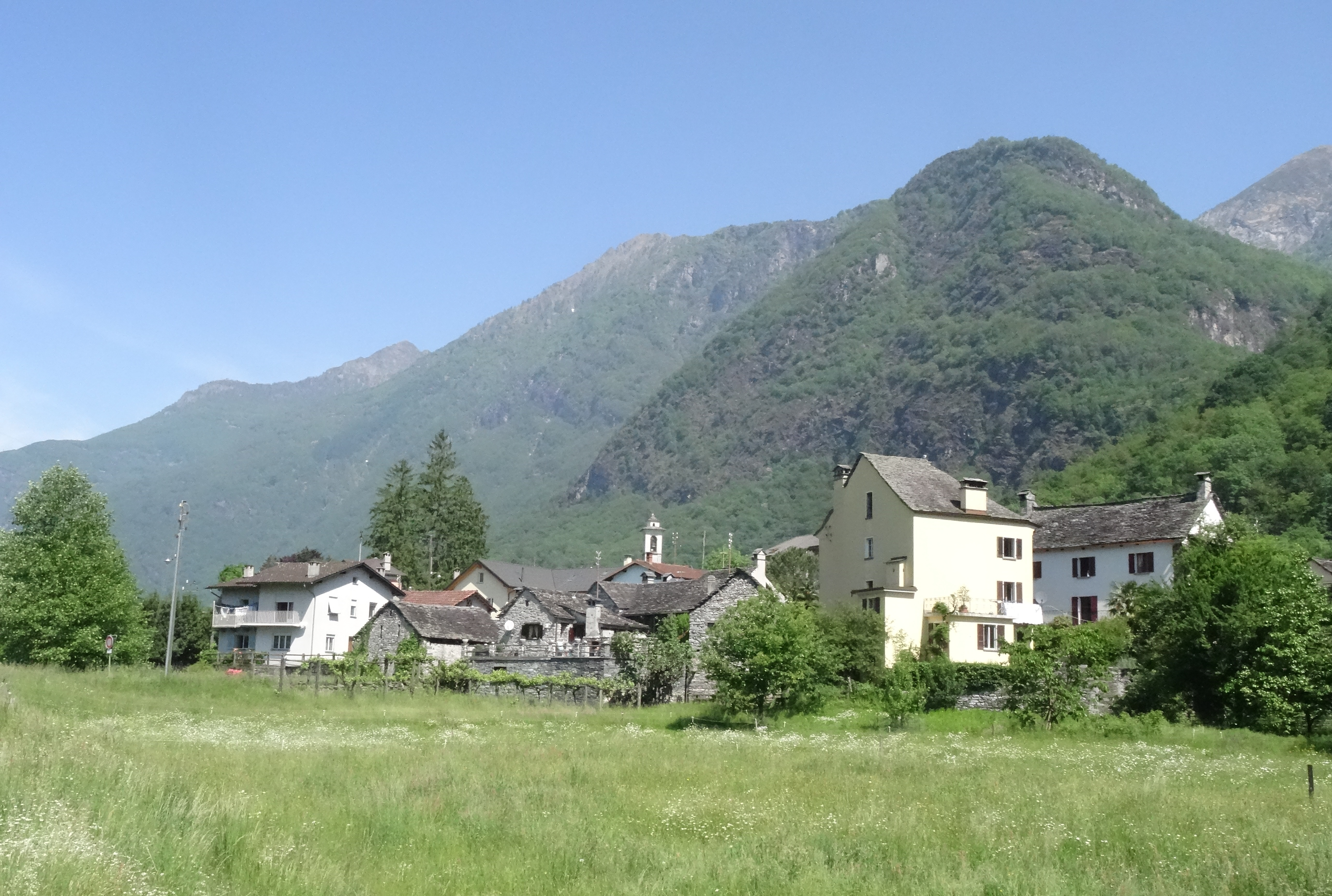
Coglio village in the municipality

Maggia has a population (as of December 2020) of 2,611. As of 2008, 10.9% of the population are resident foreign nationals.

Most of the population (as of 2000) speaks Italian language (752 or 88.5%), with German being second most common (59 or 6.9%) and Spanish being third (10 or 1.2%). There are 9 people who speak French and 1 person who speaks Romansh.

As of 2008, the gender distribution of the population was 48.8% male and 51.2% female. The population was made up of 1,045 Swiss men (42.6% of the population), and 152 (6.2%) non-Swiss men. There were 1,143 Swiss women (46.6%), and 115 (4.7%) non-Swiss women. Of the population in the municipality 306 or about 36.0% were born in Maggia and lived there in 2000. There were 260 or 30.6% who were born in the same canton, while 82 or 9.6% were born somewhere else in Switzerland, and 145 or 17.1% were born outside of Switzerland.

In 2008 there were 14 live births to Swiss citizens and 1 birth to non-Swiss citizens, and in same time span there were 19 deaths of Swiss citizens and 3 non-Swiss citizen deaths. Ignoring immigration and emigration, the population of Swiss citizens decreased by 5 while the foreign population decreased by 2. There were 2 Swiss men who emigrated from Switzerland. At the same time, there were 7 non-Swiss men and 8 non-Swiss women who immigrated from another country to Switzerland. The total Swiss population change in 2008 (from all sources, including moves across municipal borders) was a decrease of 2 and the non-Swiss population change was an increase of 3 people. This represents a population growth rate of 0.0%.

The age distribution, as of 2009, in Maggia is; 223 children or 9.1% of the population are between 0 and 9 years old and 274 teenagers or 11.2% are between 10 and 19. Of the adult population, 243 people or 9.9% of the population are between 20 and 29 years old. 285 people or 11.6% are between 30 and 39, 414 people or 16.9% are between 40 and 49, and 360 people or 14.7% are between 50 and 59. The senior population distribution is 313 people or 12.7% of the population are between 60 and 69 years old, 187 people or 7.6% are between 70 and 79, there are 156 people or 6.4% who are over 80.

As of 2000, there were 367 people who were single and never married in the municipality. There were 370 married individuals, 70 widows or widowers and 43 individuals who are divorced.

There were 103 households that consist of only one person and 19 households with five or more people. Out of a total of 316 households that answered this question, 32.6% were households made up of just one person and 4 were adults who lived with their parents. Of the rest of the households, there are 61 married couples without children, 114 married couples with children There were 29 single parents with a child or children. There were 3 households that were made up unrelated people and 2 households that were made some sort of institution or another collective housing.

In 2000 there were 312 single family homes (or 77.6% of the total) out of a total of 402 inhabited buildings. There were 75 multi-family buildings (18.7%), along with 9 multi-purpose buildings that were mostly used for housing (2.2%) and 6 other use buildings (commercial or industrial) that also had some housing (1.5%). Of the single family homes 15 were built before 1919, while 22 were built between 1990 and 2000. The greatest number of single family homes (134) were built between 1919 and 1945.

In 2000 there were 514 apartments in the municipality. The most common apartment size was 4 rooms of which there were 146. There were 39 single room apartments and 124 apartments with five or more rooms. Of these apartments, a total of 312 apartments (60.7% of the total) were permanently occupied, while 201 apartments (39.1%) were seasonally occupied and 1 apartment (0.2%) was empty.

The historical population is given in the following chart:

== Heritage sites of national significance ==
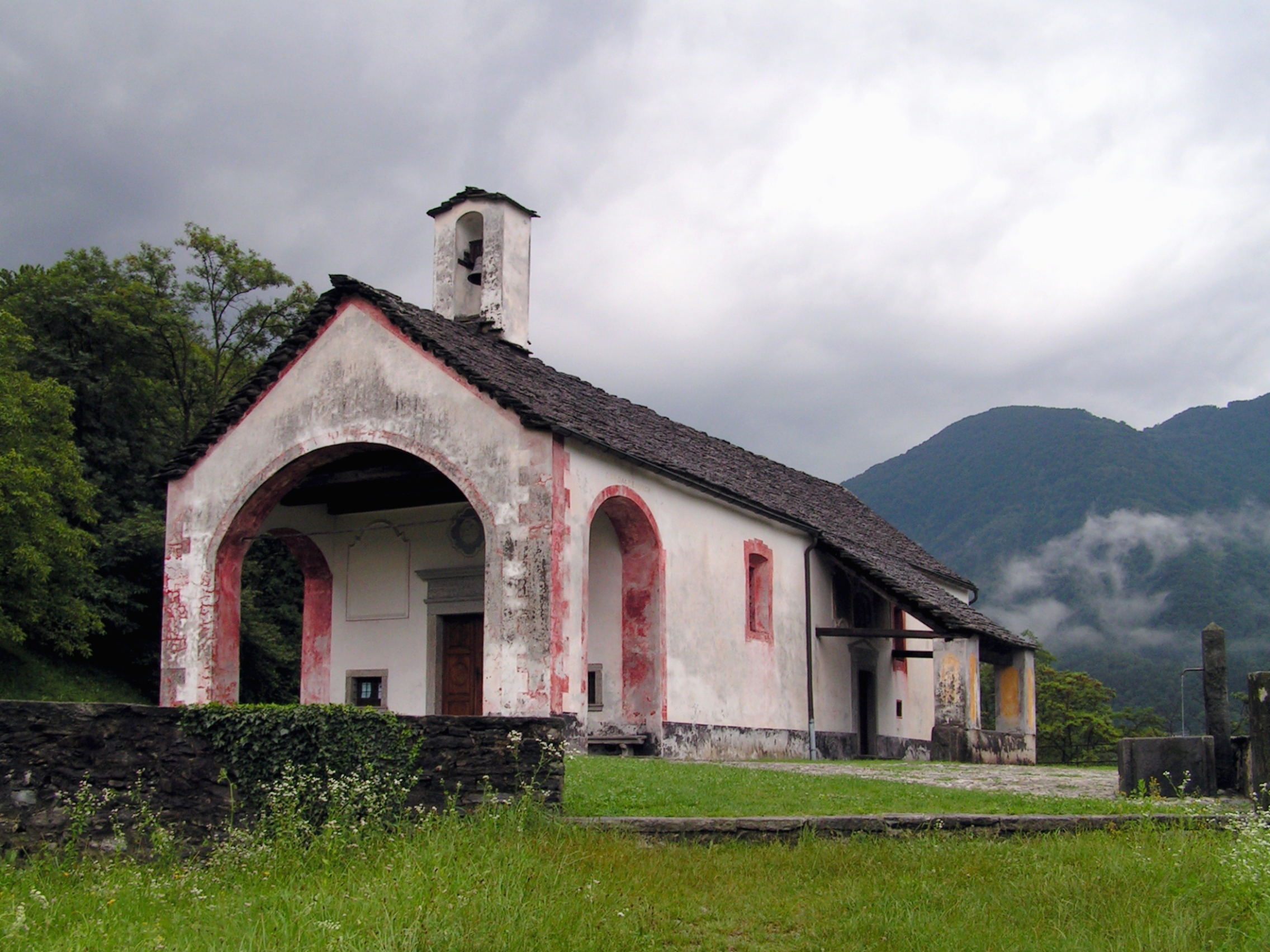
The Church of S. Maria Delle Grazie

The Church of S. Maria Delle Grazie, in Campagna is listed as Swiss heritage site of national significance. The entire villages of Aurigeno, Moghegno and Someo are part of the Inventory of Swiss Heritage Sites.

=== Sights ===
Maggia central tourist draws include: beaches on the banks of the Maggia River; Vallemaggia's largest carnival celebration; the 16th-century Santa Maria Maggiore church; the Centoscalini church; its COOP grocery store; and the AC Vallemaggia football club.

== Sports ==
Maggia also boasts of its successful football club AC Vallemaggia, which play in the Seconda Lega Regionale of FTC, the fifth-highest level in Switzerland. Recently the club spent a season in a superior category and reach the final of the Ticino Cup. The Club was a merger of AC Maggia and lower division teams AC Centrovalle and FC Avegno.

In 2005 a team representing Maggia took part of Jeux Sans Frontiérs, a European game show. The team placed third, the second highest performance for a Swiss Team in Jeux Sans Frontiérs history.

Boston Red Sox player, Dustin Pedroia, is of Swiss origin, with roots in the village of Maggia.

== Politics ==
In the 2007 federal election the most popular party was the FDP which received 34.58% of the vote. The next three most popular parties were the CVP (24.89%), the SP (15.53%) and the Ticino League (12.4%). In the federal election, a total of 766 votes were cast, and the voter turnout was 44.9%.

In the 2007 Gran Consiglio election, there were a total of 1,709 registered voters in Maggia, of which 1,103 or 64.5% voted. 9 blank ballots were cast, leaving 1,094 valid ballots in the election. The most popular party was the PLRT which received 247 or 22.6% of the vote. The next three most popular parties were; the PPD+GenGiova (with 232 or 21.2%), the SSI (with 221 or 20.2%) and the PS (with 168 or 15.4%).

In the 2007 Consiglio di Stato election, 9 blank ballots and 3 null ballots were cast, leaving 1,091 valid ballots in the election. The most popular party was the PLRT which received 243 or 22.3% of the vote. The next three most popular parties were; the PPD (with 235 or 21.5%), the LEGA (with 205 or 18.8%) and the PS (with 200 or 18.3%).

== Economy ==
There were 369 residents of the municipality who were employed in some capacity, of which females made up 42.0% of the workforce.

In 2008 the total number of full-time equivalent jobs was 440. The number of jobs in the primary sector was 26, all of which were in agriculture. The number of jobs in the secondary sector was 172, of which 50 or (29.1%) were in manufacturing, 52 or (30.2%) were in mining and 71 (41.3%) were in construction. The number of jobs in the tertiary sector was 242. In the tertiary sector; 48 or 19.8% were in wholesale or retail sales or the repair of motor vehicles, 12 or 5.0% were in the movement and storage of goods, 43 or 17.8% were in a hotel or restaurant, 11 or 4.5% were the insurance or financial industry, 11 or 4.5% were technical professionals or scientists, 22 or 9.1% were in education and 69 or 28.5% were in health care.

In 2000, there were 108 workers who commuted into the municipality and 237 workers who commuted away. The municipality is a net exporter of workers, with about 2.2 workers leaving the municipality for every one entering. About 8.3% of the workforce coming into Maggia are coming from outside Switzerland.

As of 2009, there were 5 hotels in Maggia with a total of 37 rooms and 78 beds.

== Religion ==
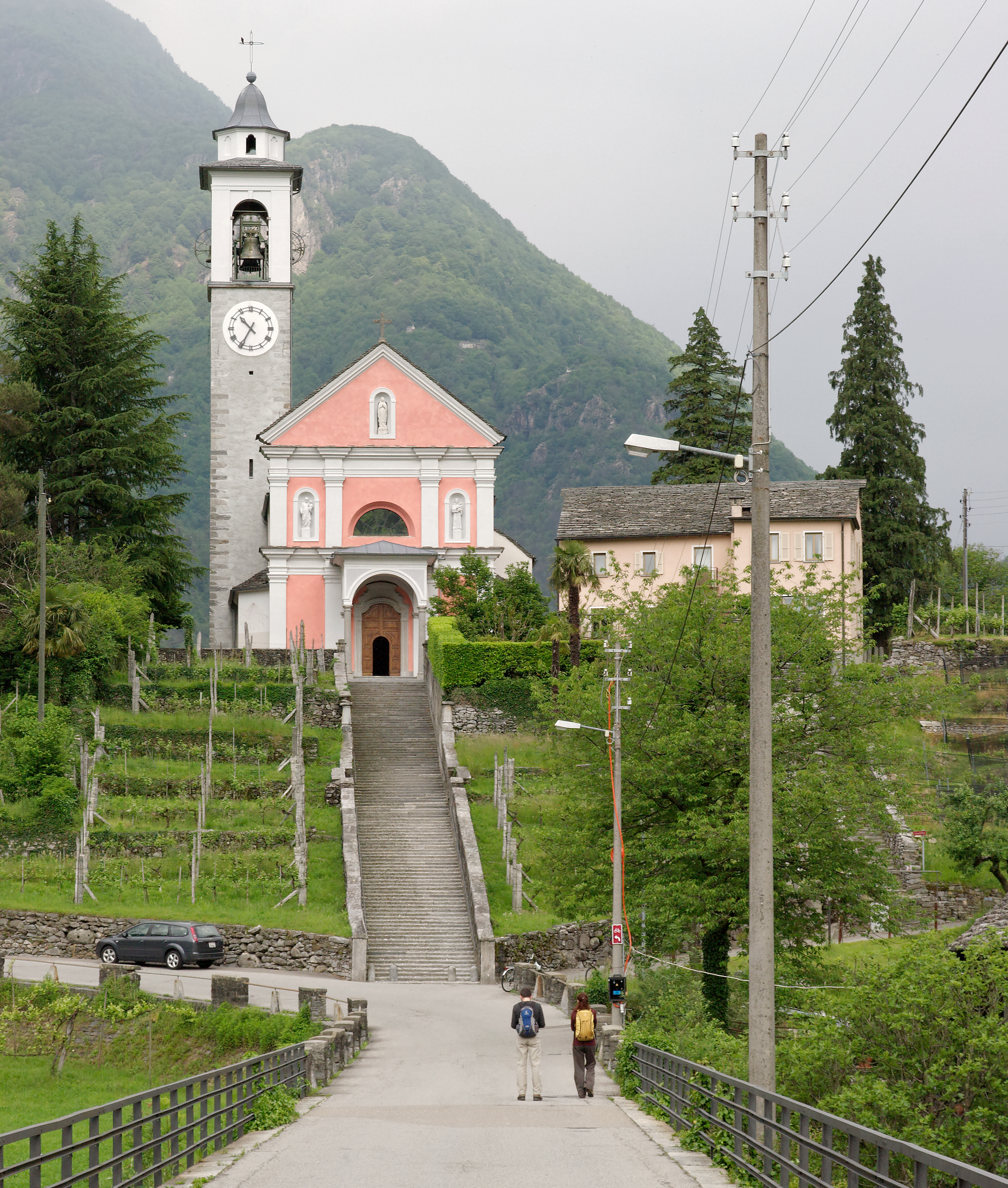
The parish church of San Maurizio

From the 2000 census, 683 or 80.4% were Roman Catholic, while 40 or 4.7% belonged to the Swiss Reformed Church. Of the rest of the population, there were 2 members of an Orthodox church (or about 0.24% of the population), there were 5 individuals (or about 0.59% of the population) who belonged to the Christian Catholic Church, and there were 3 individuals (or about 0.35% of the population) who belonged to another Christian church. There was 1 individual who was Islamic. 38 (or about 4.47% of the population) belonged to no church, are agnostic or atheist, and 78 individuals (or about 9.18% of the population) did not answer the question.

== Education ==
In Maggia about 309 or (36.4%) of the population have completed non-mandatory upper secondary education, and 71 or (8.4%) have completed additional higher education (either university or a Fachhochschule). Of the 71 who completed tertiary schooling, 60.6% were Swiss men, 29.6% were Swiss women, 8.5% were non-Swiss men.

In Maggia there were a total of 404 students (as of 2009). The Ticino education system provides up to three years of non-mandatory kindergarten and in Maggia there were 54 children in kindergarten. The primary school program lasts for five years and includes both a standard school and a special school. In the municipality, 124 students attended the standard primary schools and 5 students attended the special school. In the lower secondary school system, students either attend a two-year middle school followed by a two-year pre-apprenticeship or they attend a four-year program to prepare for higher education. There were 101 students in the two-year middle school and 2 in their pre-apprenticeship, while 30 students were in the four-year advanced program.

The upper secondary school includes several options, but at the end of the upper secondary program, a student will be prepared to enter a trade or to continue on to a university or college. In Ticino, vocational students may either attend school while working on their internship or apprenticeship (which takes three or four years) or may attend school followed by an internship or apprenticeship (which takes one year as a full-time student or one and a half to two years as a part-time student). There were 26 vocational students who were attending school full-time and 54 who attend part-time.

The professional program lasts three years and prepares a student for a job in engineering, nursing, computer science, business, tourism and similar fields. There were 8 students in the professional program.

As of 2000, there was 1 student in Maggia who came from another municipality, while 119 residents attended schools outside the municipality.
