= Isorno =

- Former municipality
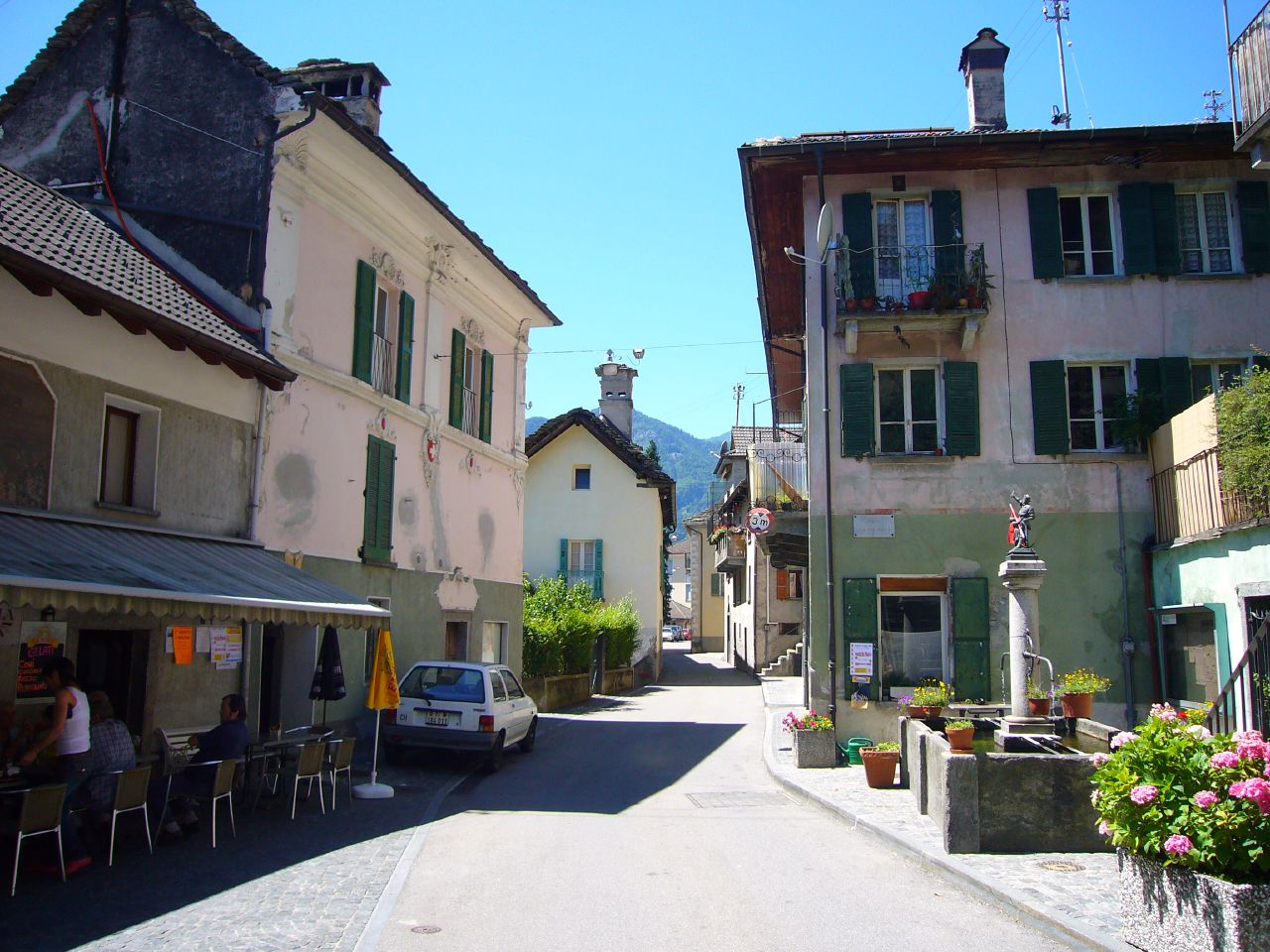

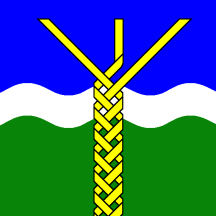
- Flag Coat of arms
- Location of Isorno
- Location within Switzerland Location within Canton of Ticino
- Coordinates: 46°12′N 8°40′E
- Country: Switzerland
- Canton: Ticino
- District: Locarno

Government
  - Mayor: Sindaco

Area
  - Total: 17.1 km^{2} (6.6 sq mi)
- Elevation: 678 m (2,224 ft)

Population (December 2004)
  - Total: 341
  - Density: 19.9/km^{2} (51.6/sq mi)
- Time zone: UTC+01:00 (CET)
  - Summer (DST): UTC+02:00 (CEST)
- Postal code: 6661
- SFOS number: 5137
- ISO 3166 code: CH-TI
- Localities: Auressio, Berzona, Loco, Niva, Rossa, Seghellina
- Surrounded by: Cavigliano, Intragna, Maggia, Mosogno, Onsernone
- Website: SFSO statistics

Isorno is a former municipality in the district of Locarno in the canton of Ticino in Switzerland. On 10 April 2016 the former municipalities of Vergeletto, Gresso, Mosogno and Isorno merged into the municipality of Onsernone.

The former municipality was created in 2001 by a merger of Auressio, Berzona and Loco.

== History ==
Auressio is first mentioned in 1233 as Oraxio. Berzona is first mentioned in 1265 as Berzona. Loco is first mentioned in 1224 as Loco and was also known as Luogo.

=== Auressio ===
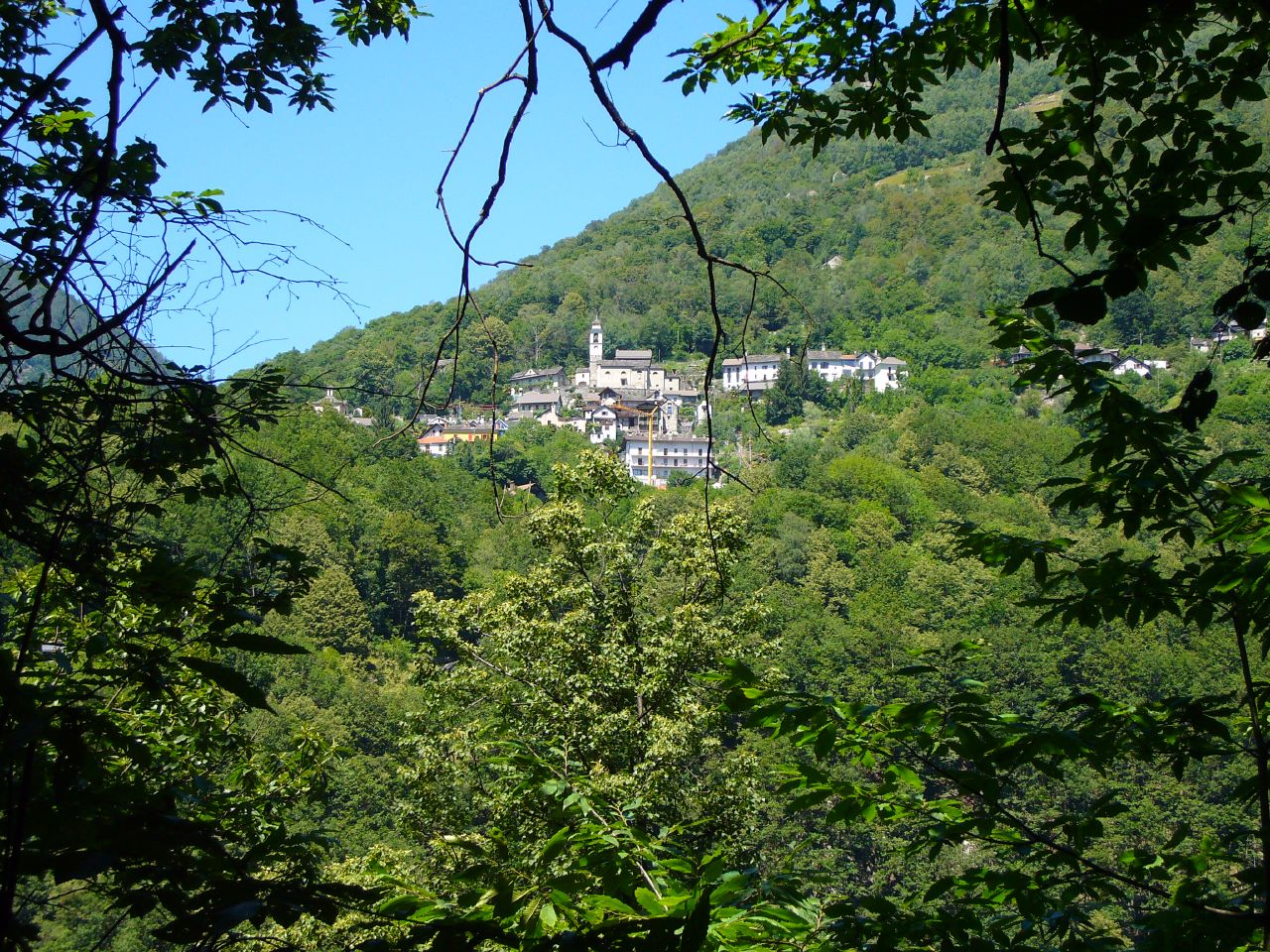
Auressio village

Until the 19th century, the village had much closer ties to Piedmont than to the rest of the Onsernone valley. The construction of the road through the valley in the 19th century brought it closer to the rest of the valley.

The church of S. Antonio Abate was finished in 1526 and became the center of an independent parish in 1792 after it separated from Loco.

After World War II farming and grazing were almost abandoned and replaced by short-term, seasonal emigration. The improved transport links to the nearby town of Locarno increased Auressio's attractiveness as a place to live for those that were employed in Locarno. This led to a clear population increase in recent years.

One notable building in Auressio is the Villa Edera, which was built in 1887, for the Paris impresario Paolo Antonio Calzonio. It was restored in the early 1990s by the municipality and is now used as a hostel.

=== Berzona ===
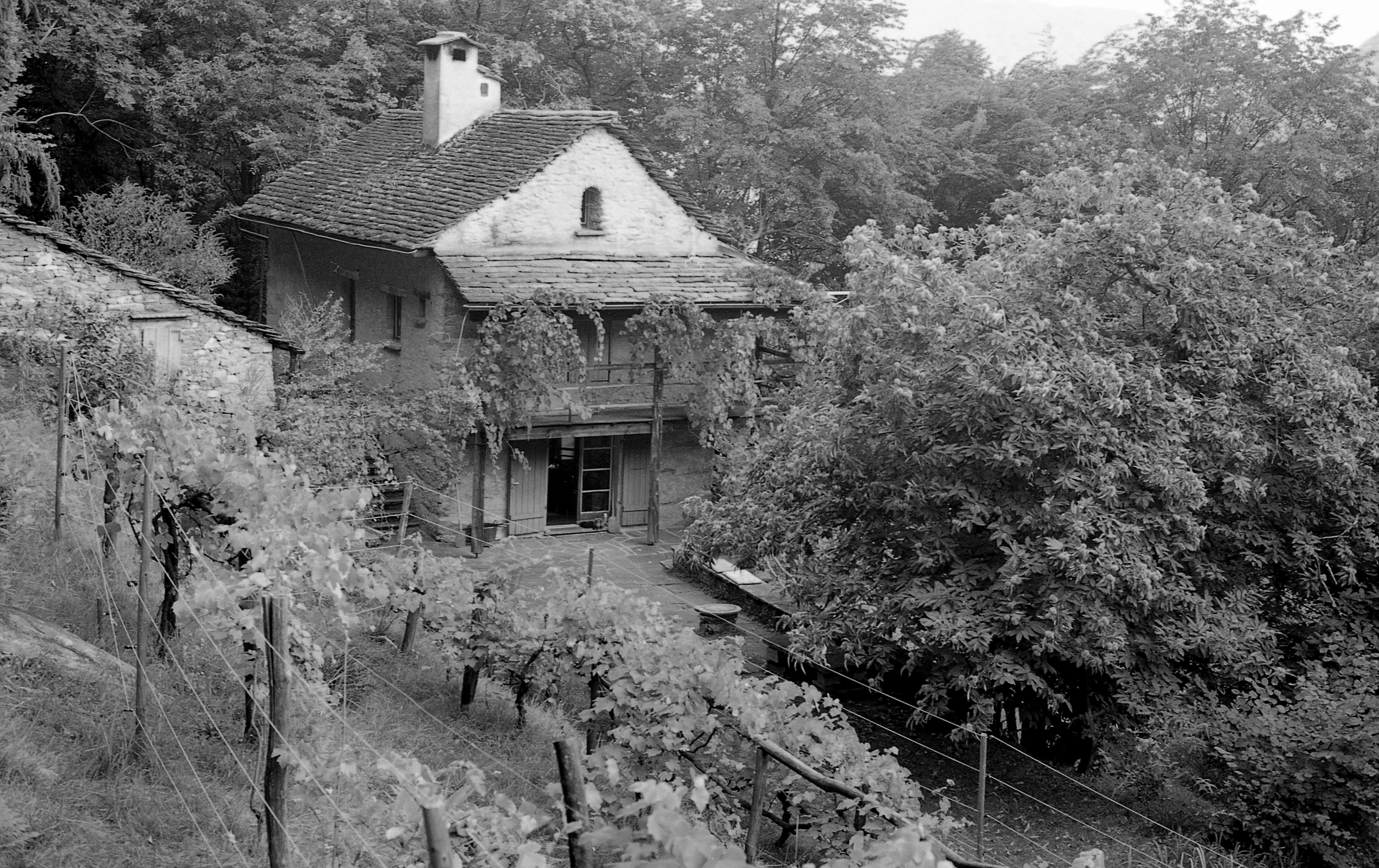
House near Berzona

The village section of Seghelina is located directly on the main road, while the main village of Berzona is above the road. During the Middle Ages it was part of the Squadra of Onsernone.

The church of S. Defendente was built in 1564 and became a parish church when it separated from Loco in 1777. The section of Seghelina has the chapels of Santa Maria (1682) and S. Maria Lauretana (1766). The political municipality was created at the same time as the Canton of Ticino in 1803.

After World War II, much of the village population emigrated and sold their properties to outsiders. Many people who bought houses in Berzona were well known personalities from the arts and culture, such as Alfred Andersch, Golo Mann and Max Frisch. Today, the village is shrinking as few jobs in farming and grazing remain and most of the working population have moved to Locarno.

=== Loco ===
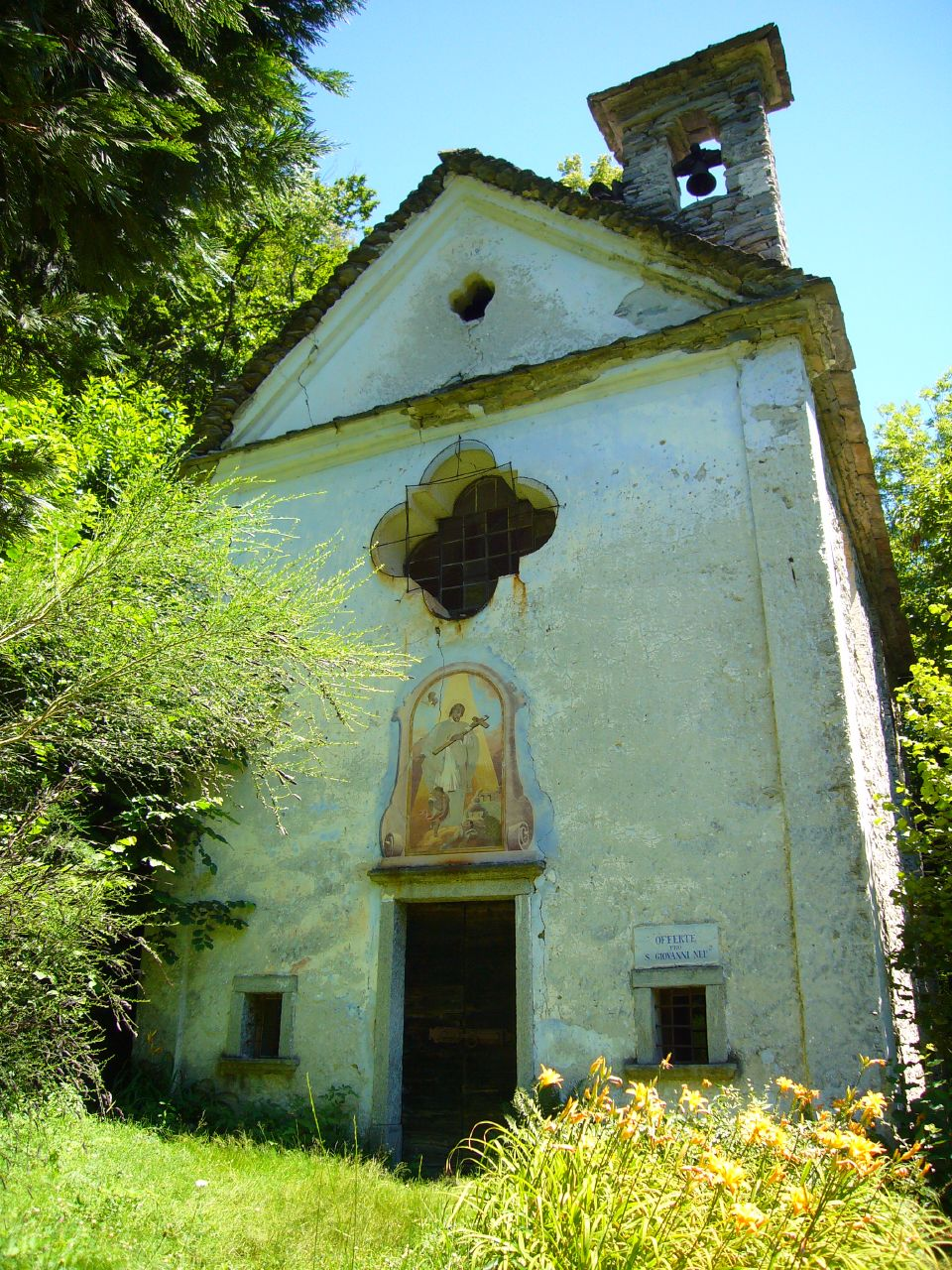
Chapel of St. John Nepomuk

Loco also contained the hamlets of Niva and Rossa.

From the Middle Ages until the end of the Ancien Régime Loco was the capital of the old Onsernone valley community.

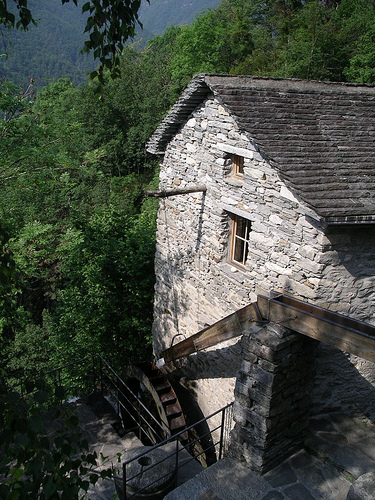
Historic old mill of Loco, now a museum

The parish church of San Remigio was the mother church of the valley and ancient seat of the Vicariate of Onsernone valley. It is first mentioned in 1228 (in the municipal archives), but is probably older. In the early 16th century it was rebuilt and acquired its current steeple. It houses the Holy Cross chapel with an ancient, venerated cross relic. The church is also the home of a Last Supper painting by the Flemish painter Godefridus Maes from 1683. In the hamlet of Niva, there is a late baroque chapel of St. John Nepomuk. The chapel in Sassello is from the late 17th century and is dedicated to the Madonna of Re.

In the 19th century, Loco was a center of the straw braiding for hats, bags and other articles. The straw braids that were used for this purpose were produced in the other villages of the Onsernone valley.

In addition to the typical houses with balconies, a number of aristocratic mansions are located in the village. These include the Casa Broggini (built 1708) in Rossa.

The primary school for the area is located in Loco, along with the Onsernonese Museum (opened 1966) and the renovated retirement home of the Onsernone valley. Near Loco, in a restored mill, there is a permanent exhibition on the grain milling in the area. Casa Shira (built in the 19th century, now owned by the community) has a small public library and a hostel.

At the beginning of the 21st century the majority of the workers commuted to Locarno.

== Geography ==
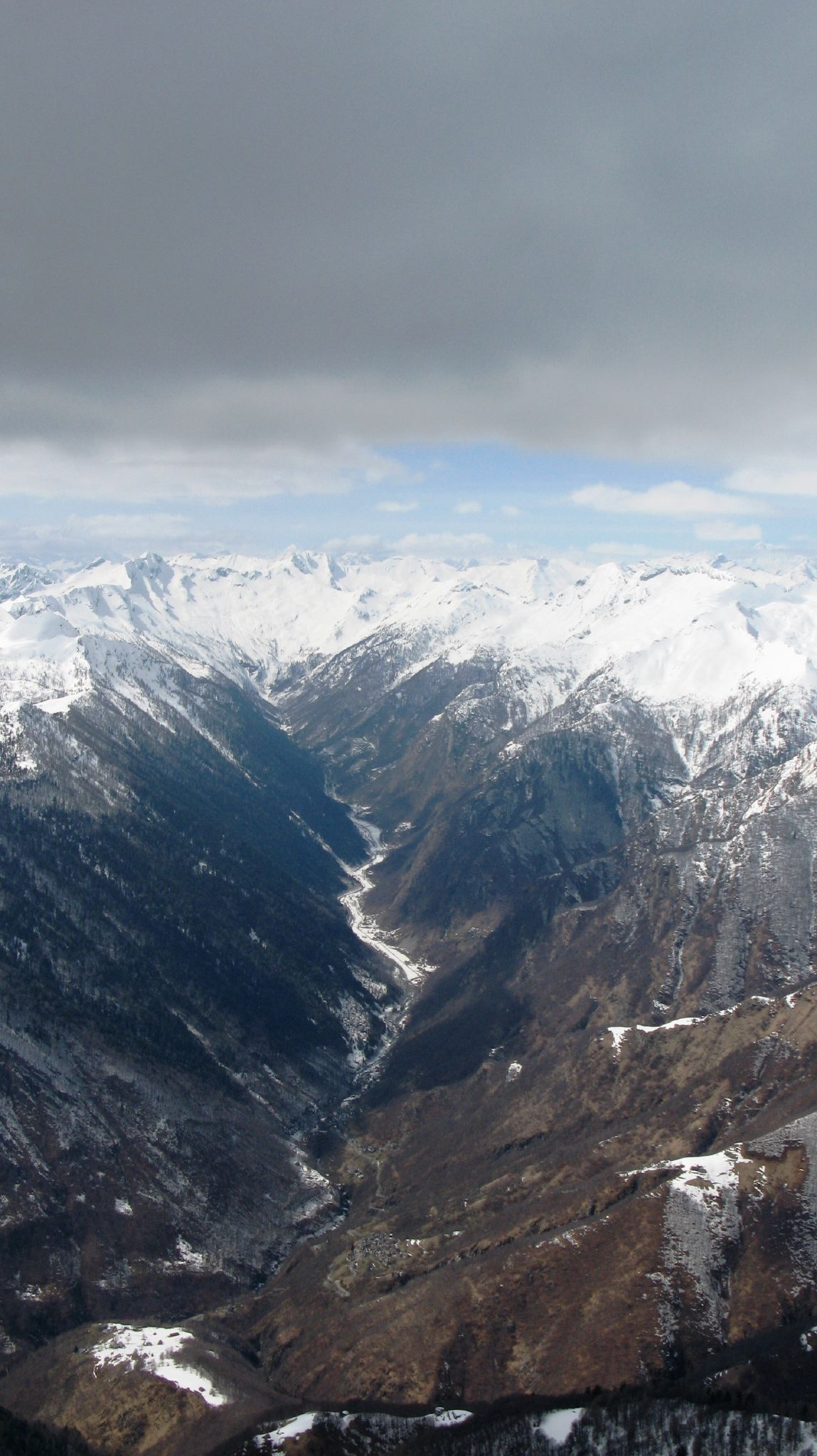
Orsernone valley

Isorno had an area, as of 2006, of 17.1 square kilometers (6.6 sq mi). Of this area, 8.4% is used for agricultural purposes, while 73.2% is forested. Of the rest of the land, 0.9% is settled (buildings or roads) and 17.5% is unproductive land.

The former municipality is located in the Locarno district, in the Onsernone valley along the Isone river. It consists of the villages of Auressio, Berzona and Loco.

== Coat of arms ==
The blazon of the municipal coat of arms is Per fess azure and vert a bar wavy argent and overall issuant from base three ribbons or interwoven ending in pall couped in chief. The new coat of arms symbolizes the merger, each thread of the twisted cord representing a former municipality.

== Demographics ==
Isorno had a population (as of 2014) of 317. As of 2008, 11.1% of the population are resident foreign nationals. Over the last 10 years (1997–2007) the population has changed at a rate of -6.5%.

Most of the population (as of 2000) speaks Italian (70.0%), with German being second most common (20.9%) and French being third (8.0%).

As of 2008, the gender distribution of the population was 48.7% male and 51.3% female. The population was made up of 148 Swiss men (42.2% of the population), and 23 (6.6%) non-Swiss men. There were 163 Swiss women (46.4%), and 17 (4.8%) non-Swiss women.

In 2008 there were 4 live births to Swiss citizens and were 4 deaths of Swiss citizens. Ignoring immigration and emigration, the population of Swiss citizens remained the same while the foreign population remained the same. There was 1 Swiss man who emigrated from Switzerland. At the same time, there were 4 non-Swiss men and 3 non-Swiss women who immigrated from another country to Switzerland. The total Swiss population change in 2008 (from all sources, including moves across municipal borders) was an increase of 3 and the non-Swiss population change was an increase of 1 people. This represents a population growth rate of 1.2%.

The age distribution, as of 2009, in Isorno is; 31 children or 8.8% of the population are between 0 and 9 years old and 28 teenagers or 8.0% are between 10 and 19. Of the adult population, 31 people or 8.8% of the population are between 20 and 29 years old. 40 people or 11.4% are between 30 and 39, 51 people or 14.5% are between 40 and 49, and 70 people or 19.9% are between 50 and 59. The senior population distribution is 44 people or 12.5% of the population are between 60 and 69 years old, 27 people or 7.7% are between 70 and 79, there are 29 people or 8.3% who are over 80.

== Economy ==
As of 2007, Isorno had an unemployment rate of 2.45%. As of 2005, there were 14 people employed in the primary economic sector and about 7 businesses involved in this sector. 5 people were employed in the secondary sector and there were 3 businesses in this sector. 58 people were employed in the tertiary sector, with 13 businesses in this sector.

Of the working population, 6.3% used public transportation to get to work, and 47.2% used a private car.

As of 2009, there were 2 hotels in Isorno.

== Housing ==
As of 2000 the average number of residents per living room was 0.52 which is fewer people per room than the cantonal average of 0.6 per room. In this case, a room is defined as space of a housing unit of at least 4 m^{2} (43 sq ft) as normal bedrooms, dining rooms, living rooms, kitchens and habitable cellars and attics. About 59.5% of the total households were owner occupied, or in other words did not pay rent (though they may have a mortgage or a rent-to-own agreement).

As of 2000, there were 159 private households in the municipality, and an average of 2.1 persons per household. The vacancy rate for the municipality, in 2008, was 1.45%. As of 2007, the construction rate of new housing units was 0 new units per 1000 residents.

== Historic Population ==
The historical population is given in the following table:

Year	Population Auressio	Population Berzona	Population Loco
1795	240	306	684
1808	273	286	689
1850	198	235	600
1900	164	151	402
1950	76	84	258
2000	71	48	254

== Heritage sites of national significance ==
The Museo Onsernonese is listed as a Swiss heritage site of national significance. The entire villages of Auressio, Berzona and Loco are listed in the Inventory of Swiss Heritage Sites.

== Politics ==
In the 2007 federal election the most popular party was the FDP which received 23.58% of the vote. The next three most popular parties were the SP (21.34%), the CVP (17.46%) and the Green Party (15.97%). In the federal election, a total of 88 votes were cast, and the voter turnout was 33.6%.

In the 2007 Gran Consiglio election, there were a total of 267 registered voters in Isorno, of which 119 or 44.6% voted. 2 blank ballots and 1 null ballot were cast, leaving 116 valid ballots in the election. The most popular party was the PLRT which received 25 or 21.6% of the vote. The next two most popular parties were; the SSI (with 24 or 20.7%) and the PPD+GenGiova (with 16 or 13.8%).

In the 2007 Consiglio di Stato election, 2 blank ballots were cast, leaving 117 valid ballots in the election. The most popular party was the PS which received 30 or 25.6% of the vote. The next three most popular parties were; the SSI (with 27 or 23.1%), the PLRT (with 23 or 19.7%) and the PPD (with 17 or 14.5%).

== Education ==
The entire Swiss population is generally well educated. In Isorno about 64.1% of the population (between age 25 and 64) have completed either non-mandatory upper secondary education or additional higher education (either university or a Fachhochschule).

In Isorno there were a total of 46 students (as of 2009). The Ticino education system provides up to three years of non-mandatory kindergarten and in Isorno there were 10 children in kindergarten. The primary school program lasts for five years. In the village, 14 students attended the standard primary schools. In the lower secondary school system, students either attend a two-year middle school followed by a two-year pre-apprenticeship or they attend a four-year program to prepare for higher education. There were 14 students in the two-year middle school, while 0 students were in the four-year advanced program.

The upper secondary school includes several options, but at the end of the upper secondary program, a student will be prepared to enter a trade or to continue on to a university or college. In Ticino, vocational students may either attend school while working on their internship or apprenticeship (which takes three or four years) or may attend school followed by an internship or apprenticeship (which takes one year as a full-time student or one and a half to two years as a part-time student). There were 5 vocational students who were attending school full-time and 3 who attend part-time.
