= Moghegno =

Coordinates: 46°14′N 8°41′E

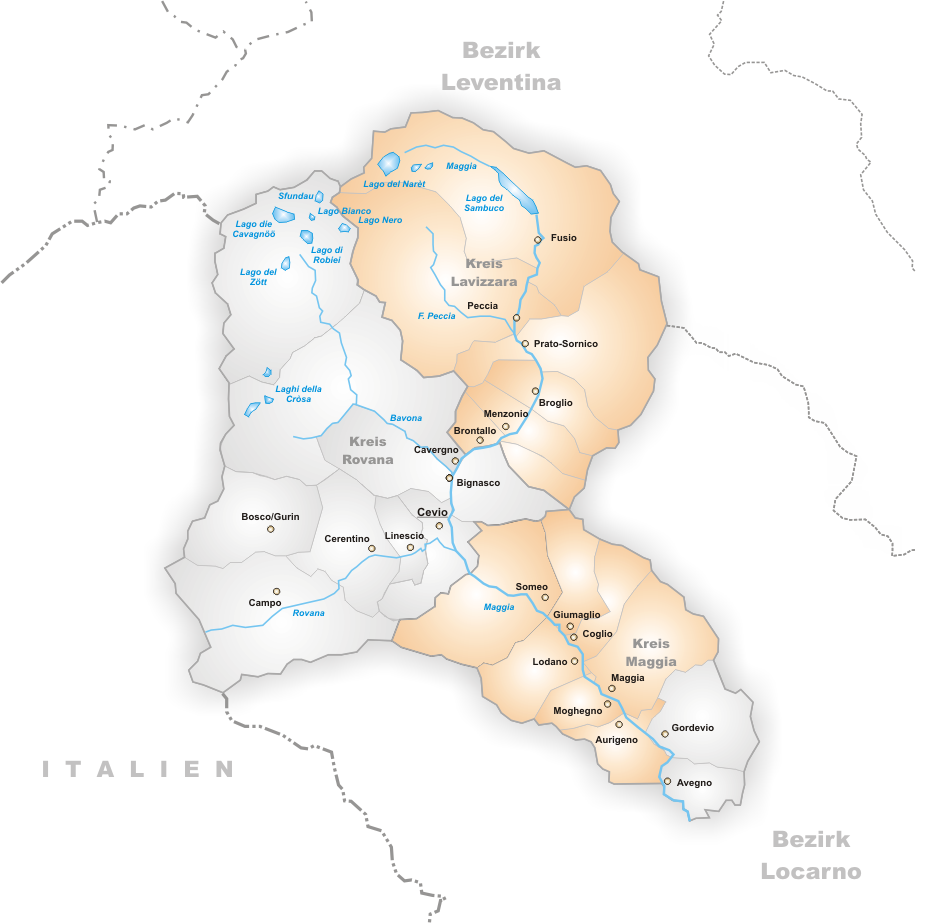
2003 map with Moghegno.

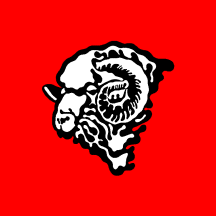
Flag of Moghegno.

Coat of arms of Moghegno.

Moghegno is a village and former municipality in the district of Vallemaggia in the canton of Ticino, Switzerland.

It was first recorded in 1335 as Mogeno.

The municipality had 300 inhabitants in 1761, which decreased to 294 in 1801. It then went up and down to 392 in 1850, 264 in 1900 and 205 in 1950. It then increased steadily to 275 in 1990, 336 in 2000 and 376 in 2003. The municipality had an area of 6.96 km^{2}.

In 2004 the municipality was incorporated into the larger, neighboring municipality Maggia.
