= Gresso =

- Former municipality
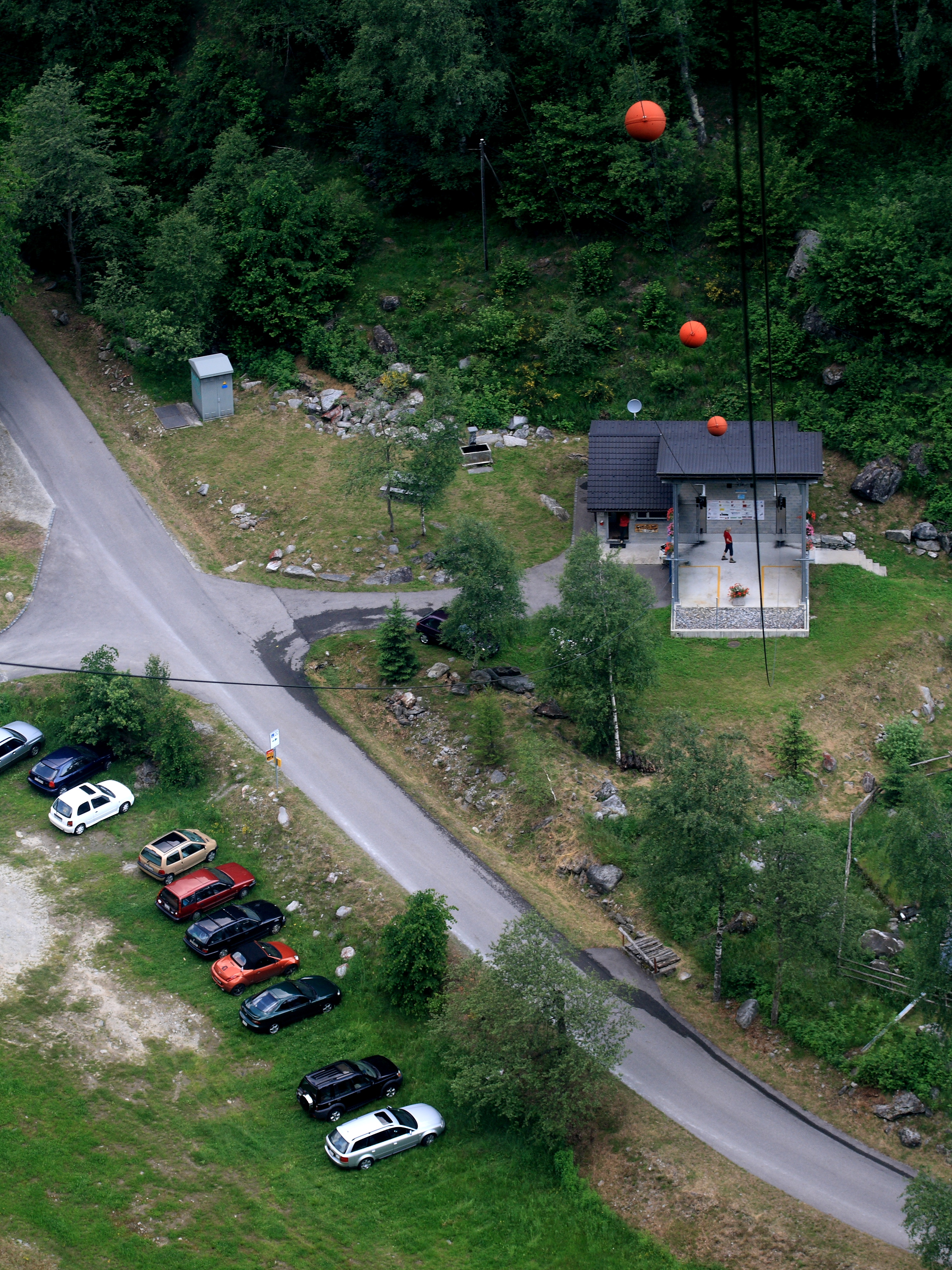

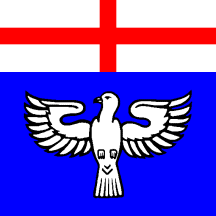
- Flag Coat of arms
- Location of Gresso
- Location within Switzerland Location within Canton of Ticino
- Coordinates: 46°13′N 8°37′E
- Country: Switzerland
- Canton: Ticino
- District: Locarno

Government
  - Mayor: Sindaco

Area
  - Total: 11.08 km^{2} (4.28 sq mi)
- Elevation: 996 m (3,268 ft)

Population (December 2004)
  - Total: 35
  - Density: 3.2/km^{2} (8.2/sq mi)
- Time zone: UTC+01:00 (CET)
  - Summer (DST): UTC+02:00 (CEST)
- Postal code: 6611
- SFOS number: 5109
- ISO 3166 code: CH-TI
- Surrounded by: Maggia, Onsernone, Vergeletto
- Website: SFSO statistics

Gresso is a former municipality in the district of Locarno in the canton of Ticino in Switzerland. The municipality was formed in 1882 by splitting from Vergeletto. On 10 April 2016 the former municipalities of Vergeletto, Gresso, Mosogno and Isorno merged into the municipality of Onsernone.

== History ==
The discovery of a Roman tomb from the 1st-2nd century AD, with pottery and coins, proves that Gresso was part of the outer-most reaches of the Vicus of Muralto. The modern village of Gresso is first mentioned in 1316 as Agrassio. Until 1803, Gresso was part of the Squadra of Russo (now Onsernone), one of five Squadre, that formed the medieval community of Onsernone.

The village church, called The Chapel of St. Orsola was built in 1703 and rebuilt in 1730. It was renovated in the late 20th century.

The village built its first drivable road in 1885.

== Geography ==
Gresso had an area, as of 1997, of 11.08 square kilometers (4.28 sq mi). Of this area, 0.17 km^{2} (0.066 sq mi) or 1.5% is used for agricultural purposes, while 6.77 km^{2} (2.61 sq mi) or 61.1% is forested. Of the rest of the land, 0.09 km^{2} (22 acres) or 0.8% is settled (buildings or roads), 0.19 km^{2} (0.073 sq mi) or 1.7% is either rivers or lakes and 1.77 km^{2} (0.68 sq mi) or 16.0% is unproductive land.

Of the built up area, housing and buildings made up 0.3% and transportation infrastructure made up 0.4%. Out of the forested land, 52.2% of the total land area is heavily forested and 5.7% is covered with orchards or small clusters of trees. Of the agricultural land, 1.3% is used for growing crops. All the water in the municipality is flowing water. Of the unproductive areas, 11.1% is unproductive vegetation and 4.9% is too rocky for vegetation.

The former municipality is located in the Locarno district, at an elevation of 999 m (3,278 ft) on the steep, left side of the Vergeletto valley.

== Coat of arms ==
The blazon of the municipal coat of arms is Azure a dove displayed argent and in a chief of the last a cross gules.

== Demographics ==
Gresso had a population (as of 2014) of 41. As of 2008, 3.7% of the population are resident foreign nationals. Over the last 10 years (1997–2007) the population has changed at a rate of -38.6%.

Most of the population (as of 2000) speaks Italian (94.3%), with German and French making up the rest (2.9% each). Of the Swiss national languages (as of 2000), 1 person speaks German, 1 person speaks French and 33 people speak Italian.

As of 2008, the gender distribution of the population was 50.0% male and 50.0% female. The population was made up of 15 Swiss men and 15 Swiss women.

The age distribution, as of 2009, in Gresso is; 2 children or 6.7% of the population are between 0 and 9 years old and there are no teenagers. Of the adult population, 1 person is between 20 and 29 years old. 4 people or 13.3% are between 30 and 39, 1 person is between 40 and 49, and 6 people or 20.0% are between 50 and 59. The senior population distribution is 7 people or 23.3% of the population are between 60 and 69 years old, 6 people or 20.0% are between 70 and 79, there are 3 people or 10.0% who are over 80.

As of 2000, there were 19 private households in the municipality, and an average of 1.8 persons per household. In 2000 there were 72 single family homes (or 88.9% of the total) out of a total of 81 inhabited buildings. There were 7 two family buildings (8.6%) and there were also 2 buildings in the municipality that were multipurpose buildings (used for both housing and commercial or another purpose).

The vacancy rate for the municipality, in 2008, was 0%. In 2000 there were 89 apartments in the municipality. The most common apartment size was the 2 room apartment of which there were 27. There were 4 single room apartments and 9 apartments with five or more rooms. Of these apartments, a total of 19 apartments (21.3% of the total) were permanently occupied, while 69 apartments (77.5%) were seasonally occupied and 1 apartment (1.1%) was empty. As of 2007, the construction rate of new housing units was 0 new units per 1000 residents.

The historical population is given in the following table:

year	population
1888	290
1900	278
1950	139
1970	68
1990	48
2000	35

== Sights ==
The entire village of Gresso is designated as part of the Inventory of Swiss Heritage Sites.

== Politics ==
In the 2007 federal election the most popular party was the FDP which received 57.74% of the vote. The next three most popular parties were the SP (27.98%), the Ticino League (9.52%) and the CVP (4.76%). In the federal election, a total of 21 votes were cast, and the voter turnout was 58.3%.

In the 2007 Gran Consiglio election, there were a total of 37 registered voters in Gresso, of which 19 or 51.4% voted. The most popular party was the PLRT which received 13 or 68.4% of the vote. The next two most popular parties were; the PS (with 4 or 21.1%), the PPD+GenGiova (with 1 or 5.3%).

In the 2007 Consiglio di Stato election, The most popular party was the PLRT which received 13 or 68.4% of the vote. The next two most popular parties were; the PS (with 4 or 21.1%), the LEGA (with 1 or 5.3%).

== Economy ==
As of 2007, Gresso had an unemployment rate of 4.49%. As of 2005, no one was employed in the primary economic sectoror the secondary sector. 1 person was employed in the tertiary sector, with 1 business in this sector. There were 12 residents of the municipality who were employed in some capacity, of which females made up 58.3% of the workforce.

In 2000, there were 8 workers who commuted away from the municipality. Of the working population, 16.7% used public transportation to get to work, and 50% used a private car.

== Religion ==
From the 2000 census, 32 or 91.4% were Roman Catholic, while or 0.0% belonged to the Swiss Reformed Church. There are 1 individuals (or about 2.86% of the population) who belong to another church (not listed on the census), and 2 individuals (or about 5.71% of the population) did not answer the question.

== Education ==
The entire Swiss population is generally well educated. In Gresso about 64.7% of the population (between age 25–64) have completed either non-mandatory upper secondary education or additional higher education (either university or a Fachhochschule).

As of 2000, there were 2 students from Gresso who attended schools outside the municipality.
