= Mosogno =

- Former municipality
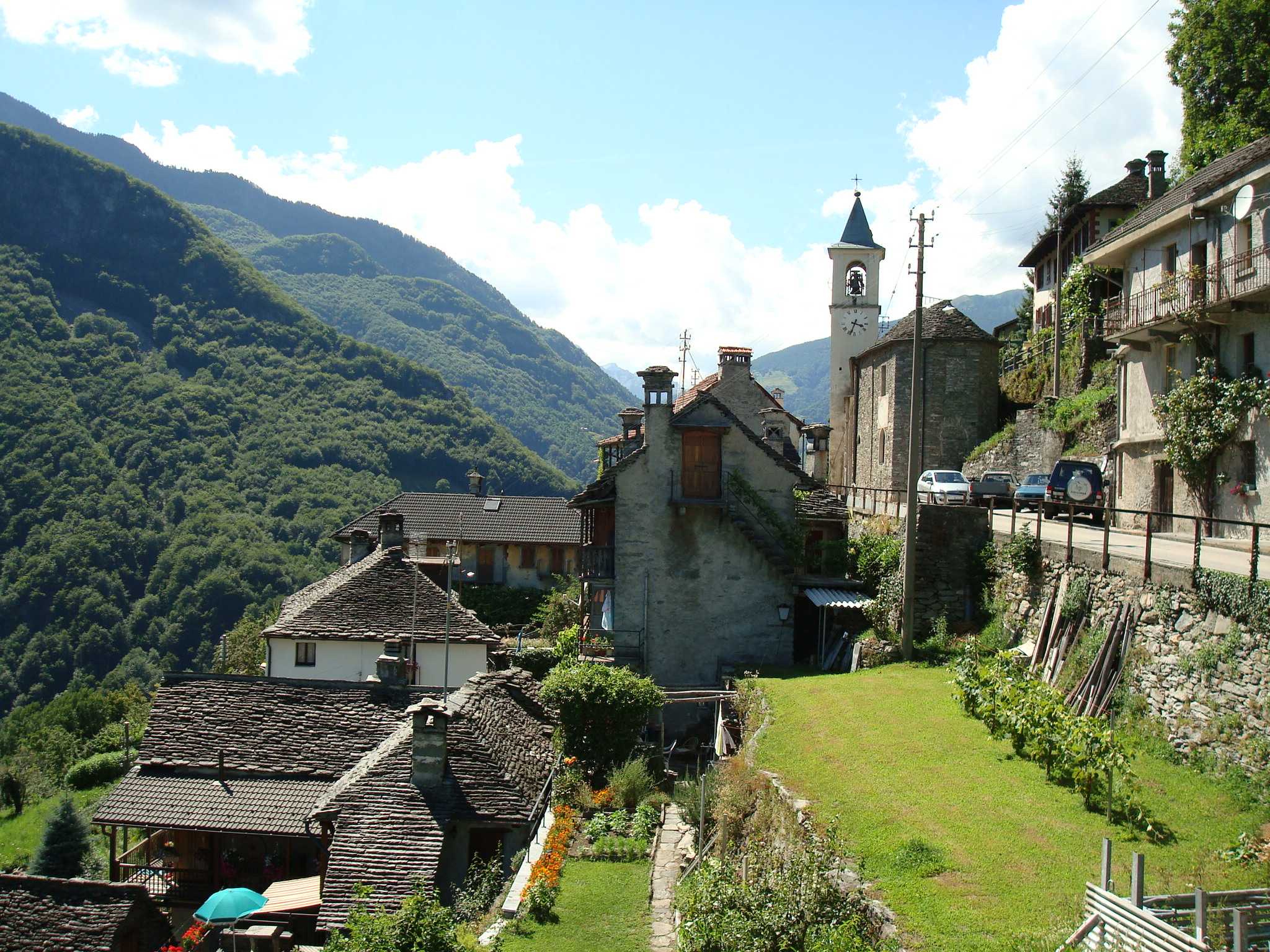
- Mosogno village

- Flag Coat of arms
- Location of Mosogno
- Location within Switzerland Location within Canton of Ticino
- Coordinates: 46°12′N 8°38′E
- Country: Switzerland
- Canton: Ticino
- District: Locarno

Government
  - Mayor: Sindaco

Area
  - Total: 8.61 km^{2} (3.32 sq mi)
- Elevation: 781 m (2,562 ft)

Population (December 2004)
  - Total: 62
  - Density: 7.2/km^{2} (19/sq mi)
- Time zone: UTC+01:00 (CET)
  - Summer (DST): UTC+02:00 (CEST)
- Postal code: 6611
- SFOS number: 5119
- ISO 3166 code: CH-TI
- Surrounded by: Borgnone, Intragna, Isorno, Onsernone
- Website: SFSO statistics

Mosogno is a former municipality in the district of Locarno in the canton of Ticino in Switzerland. On 10 April 2016 the former municipalities of Vergeletto, Gresso, Mosogno and Isorno merged into the municipality of Onsernone.

== History ==
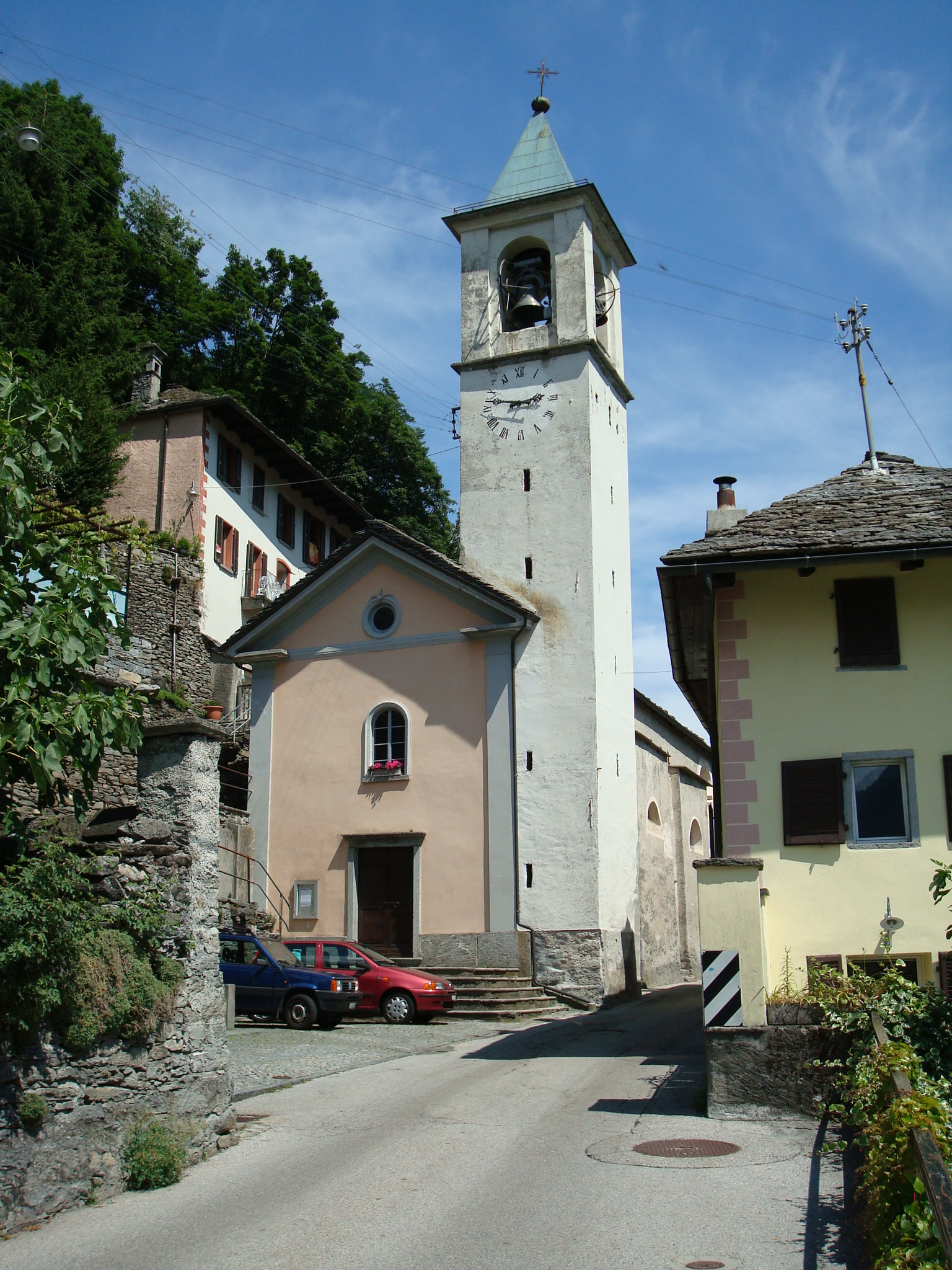
Parish church of S. Bernardo in Mosogno

Mosogno is first mentioned in 1277 as Mosogno. In 1352, it was mentioned as Muxognio. In the Middle Ages, it was one of the five squadrons that made up the community of Onsernone. It became an independent municipality in 1803.

The church of S. Bernardo was built along the road in 1596. It became a parish church and the center of its own parish after it separated from Loco in 1685. The settlement of Mosogno Sotto has had the chapel of St. Maria Addolorata since 1684. In 1657, the chapel of S. Maria della Natività was built in Bairon, while in Chiosso, the chapel of S. Giacomo was built in the second half of the 17th Century.

The decline of the straw factory, emigration, and recent migration to urban centers, have led to a steady decline in population since the late 19th Century.

== Geography ==
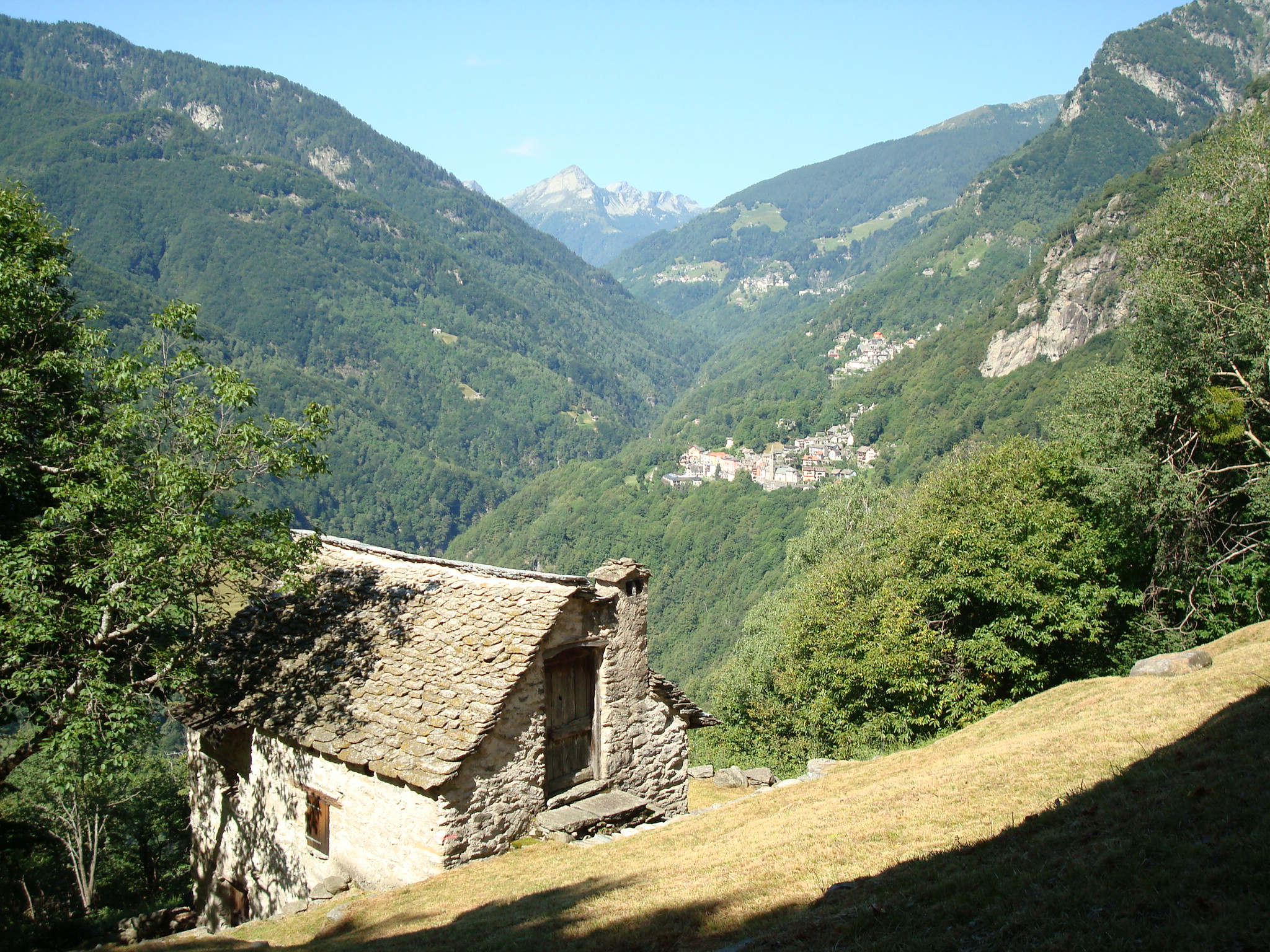
Campeina area with Mosogno

Mosogno had an area, as of 1997, of 8.61 square kilometers (3.32 sq mi). Of this area, 0.08 km^{2} (0.031 sq mi) or 0.9% is used for agricultural purposes, while 7.45 km^{2} (2.88 sq mi) or 86.5% is forested. Of the rest of the land, 0.06 km^{2} (15 acres) or 0.7% is settled (buildings or roads), 0.21 km^{2} (0.081 sq mi) or 2.4% is either rivers or lakes and 0.7 km^{2} (0.27 sq mi) or 8.1% is unproductive land.

Of the built up area, housing and buildings made up 0.5% and transportation infrastructure made up 0.2%. Out of the forested land, 76.2% of the total land area is heavily forested and 3.3% is covered with orchards or small clusters of trees. Of the agricultural land, 0.5% is used for growing crops. All the water in the municipality is flowing water. Of the unproductive areas, 4.2% is unproductive vegetation and 3.9% is too rocky for vegetation.

The former municipality is located in the Locarno district, at an elevation of 783 m (2,569 ft) along the road through the Onsernone valley. It consists of the village of Mosogno and the hamlets of Bairone, Chiosso and Mosogno Sotto.

== Demographics ==
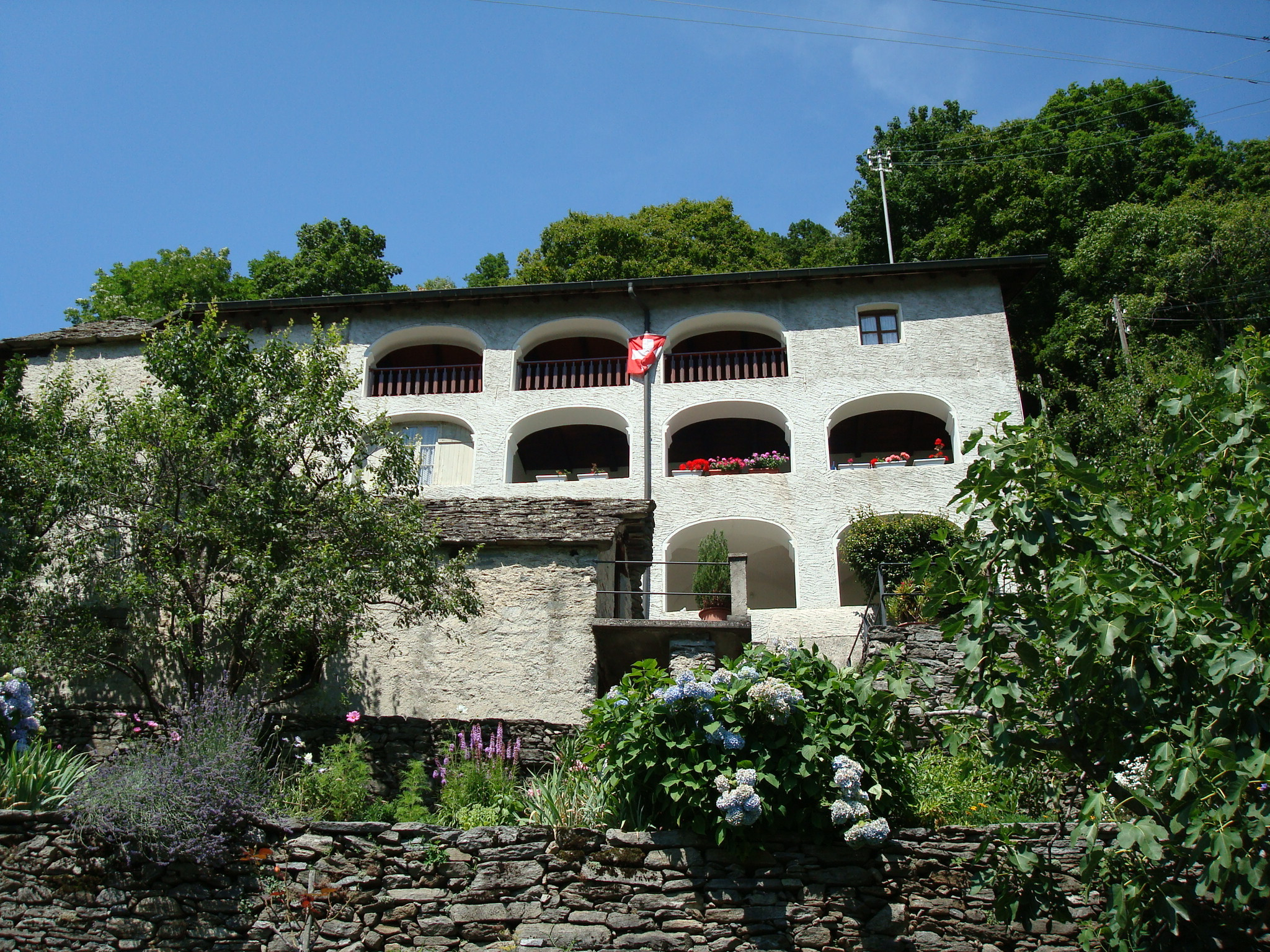
Traditional house in Mosogno

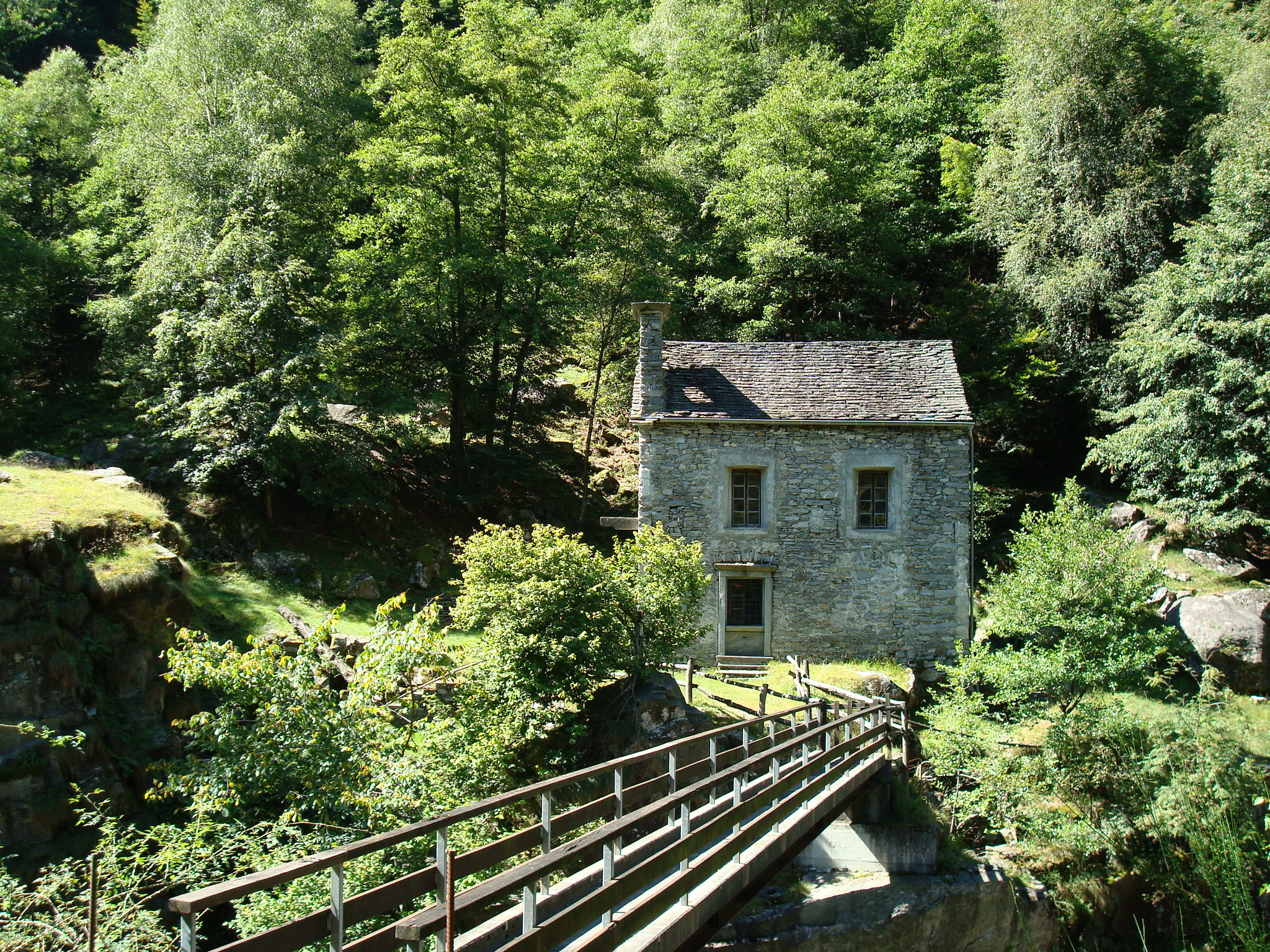
A view of Neveria Chapel

Mosogno had a population (as of 2014) of 51. As of 2008, 8.6% of the population are resident foreign nationals. Over the last 10 years (1997–2007) the population has changed at a rate of -19.2%.

Most of the population (as of 2000) speaks Italian (77.2%), with German being second most common (19.3%) and Spanish being third (3.5%). Of the Swiss national languages (as of 2000), 11 speak German, 44 people speak Italian. The remainder (2 people) speak another language.

As of 2008, the gender distribution of the population was 54.2% male and 45.8% female. The population was made up of 30 Swiss men (50.8% of the population), and 2 (3.4%) non-Swiss men. There were 24 Swiss women (40.7%), and 3 (5.1%) non-Swiss women.

In 2008 there was 1 non-Swiss citizen death. Ignoring immigration and emigration, the population of Swiss citizens remained the same while the foreign population decreased by 1. The total Swiss population change in 2008 (from all sources, including moves across municipal borders) was a decrease of 1. This represents a population growth rate of -1.7%.

The age distribution, as of 2009, in Mosogno is; 6 children or 10.2% of the population are between 0 and 9 years old and 3 teenagers or 5.1% are between 10 and 19. Of the adult population, 3 people or 5.1% of the population are between 20 and 29 years old. 8 people or 13.6% are between 30 and 39, 9 people or 15.3% are between 40 and 49, and 14 people or 23.7% are between 50 and 59. The senior population distribution is 6 people or 10.2% of the population are between 60 and 69 years old, 2 people or 3.4% are between 70 and 79, there are 8 people or 13.6% who are over 80.

As of 2000, there were 26 private households in the municipality, and an average of 2.2 persons per household. In 2000 there were 50 single family homes (or 82.0% of the total) out of a total of 61 inhabited buildings. There were 8 two family buildings (13.1%) and 2 multi-family buildings (3.3%). There was 1 building in the municipality that was a multipurpose buildings (used for both housing and commercial or another purpose).

The vacancy rate for the municipality, in 2008, was 0%. In 2000 there were 74 apartments in the municipality. The most common apartment size was the 3 room apartment of which there were 21. There were 4 single room apartments and 17 apartments with five or more rooms. Of these apartments, a total of 26 apartments (35.1% of the total) were permanently occupied, while 46 apartments (62.2%) were seasonally occupied and 2 apartments (2.7%) were empty. As of 2007, the construction rate of new housing units was 0 new units per 1000 residents.

The historical population is given in the following table:

year	population
1795	290
1808	284
1836	319
1850	307
1870	365
1950	141
1960	73
2000	57

== Sights ==
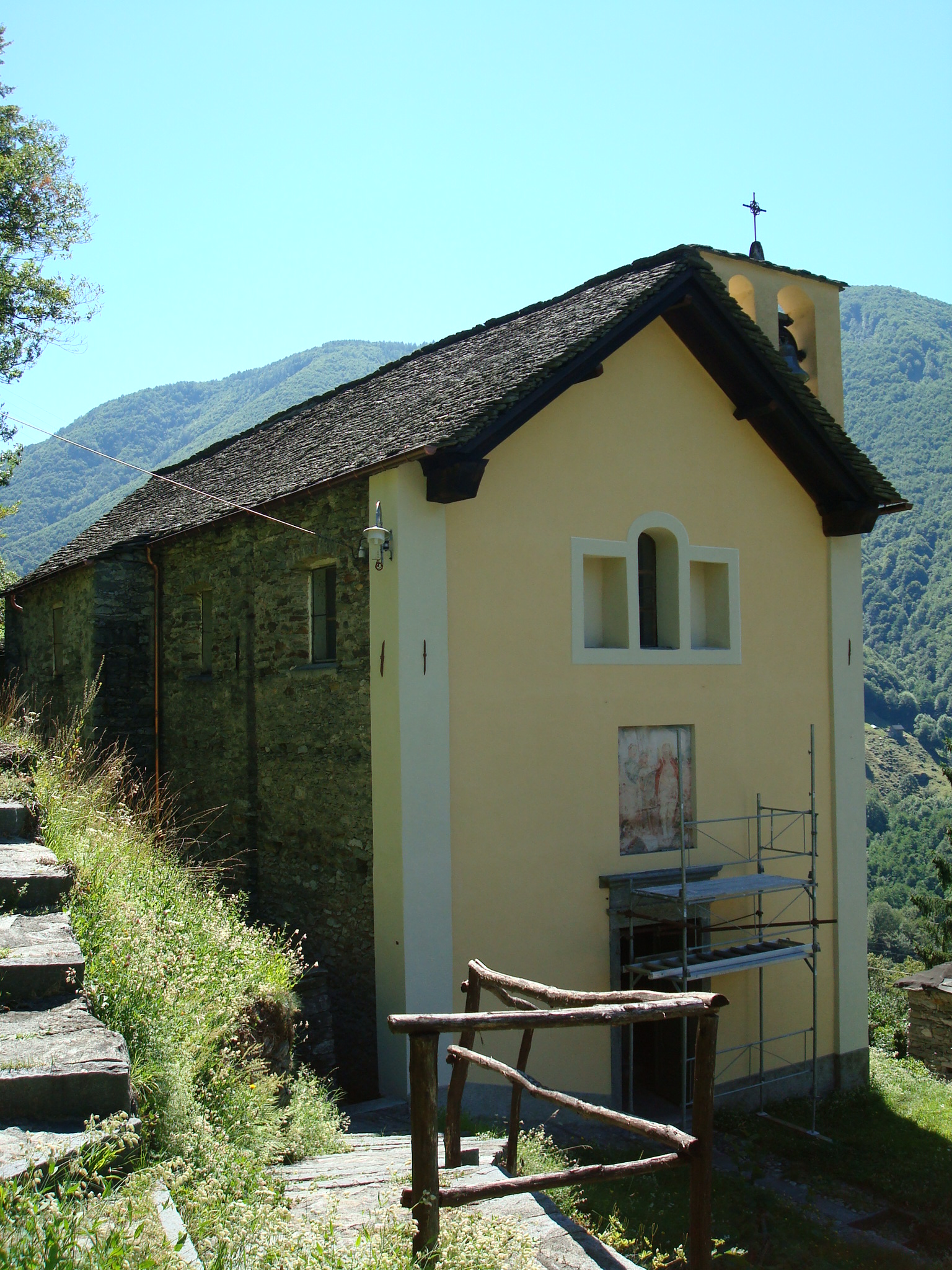
Church in the settlement of Mosogno Sotto

The entire village of Mosogno di sotto is designated as part of the Inventory of Swiss Heritage Sites.

== Politics ==
In the 2007 federal election the most popular party was the SP which received 37.5% of the vote. The next three most popular parties were the FDP (21.67%), the Ticino League (16.67%) and the CVP (13.33%). In the federal election, a total of 15 votes were cast, and the voter turnout was 30.0%.

In the 2007 Gran Consiglio election, there were a total of 51 registered voters in Mosogno, of which 20 or 39.2% voted. The most popular party was the SSI which received 6 or 30.0% of the vote. The next two most popular parties were; the LEGA (with 4 or 20.0%), the PLRT (with 3 or 15.0%).

In the 2007 Consiglio di Stato election, The most popular party was the LEGA which received 5 or 25.0% of the vote. The next three most popular parties were; the LEGA (with 5 or 25.0%), the PLRT (with 3 or 15.0%) and the PLRT (with 3 or 15.0%).

== Economy ==
As of 2007, Mosogno had an unemployment rate of 3.53%. As of 2005, there were 7 people employed in the primary economic sector and about 3 businesses involved in this sector. 3 people were employed in the secondary sector and there were 2 businesses in this sector. 5 people were employed in the tertiary sector, with 2 businesses in this sector. There were 25 residents of the municipality who were employed in some capacity, of which females made up 32.0% of the workforce.

In 2000, there were 9 workers who commuted away from the municipality. Of the working population, 20% used public transportation to get to work, and 36% used a private car.

== Religion ==
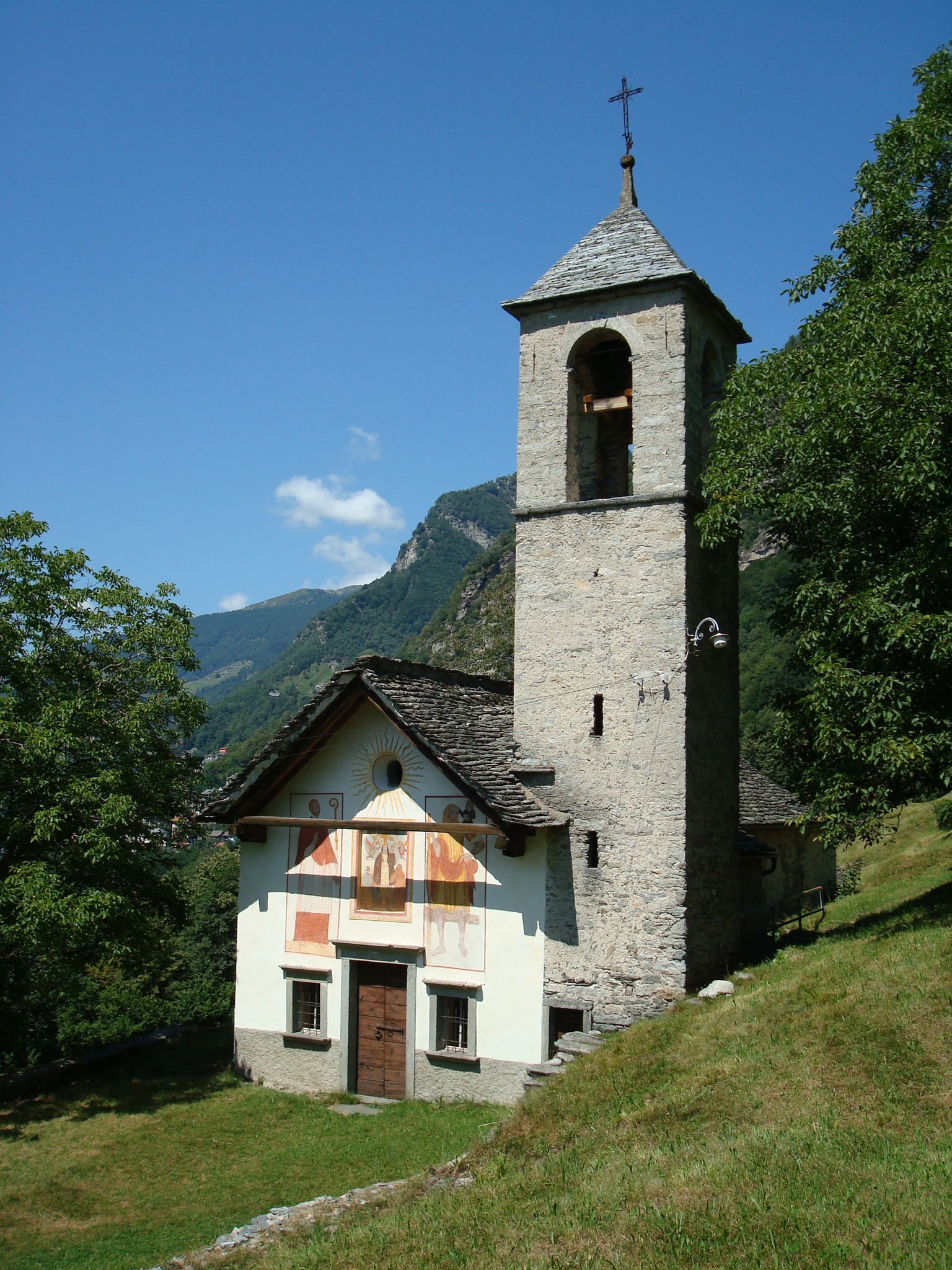
Chapel of S. Maria della Natività in Bairon

From the 2000 census, 43 or 75.4% were Roman Catholic, while 5 or 8.8% belonged to the Swiss Reformed Church. There are 6 individuals (or about 10.53% of the population) who belong to another church (not listed on the census), and 3 individuals (or about 5.26% of the population) did not answer the question.

== Weather ==
Mosogno has an average of 104.8 days of rain or snow per year and on average receives 2,032 mm (80.0 in) of precipitation. The wettest month is September during which time Mosogno receives an average of 244 mm (9.6 in) of rain or snow. During this month there is precipitation for an average of 7.7 days. The month with the most days of precipitation is May, with an average of 13.6, but with only 236 mm (9.3 in) of rain or snow. The driest month of the year is December with an average of 72 mm (2.8 in) of precipitation over 5.6 days.

== Education ==
In Mosogno about 70.3% of the population (between age 25–64) have completed either non-mandatory upper secondary education or additional higher education (either university or a Fachhochschule).

In Mosogno there were a total of 5 students (as of 2009). The Ticino education system provides up to three years of non-mandatory kindergarten and in Mosogno there was 1 child in kindergarten. The primary school program lasts for five years. In the village, 1 student attended the standard primary school. In the lower secondary school system, students either attend a two-year middle school followed by a two-year pre-apprenticeship or they attend a four-year program to prepare for higher education. There were 2 students in the two-year middle school, while 1 students were in the four-year advanced program.

As of 2000, there were 4 students from Mosogno who attended schools outside the municipality.
