= Inventory of Swiss Heritage Sites =

List of sites of cultural and natural significance in Switzerland

The Federal Inventory of Heritage Sites (ISOS) is part of a 1981 Ordinance of the Swiss Federal Council implementing the Federal Law on the Protection of Nature and Cultural Heritage.

== Sites of national importance ==
Site	Canton	Type
Aarau	AG	city
Aarburg	AG	town
Bad Schinznach (Schinznach Bad)	AG	special case
Baden/Ennetbaden	AG	city
Biberstein	AG	special case
Boswil	AG	village
Böttstein	AG	special case
Bremgarten	AG	town
Brugg	AG	city
Elfingen	AG	village
Endingen	AG	special case
Frick	AG	urbanized village
Hasli (Muri)	AG	hamlet
Hellikon	AG	village
Herznach	AG	village
Hettenschwil (Leuggern)	AG	hamlet
Hornussen	AG	village
Husen (Lengnau)	AG	hamlet
Ittenthal	AG	village
Jonen	AG	village
Kaiseraugst	AG	village
Kaiserstuhl	AG	town
Kirchbözberg (Unterbözberg)	AG	special case
Kirchdorf (Obersiggenthal)	AG	village
Klingnau	AG	town
Kloster Fahr (Würenlos)	AG	special case
Königsfelden Abbey (Windisch)	AG	special case
Laufenburg	AG	town
Lengnau	AG	special case
Lenzburg	AG	town
Linn	AG	village
Mandach	AG	village
Meisterschwanden	AG	special case
Mellingen	AG	town
Merenschwand	AG	village
Oberflachs	AG	village
Oberzeihen (Zeihen)	AG	hamlet
Obschlagen/Litzi (Jonen)	AG	hamlet
Oetlikon (Würenlos)	AG	hamlet
Rheinfelden	AG	town
Rupperswil Fabrikanlage (Rupperswil)	AG	special case
Schinznach Dorf	AG	village
Schöftland	AG	urbanized village
Tegerfelden	AG	village
Thalheim	AG	village
Ueberthal (Oberbözberg)	AG	hamlet
Unterendingen	AG	village
Veltheim	AG	village
Villigen	AG	village
Vogelsang (Lengnau)	AG	hamlet
Wallbach	AG	village
Wegenstetten	AG	village
Wettingen Limmatknie (Wettingen)	AG	special case
Wiggwil (Beinwil)	AG	hamlet
Wildegg (Möriken-Wildegg)	AG	special case
Winterschwil (Beinwil)	AG	hamlet
Wittnau	AG	village
Wölflinswil	AG	village
Würenlingen	AG	village
Zofingen	AG	town
Zurzach	AG	town
Appenzell	AI	city
Schlatt	AI	hamlet
Aarberg	BE	town
Schloss Aarwangen/Schürhof (Aarwangen)	BE	special case
Adlemsried (Boltigen)	BE	hamlet
Aeckenmatt (Wahlern)	BE	hamlet
Attiswil	BE	village
Balzenberg (Erlenbach im Simmental)	BE	hamlet
Bangerten	BE	village
Bellelay (Saicourt)	BE	special case
Bern	BE	city
Biel	BE	city
Bigel (Hasle bei Burgdorf)	BE	hamlet
Bipschal (Ligerz)	BE	hamlet
Bleienbach	BE	village
Blumenstein Kirche/Wäsemli/Eschli (Blumenstein)	BE	hamlet
Boltigen	BE	village
Bönigen	BE	village
Breitenegg (Wynigen)	BE	hamlet
Bremgarten bei Bern	BE	special case
Brienz	BE	urbanized village
Brienzwiler	BE	village
Brittenwald (Oberburg)	BE	hamlet
Brünigen (Meiringen)	BE	hamlet
Büelikofen/Graben (Zollikofen)	BE	hamlet
Bümpliz-Bethlehem (Bern)	BE	urbanized village
Büren an der Aare	BE	town
Büren zum Hof	BE	village
Burgdorf	BE	city
Bütikofen (Kirchberg)	BE	hamlet
Champoz	BE	village
Châtelat	BE	village
Chavannes (La Neuveville)	BE	hamlet
Chlyrot (Untersteckholz)	BE	hamlet
Cortébert	BE	village
Crémines	BE	village
Därstetten Kirche/Moos	BE	special case
Deisswil bei Münchenbuchsee	BE	hamlet
Diemtigen	BE	village
Diesse	BE	village
Dürrenroth	BE	village
Elektrizitätswerk Hagneck (Hagneck)	BE	special case
Elektrizitätswerk Kallnach (Kallnach)	BE	special case
Elisried (Wahlern)	BE	hamlet
Epsach	BE	village
Erlach	BE	town
Erlenbach im Simmental	BE	village
Flüelen (Lützelflüh)	BE	hamlet
Gals	BE	village
Gammen (Ferenbalm)	BE	village
Gäserz (Brüttelen)	BE	hamlet
Gerzensee	BE	village
Gimmelwald (Lauterbrunnen)	BE	hamlet
Goldbach (Hasle bei Burgdorf)	BE	village
Gorges de la Suze/Taubenlochschlucht (Péry, Vauffelin, Bienne)	BE	special case
Gottstatt (Orpund)	BE	special case
Grandval	BE	village
Gsteig bei Gstaad	BE	village
Gsteig bei Interlaken (Gsteigwiler/Wilderswil)	BE	village
Guetisberg (Heimiswil)	BE	hamlet
Guggisberg	BE	village
Gurtendörfli (Köniz)	BE	hamlet
Siedlung Halen (Kirchlindach)	BE	special case
Hämlismatt (Arni)	BE	hamlet
Häutligen	BE	village
Herzogenbuchsee	BE	urbanized village
Herzwil (Köniz)	BE	hamlet
Schloss Hindelbank (Hindelbank)	BE	special case
Hofen (Wohlen); see Hofenmühle	BE	hamlet
Hofwil (Münchenbuchsee)	BE	special case
Hotel Giessbach (Brienz)	BE	special case
Huttwil	BE	town
Illiswil (Wohlen)	BE	hamlet
Ins	BE	village
Interlaken (Interlaken/Unterseen)	BE	urbanized village
Iseltwald	BE	village
Jerisberghof (Ferenbalm)	BE	hamlet
Jolimontgut (Gals)	BE	special case
Kanderbrück (Frutigen)	BE	hamlet
Kirchdorf	BE	village
Kleine Scheidegg (Lauterbrunnen)	BE	special case
Kleinhöchstetten (Rubigen)	BE	hamlet
La Neuveville	BE	town
Schloss Landshut (Utzenstorf)	BE	special case
Längenbach (Lauperswil)	BE	hamlet
Langenthal	BE	town
Langnau im Emmental	BE	urbanized village
Laupen	BE	town
Le Cernil/La Chaux-de-Tramelan (Tramelan)	BE	hamlet
Leuzigen	BE	village
Liebewil (Köniz)	BE	hamlet
Ligerz	BE	village
Limpach	BE	village
Lindental (Vechigen)	BE	hamlet
Lützelflüh	BE	village
Lyssach	BE	village
Meienried	BE	special case
Meiniswil (Aarwangen)	BE	hamlet
Meiringen	BE	urbanized village
Mengestorf (Köniz)	BE	hamlet
Moosaffoltern (Rapperswil)	BE	hamlet
Möriswil (Wohlen)	BE	hamlet
Mötschwil	BE	hamlet
Moutier	BE	urbanized village
Kraftwerk Mühleberg (Mühleberg)	BE	special case
Mülchi	BE	village
Münchenwiler	BE	village
Anstalt Münsingen (Münsingen)	BE	special case
Nidau	BE	town
Nidflue (Därstetten)	BE	hamlet
Niederbottigen (Bern)	BE	hamlet
Niederösch	BE	village
Nods	BE	village
Oberbipp	BE	village
Oberbütschel (Rüeggisberg)	BE	hamlet
Oberdettigen (Wohlen)	BE	hamlet
Oberdiessbach	BE	urbanized village
Oberhofen	BE	urbanized village
Oberösch	BE	hamlet
Oberwil bei Büren	BE	village
Oberwil im Simmental	BE	village
Ochlenberg	BE	hamlet
Orvin	BE	village
Pfaffenried (Oberwil im Simmental)	BE	hamlet
Ranflüh (Rüderswil/Lützelflüh)	BE	village
Reconvilier	BE	urbanized village
Renan	BE	village
Ried (Rüderswil)	BE	hamlet
Riedbach (Bern, Frauenkappelen)	BE	hamlet
Riedern (Bern)	BE	hamlet
Riedtwil (Seeberg)	BE	village
Ringgenberg	BE	village
Rohrbach	BE	village
Rohrmoos (Oberburg)	BE	hamlet
Rüderswil	BE	village
Rüeggisberg	BE	village
Rumendingen	BE	village
Rüti bei Büren	BE	village
Rybrügg/Hasli (Frutigen)	BE	special case
Saanen	BE	village
Saint-Imier	BE	urbanized village
Im Sand (Moosseedorf)	BE	special case
Schufelbüel (Lützelflüh)	BE	hamlet
Schwanden (Rüeggisberg)	BE	hamlet
Schwanden (Schüpfen)	BE	village
Schwarzenburg (Wahlern)	BE	town
Seewil (Rapperswil)	BE	village
Signau	BE	village
Siselen	BE	village
Souboz	BE	village
St. Johannsen (Gals)	BE	special case
St. Petersinsel (Twann)	BE	special case
Sumiswald	BE	village
Taubenlochschlucht (Biel u.a.)	BE	special case
Tavannes	BE	urbanized village
Thun	BE	city
Trachselwald (Trachselwald/Lützelflüh)	BE	village
Trub	BE	village
Tüscherz (Tüscherz-Alfermée)	BE	village
Twann	BE	village
Unterseen (Unterseen/Interlaken)	BE	town
Vinelz	BE	village
Vordere Chlapf (Gerzensee)	BE	hamlet
Wäckerschwend (Ochlenberg)	BE	hamlet
Waldau (Bern)	BE	special case
Waldhaus (Lützelflüh)	BE	hamlet
Walperswil	BE	village
Wangen an der Aare	BE	town
Wattenwil (Worb)	BE	hamlet
Weissenburg (Därstetten)	BE	special case
Wiedlisbach	BE	town
Wiggiswil	BE	hamlet
Wilderswil	BE	urbanized village
Wiler (Därstetten)	BE	hamlet
Wiler (Sigriswil)	BE	hamlet
Wileroltigen	BE	village
Willadingen	BE	village
Wimmis	BE	village
Wingreis (Twann)	BE	hamlet
Winterswil (Schüpfen)	BE	hamlet
Witenbach (Lauperswil)	BE	hamlet
Wolei (Frauenkappelen)	BE	hamlet
Worbletal (Bolligen, Ittigen, Ostermundigen, Stettlen)	BE	special case
Zimlisberg (Rapperswil)	BE	hamlet
Allschwil	BL	village
Angenstein (Duggingen)	BL	special case
Anwil	BL	village
Arisdorf	BL	village
Arlesheim	BL	village
Augst mit Augusta Raurica	BL	special case
Bennwil	BL	village
Brüglingen (Münchenstein)	BL	special case
Burg im Leimental	BL	village
Buus	BL	village
Freidorf (Muttenz)	BL	special case
Gelterkinden	BL	urbanized village
Itingen	BL	village
Kilchberg	BL	village
Laufen	BL	town
Lausen	BL	special case
Liesbergmüli	BL	special case
Liestal	BL	town
Maisprach	BL	village
Muttenz	BL	village
Oltingen	BL	village
Pratteln	BL	urbanized village
Rothenfluh	BL	village
Rümlingen	BL	village
Schöntal (Langenbruck)	BL	special case
Sissach	BL	urbanized village
Waldenburg	BL	town
Wenslingen	BL	village
Wintersingen	BL	village
Ziefen	BL	village
Zwingen	BL	urbanized village
Basel	BS	city
Riehen	BS	urbanized village
St. Chrischona (Bettingen)	BS	special case
Barberêche/Petit et Grand Vivy (Barberêche)	FR	special case
Bösingen	FR	village
Bourguillon (Fribourg)	FR	special case
Broc-Fabrique (Broc)	FR	special case
Broc-Vieille Cure (Broc)	FR	special case
Bulle	FR	town
Bussy	FR	village
Châtel-Saint-Denis	FR	town
Chavannes-les-Forts (Siviriez)	FR	village
Corbières	FR	special case
Cressier	FR	village
Dompierre	FR	village
Estavannens	FR	village
Estavayer-le-Lac	FR	town
Font	FR	special case
Fribourg	FR	city
Galmis (Düdingen)	FR	hamlet
Grandvillard	FR	village
Granges-sur-Marly (Pierrafortscha)	FR	hamlet
Gruyères	FR	town
Hauterive (Posieux)	FR	special case
Jaun	FR	village
Jetschwil (Düdingen)	FR	hamlet
Kerzers	FR	urbanized village
Lessoc	FR	village
Lurtigen	FR	village
Mézières	FR	village
Montagny-les-Monts	FR	special case
Montbovon	FR	special case
Môtier (Haut-Vully)	FR	village
Muntelier	FR	village
Murten	FR	town
Neirivue (Haut-Intyamon)	FR	village
Orsonnens	FR	village
La Part Dieu (Gruyères)	FR	special case
Plaffeien	FR	village
Prayoud (Châtel-Saint-Denis)	FR	hamlet
Praz (Bas-Vully)	FR	village
Promasens	FR	village
Richterwil (Bösingen)	FR	hamlet
La Riedera (Essert, Montévraz)	FR	special case
Romont	FR	town
Rue	FR	town
Rueyres-Treyfayes	FR	hamlet
Salvenach	FR	village
Sensebrücke (Wünnewil-Flamatt)	FR	special case
Torny-le-Petit (Middes)	FR	hamlet
Vallon du Gottéron (Fribourg)	FR	special case
La Valsainte (Cerniat)	FR	special case
Villarsel-sur-Marly	FR	hamlet
Villars-sous-Mont	FR	village
Villars-sur-Marly (Pierrafortscha)	FR	hamlet
Villarvolard	FR	village
Vuippens	FR	special case
Vuissens	FR	village
Avully	GE	village
Bourdigny	GE	village
Carouge	GE	city
Carre	GE	hamlet
Cartigny	GE	village
Céligny	GE	village
Choully	GE	village
Compesières	GE	special case
Dardagny	GE	village
Genève	GE	city
Genthod	GE	village
Hermance	GE	town
Jussy	GE	village
Landecy	GE	village
Malval	GE	hamlet
Onex	GE	village
Peissy	GE	village
Satigny-Dessus	GE	special case
Sézegnin	GE	village
Sierne	GE	hamlet
Sionnet	GE	hamlet
Soral	GE	village
Veyrier	GE	urbanized village
Adlenbach (Luchsingen)	GL	hamlet
Diesbach	GL	village
Elm	GL	village
Ennenda	GL	urbanized village
Glarus	GL	city
Mollis	GL	village
Näfels	GL	urbanized village
Rüti	GL	village
Steinibach (Elm)	GL	hamlet
Ziegelbrücke (Niederurnen)	GL	special case
Almens	GR	village
Alvaneu	GR	village
Alvaschein	GR	village
Andeer	GR	village
Ardez	GR	village
Augio (Rossa)	GR	village
Averser Hofweiler (Avers)	GR	special case
Bergün/Bravuogn	GR	village
Bever	GR	village
Bodio/Cauco (Cauco)	GR	village
Bondo	GR	village
Borgonovo (Stampa)	GR	village
Bos-cha (Ardez)	GR	hamlet
Braggio: Aira/Mezzana/Miaddi/Oer/Refontana/ Stabbio	GR	village
Brienz	GR	village
Brün (Valendas)	GR	hamlet
Calfreisen	GR	village
Campi (Sils im Domleschg)	GR	special case
Cantone (Poschiavo)	GR	hamlet
Castasegna	GR	village
Castrisch	GR	village
Cavaione (Brusio)	GR	hamlet
Cavardiras (Disentis)	GR	hamlet
Chur	GR	city
Coltura (Stampa)	GR	village
Curaglia (Medel)	GR	village
Disla (Disentis)	GR	hamlet
Duvin	GR	village
Eidgenössische Pulvermühle (Chur)	GR	special case
Felsberg	GR	village
Fideris	GR	village
Filisur	GR	village
Fläsch	GR	village
Flims-Waldhaus	GR	special case
Fürstenau	GR	town
Grono con Pont del Ram e San Clemente	GR	village
Grüsch/Schmitten (Grüsch/Seewis)	GR	village
Guarda	GR	village
Haldenstein	GR	village
Igels/Degen	GR	village
Ilanz	GR	town
Jenins	GR	village
Küblis	GR	special case
La Punt (La Punt Chamues-ch)	GR	village
Landarenca (Arvigo)	GR	hamlet
Latsch (Bergün)	GR	hamlet
Lavin	GR	village
Lohn	GR	village
Lumbrein	GR	village
Luven	GR	village
Luzein	GR	village
Maienfeld	GR	town
Malans	GR	village
Medergen (Langwies)	GR	hamlet
Mesocco	GR	village
Monstein (Davos)	GR	village
Müstair	GR	urbanized village
Obermutten (Mutten)	GR	hamlet
Paspels	GR	special case
Pignia	GR	village
Poschiavo	GR	town
Prada (Poschiavo)	GR	village
Präz	GR	village
Promontogno (Bondo)	GR	village
Puntraschigna	GR	urbanized village
Putz (Luzein)	GR	hamlet
Reichenau (Tamins)	GR	special case
Reischen (Zillis-Reischen)	GR	hamlet
Riom (Riom-Parsonz)	GR	village
Rossa	GR	village
Roveredo con Ai Rogg, Beffeno, Carasole, Guerra, Mot, Rugno, S. Fedele e S. Giulio	GR	urbanized village
Sagogn	GR	village
Salouf	GR	village
Samedan	GR	urbanized village
San Carlo (Poschiavo)	GR	village
San Vittore	GR	village
Santa Maria	GR	village
Santa Maria in Calanca	GR	village
Sapün (Langwies)	GR	hamlet
Sarn	GR	village
S-chanf	GR	village
Scharans	GR	village
Schlans	GR	village
Scuol	GR	urbanized village
Seewis im Prättigau	GR	village
Segnes (Disentis)	GR	village
Sent	GR	village
Sils im Domleschg	GR	special case
Soazza	GR	village
Soglio	GR	village
Somvix	GR	village
Splügen	GR	village
St. Luzisteig (Maienfeld/Fläsch)	GR	special case
Stampa	GR	village
Stierva	GR	village
Strassberg (Langwies)	GR	hamlet
Stugl (Bergün)	GR	hamlet
Sur En (Ardez)	GR	hamlet
Tamins	GR	village
Tarasp	GR	special case
Tersnaus	GR	village
Trun	GR	urbanized village
Tschlin	GR	village
Tumegl/Tomils-Ortenstein	GR	special case
Valendas	GR	village
Vicosoprano	GR	village
Villa	GR	village
Vnà (Ramosch)	GR	village
Vrin	GR	village
Vulpera (Tarasp)	GR	special case
Waltensburg	GR	village
Zernez	GR	urbanized village
Zillis (Zillis-Reischen)	GR	village
Zuoz	GR	village
Alle	JU	urbanized village
Bourrignon	JU	village
Chevenez	JU	village
Choindez (Courrendlin)	JU	special case
Coeuve	JU	village
Corban	JU	village
Courcelon (Courroux)	JU	hamlet
Delémont	JU	town
Fahy	JU	village
Grandgourt (Montignez)	JU	special case
La Bosse (Le Bémont)	JU	hamlet
La Chaux-des-Breuleux	JU	hamlet
La Maira (Buix)	JU	hamlet
Le Noirmont	JU	urbanized village
Les Cerlatez (Saignelégier)	JU	hamlet
Les Forges (Undervelier)	JU	special case
Les Pommerats	JU	village
Löwenburg (Pleigne)	JU	special case
Miécourt	JU	village
Montenol	JU	hamlet
Montignez	JU	village
Muriaux	JU	village
Pleujouse	JU	special case
Porrentruy	JU	town
Rocourt	JU	village
Saint-Ursanne	JU	town
Soulce	JU	village
Altishofen	LU	village
Beromünster	LU	town
Blatten (Malters)	LU	hamlet
Buttisholz	LU	village
Dierikon	LU	hamlet
Dottenberg (Adligenswil)	LU	hamlet
Ermensee	LU	village
Escholzmatt	LU	village
Geiss (Menznau)	LU	hamlet
Greppen	LU	village
Schloss Heidegg (Gelfingen)	LU	special case
Heiligkreuz (Hasle)	LU	special case
Hergiswald (Kriens)	LU	special case
Hitzkirch	LU	village
Hohenrain	LU	special case
Kulturlandschaft Kastelen (Alberswil, Ettiswil, Gettnau, Schötz)	LU	special case
Kirchbühl (Sempach)	LU	hamlet
Krummbach (Geuensee)	LU	hamlet
Luthern	LU	village
Luzern	LU	city
Marbach	LU	village
Mauensee	LU	special case
Villenlandschaft Meggen (Meggen)	LU	special case
Perlen (Buchrain/Root)	LU	special case
Richensee (Hitzkirch)	LU	special case
Ruswil	LU	village
Sankt Urban (Pfaffnau)	LU	special case
Seewagen (Kottwil)	LU	hamlet
Sempach	LU	town
Sursee	LU	town
Werthenstein	LU	special case
Willisau (Willisau Stadt)	LU	town
Auvernier	NE	village
Boudry	NE	town
Bussy/Le Sorgereux (valangin)	NE	special case
Buttes	NE	village
Cernier	NE	urbanized village
Cité Martini (Marin-Epagnier)	NE	special case
Cité Suchard (Neuchâtel)	NE	special case
Colombier	NE	urbanized village
Cortaillod	NE	village
Couvet	NE	urbanized village
Cressier	NE	village
Dombresson	NE	village
Fleurier	NE	urbanized village
Grandchamp (Boudry)	NE	special case
La Borcarderie (Valangin)	NE	special case
La Chaux-de-Fonds	NE	city
Le Landeron	NE	town
Le Locle	NE	city
Les Brenets	NE	urbanized village
Môtiers	NE	village
Neuchâtel	NE	city
Saint-Blaise	NE	village
Travers	NE	urbanized village
Valangin	NE	town
Vaumarcus	NE	special case
Beckenried	NW	urbanized village
Buochs	NW	urbanized village
Bürgenstock (Stansstad)	NW	special case
Chappelendorf (Dallenwil)	NW	hamlet
Kehrsiten (Stansstad)	NW	hamlet
Ridli (Beckenried)	NW	hamlet
Stans	NW	town
Flüeli-Ranft	OW	special case
Kirchhofen (Sarnen)	OW	special case
Lungern	OW	urbanized village
Obsee (Lungern)	OW	hamlet
Ramersberg	OW	hamlet
Rudenz	OW	special case
Sachseln	OW	urbanized village
Sarnen	OW	city
Bibermühle (Ramsen)	SH	special case
Dörflingen	SH	village
Gächlingen	SH	village
Hallau	SH	village
Lohn	SH	village
Löhningen	SH	village
Merishausen	SH	village
Neunkirch	SH	town
Oberhallau	SH	village
Osterfingen	SH	village
Ramsen	SH	village
Rüdlingen	SH	village
Schaffhausen	SH	city
Schleitheim	SH	village
Stein am Rhein	SH	town
Thayngen	SH	urbanized village
Wilchingen	SH	village
Aetingen	SO	village
Balm bei Messen	SO	village
Balsthal	SO	town
Büren	SO	village
Einsiedelei (Rüttenen)	SO	special case
Goetheanum (Dornach)	SO	special case
Gossliwil	SO	village
Grenchen	SO	urbanized village
Hessigkofen	SO	village
Hochwald	SO	village
Höngen (Laupersdorf)	SO	hamlet
Innere Klus (Balsthal)	SO	special case
Kloster Beinwil	SO	special case
Kreuzen (Rüttenen)	SO	special case
Lüsslingen	SO	village
Mariastein (Metzerlen)	SO	special case
Meltingen	SO	village
Messen	SO	village
Metzerlen	SO	village
Mühledorf	SO	village
Nennigkofen	SO	village
Neuendorf	SO	village
Niederbuchsiten	SO	village
Niedererlinsbach	SO	village
Nuglar (Nuglar-St. Pantaleon)	SO	village
Oberbuchsiten	SO	village
Oberdorf	SO	village
Olten	SO	town
Rodersdorf	SO	village
Schloss Waldegg/Feldbrunnen/St. Niklaus	SO	special case
Schnottwil	SO	village
Schönenwerd-Niedergösgen	SO	urbanized village
Seewen	SO	village
Solothurn	SO	city
St. Pantaleon (Nuglar-St. Pantaleon)	SO	village
St. Wolfgang	SO	special case
Tscheppach	SO	village
Arth	SZ	village
Biberegg	SZ	special case
Brunnen (Ingenbohl)	SZ	urbanized village
Ecce Homo (Sattel)	SZ	hamlet
Einsiedeln	SZ	town
Etzelpass/St. Meinrad (Einsiedeln)	SZ	special case
Gersau	SZ	village
Grinau (Tuggen)	SZ	special case
Küssnacht am Rigi	SZ	town
Lachen	SZ	town
Merlischachen	SZ	hamlet
Muotathal	SZ	village
Pfäffikon-Unterdorf	SZ	special case
Schwyz	SZ	city
Seestatt	SZ	hamlet
Siebnen (Schübelbach)	SZ	village
Steinen	SZ	village
Ufenau (Freienbach)	SZ	special case
Altenchlingen (Engwang)	TG	special case
Altnau	TG	village
Alt-Paradies (Unterschlatt)	TG	special case
Anwil (Fischingen)	TG	hamlet
Arbon	TG	town
Aumühle (Frauenfeld)	TG	special case
Balgen (Egnach)	TG	hamlet
Berlingen	TG	village
Birmoos (Egnach)	TG	hamlet
Bischofszell	TG	town
Blidegg-Degenau (Sitterdorf)	TG	special case
Boltshausen (Märstetten)	TG	hamlet
Bommen (Alterswilen)	TG	hamlet
Bürglen	TG	town
Chratzeren (Frasnacht)	TG	hamlet
Dickihof (Unterschlatt)	TG	hamlet
Diessenhofen	TG	town
Engwang	TG	hamlet
Erlen-Eppishusen	TG	urbanized village
Ermatingen	TG	town
Eschenzer Becken	TG	special case
Farhof (Oberneunforn)	TG	hamlet
Fischingen	TG	special case
Frauenfeld	TG	city
Glarisegg (Steckborn)	TG	special case
Gottlieben	TG	town
Griesenberg	TG	special case
Grüneck (Müllheim)	TG	special case
Gündelhart (Gündelhart/Hörhausen)	TG	hamlet
Hagenwil (Räuchlisberg)	TG	village
Hard (Mauren)	TG	hamlet
Hauptwil	TG	village
Heiligkreuz (Wuppenau)	TG	hamlet
Hessenreuti	TG	hamlet
Hüttlingen	TG	village
Karthause Ittingen (Warth)	TG	special case
Kehlhof (Berg)	TG	hamlet
Kesswil	TG	village
Kreuzlingen	TG	urbanized village
Lustdorf	TG	village
Lütmerken (Griesenberg)	TG	hamlet
Mammern	TG	special case
Märstetten	TG	village
Münsterlingen (Scherzingen/Landschlacht)	TG	special case
Närgeten (Weiningen)	TG	hamlet
Niederneunforn	TG	village
Nussbaumen	TG	village
Oberneunforn	TG	village
Oberwangen (Fischingen)	TG	hamlet
Oettlishusen (Hohentannen)	TG	special case
Ottenberg Südhang	TG	special case
Ottoberg (Märstetten)	TG	village
Rheinklingen	TG	village
Roggwil	TG	village
Romanshorn	TG	urbanized village
Salenstein	TG	village
Schlossbereich Untersee Ost (Tägerwilen, Salenstein)	TG	special case
Schlossbereich Untersee West (Lanzenneunforn, Mammern)	TG	special case
Schönholzerswilen	TG	village
Sommeri	TG	village
St. Katharinental (Willisdorf)	TG	special case
Steckborn	TG	town
Steinebrunn (Egnach)	TG	village
Stettfurt	TG	village
Tobel	TG	special case
Triboltingen	TG	village
Trüttlikon (Buch)	TG	hamlet
Watt (Roggwil)	TG	hamlet
Weinfelden	TG	town
Wertbüel (Reuti)	TG	hamlet
Zezikon	TG	hamlet
Zihlschlacht	TG	village
Airolo	TI	town
Altanca (Quinto)	TI	village
Anzonico	TI	village
Aranno	TI	village
Arogno	TI	village
Arzo	TI	village
Ascona	TI	town
Astano	TI	village
Auressio	TI	village
Aurigeno	TI	village
Avegno chiesa e di dentro (Avegno)	TI	village
Avegno di fuori (Avegno)	TI	village
Barbengo	TI	village
Bedigliora	TI	village
Bedretto	TI	village
Bellinzona	TI	city
Berzona	TI	village
Biasca	TI	town
Bidogno	TI	village
Bignasco	TI	village
Biogno (Breganzona)	TI	hamlet
Bissone	TI	village
Bordei (Palagnedra)	TI	hamlet
Borgnone	TI	village
Boschetto (Cevio)	TI	village
Bosco/Gurin	TI	village
Brè (Lugano)	TI	village
Breno	TI	village
Brione Verzasca	TI	village
Isole di Brissago (Brissago)	TI	special case
Broglio	TI	village
Brontallo	TI	village
Brusata (Novazzano)	TI	hamlet
Brusgnano-Freggio (Osco)	TI	village
Brusino Arsizio	TI	village
Cabbio	TI	village
Calonico	TI	village
Calpiogna	TI	village
Campo Vallemaggia	TI	village
Campora (Caneggio)	TI	hamlet
Carona	TI	village
Casima	TI	village
Caslano	TI	village
Castagnola (Lugano)	TI	special case
Castel San Pietro	TI	village
Castelrotto (Croglio)	TI	village
Cevio/Rovana (Cevio)	TI	village
Chiasso	TI	special case
Chironico	TI	village
Cimadera	TI	village
Cimalmotto (Campo Vallemaggia)	TI	village
Ciona (Carona)	TI	hamlet
Comologno	TI	village
Corino (Cerentino)	TI	hamlet
Corippo	TI	village
Cortignelli (Peccia)	TI	hamlet
Costa (Borgnone)	TI	village
Curio	TI	village
Dangio (Aquila)	TI	village
Dongio	TI	village
Faido	TI	urbanized village
Figgione (Rossura)	TI	hamlet
Fontana (Airolo)	TI	village
Fusio	TI	village
Gandria	TI	village
Cantine di Gandria (Gandria)	TI	special case
Giornico	TI	village
Golino (Centovalli)	TI	village
Gresso	TI	village
Indemini	TI	village
Intragna	TI	village
Iseo	TI	village
Largario	TI	hamlet
Lavertezzo	TI	village
Ligornetto	TI	village
Linescio	TI	village
Lionza (Borgnone)	TI	village
Locarno	TI	city
Loco	TI	village
Lugano	TI	city
Magadino-Rivabella (Magadino)	TI	village
Melano	TI	village
Mendrisio	TI	town
Meride	TI	village
Moghegno	TI	village
Moleno	TI	village
Monte	TI	village
Morcote	TI	village
Mosogno di sotto (Mosogno)	TI	hamlet
Muggio	TI	village
Muzzano	TI	village
Navone (Semione)	TI	hamlet
Olivone/Solario (Olivone)	TI	village
Origlio	TI	village
Orino/Ronge (Malvaglia)	TI	village
Osco	TI	village
Osignano (Sigirino)	TI	hamlet
Palagnedra	TI	village
Piotta (Quinto)	TI	village
Pontirone (Biasca)	TI	village
Ponto Valentino	TI	village
Prato (Prato-Sornico)	TI	village
Preonzo	TI	village
Primadengo (Calpiogna)	TI	hamlet
Quinto	TI	village
Rancate	TI	village
Rasa (Intragna)	TI	village
Riva San Vitale	TI	town
Ronco (Quinto)	TI	village
Rossura	TI	village
Rovio	TI	village
Russo	TI	village
Sala-Capriasca	TI	village
San Bartolomeo (Vogorno)	TI	hamlet
Ospizio del San Gottardo (Airolo)	TI	special case
Chiesa di Sant' Abbondio (Gentilino)	TI	special case
Chiesa di Santa Maria d' Iseo (Vernate)	TI	special case
Convento di Santa Maria del Bigorio (Sala-Capriasca)	TI	special case
Monastero di Santa Maria (Claro)	TI	special case
Scudellate (Muggio)	TI	village
Semione	TI	village
Sessa	TI	village
Sobrio-Ronzano (Sobrio)	TI	village
Someo	TI	village
Sonogno	TI	village
Sonvico	TI	village
Sornico (Prato-Sornico)	TI	village
Stabio	TI	town
Tengia (Rossura)	TI	village
Torello (Carona)	TI	special case
Val Bavona (Bignasco/Cavergno)	TI	special case
Val Malvaglia (Malvaglia)	TI	special case
Verdasio (Intragna)	TI	village
Verscio	TI	village
Villa (Bedretto)	TI	village
Villa (Coldrerio)	TI	village
Altdorf	UR	city
Amsteg (Silenen)	UR	special case
Andermatt	UR	village
Bauen	UR	village
Bürglen	UR	village
Dörfli (Silenen)	UR	hamlet
Erstfeld	UR	urbanized village
Flüelen	UR	urbanized village
Göschenen	UR	urbanized village
Gurtnellen-Wyler (Gurtnellen)	UR	special case
Hospenthal	UR	village
Maderanertal Berghotel (Silenen)	UR	special case
Aigle	VD	town
Aran (Villette)	VD	village
Aubonne	VD	town
Avenches	VD	town
Begnins	VD	village
Bougy-Villars	VD	village
Bugnaux (Essertines-sur-Rolle)	VD	hamlet
Bursins	VD	village
Burtigny	VD	village
Caux (Montreux)	VD	special case
Château de Chillon (Veytaux)	VD	special case
Châtelard (Lutry)	VD	hamlet
La Chaux (Cossonay)	VD	village
Chavannes-sur-Moudon	VD	village
Chez-les-Aubert (Le Chenit)	VD	hamlet
Colombier	VD	village
Combremont-le-Petit	VD	village
Coppet	VD	town
Cossonay	VD	town
Cotterd (Bellerive)	VD	hamlet
Cuarnens	VD	village
Cully	VD	town
Denezy	VD	village
Eclépens	VD	village
Epesses	VD	village
Etoy	VD	village
Féchy	VD	village
Ferreyres	VD	village
Flendruz (Rougemont)	VD	hamlet
Gimel	VD	village
Givrins	VD	village
Grandcour	VD	village
Grandvaux	VD	village
Granges-près-Marnand	VD	urbanized village
Gryon	VD	urbanized village
Haras fédéral (Avenches)	VD	special case
Huémoz (Ollon)	VD	village
Jouxtens-Mézery	VD	special case
L'Etivaz (Château-d'Œx)	VD	hamlet
L'Isle	VD	special case
La Forclaz (Ormont-Dessous)	VD	village
La Ville (Ormont-Dessus)	VD	hamlet
Lausanne	VD	city
Lavigny	VD	village
Le Bévieux (Bex)	VD	special case
Le Lieu	VD	village
Le Pont (L'Abbaye)	VD	village
Le Séchey (Le Lieu)	VD	village
Le Sentier (Le Chenit)	VD	urbanized village
Le Solliat (Le Chenit)	VD	village
Les Posses (Bex)	VD	village
Leysin	VD	urbanized village
Lonay	VD	village
Lovatens	VD	village
Lucens	VD	town
Luins	VD	hamlet
Lutry	VD	town
Marchissy	VD	village
Mex	VD	village
Mollens	VD	village
Montet (Cudrefin)	VD	village
Montreux	VD	special case
Mont-sur-Rolle	VD	village
Morges	VD	town
Moudon	VD	town
Noville	VD	village
Nyon	VD	city
Ogens	VD	village
Ollon	VD	village
Orny	VD	village
Oron-le-Châtel	VD	special case
Pampigny	VD	village
Payerne	VD	town
Perroy	VD	village
Poudrerie fédérale (Aubonne)	VD	special case
Prangins	VD	village
Pully	VD	urbanized village
Riex	VD	village
Rivaz	VD	village
Rolle	VD	town
Rossinière	VD	village
Rougemont	VD	village
Saint-Livres	VD	village
Saint-Prex	VD	town
Saint-Saphorin	VD	village
Saint-Saphorin-sur-Morges	VD	village
La Sarraz	VD	town
Sassel	VD	village
Savuit (Lutry)	VD	hamlet
Tartegnin	VD	hamlet
Taveyanne (Gryon)	VD	special case
Territet/Veytaux (Montreux et Veytaux)	VD	urbanized village
Trey	VD	village
Treytorrens	VD	village
Treytorrens (Puidoux)	VD	hamlet
Vallamand-Dessous (Bellerive)	VD	hamlet
Vernand-Dessus (Lausanne)	VD	special case
Vers-l'Eglise (Ormont-Dessus)	VD	village
Vevey	VD	city
Veyges (Leysin)	VD	hamlet
Villarzel	VD	village
Villas Dubochet (Montreux)	VD	special case
Villeneuve	VD	town
Vinzel	VD	hamlet
Vufflens-la-Ville	VD	village
Vufflens-le-Château	VD	special case
Vullierens	VD	village
Yens	VD	village
Yvorne/Vers Morey	VD	village
Albinen	VS	village
Ammere/Gadme/Wiler (Blitzingen)	VS	hamlet
Ayer	VS	village
Barmüli (Visperterminen)	VS	hamlet
Bidermatten (Saas Balen)	VS	hamlet
Biel	VS	village
Bitzinen (Visperterminen)	VS	hamlet
Blatten	VS	village
Blatten (Naters)	VS	village
Bodma (Bellwald)	VS	hamlet
Bodmen (Blitzingen)	VS	hamlet
Bodmen (Mund)	VS	hamlet
Bourg-Saint-Pierre	VS	village
Bramois (Sion)	VS	village
Branson (Fully)	VS	hamlet
Brig	VS	city
Bruson (Bagnes)	VS	village
Burge (Törbel)	VS	hamlet
Le Châble (Bagnes)	VS	village
Commeire (Orsières)	VS	hamlet
Conthey-Bourg/St-Séverin (Conthey)	VS	special case
Eggen (Betten)	VS	hamlet
Eggen (Simplon)	VS	hamlet
Eischoll	VS	village
Eisten	VS	village
Eisten (Blatten)	VS	hamlet
Ernen	VS	village
Erschmatt	VS	village
Evionnaz	VS	village
Evolène	VS	village
Fäld (Binn)	VS	hamlet
Feld (Törbel)	VS	hamlet
Feschel	VS	village
Finhaut	VS	special case
Fontenelle (Bagnes)	VS	hamlet
Geschinen	VS	village
Gletsch (Oberwald)	VS	special case
Gluringen	VS	village
Goppisberg	VS	village
Grand St-Bernard (Bourg-St-Pierre)	VS	special case
Greich	VS	village
Grengiols	VS	village
Grimentz	VS	village
Les Haudères (Evolène)	VS	village
Hérémence	VS	village
Isérables	VS	village
Kippel	VS	village
Lana (Evolène)	VS	hamlet
Lens	VS	village
Leuk	VS	town
Liddes	VS	village
Mâche/Mâchette (Hérémence)	VS	hamlet
Martigny-Bourg (Martigny)	VS	town
Martigny-Ville (Martigny)	VS	city
Mase	VS	village
Médières (Bagnes)	VS	village
Miéville (Vernayaz)	VS	hamlet
Mühlebach	VS	village
Münster	VS	village
Naters	VS	urbanized village
Neubrück (Stalden)	VS	special case
Niedergesteln	VS	village
Niederhäusern (Visperterminen)	VS	hamlet
Niederwald	VS	village
Obergesteln	VS	village
Oberstalden (Visperterminen)	VS	hamlet
Pinsec (St-Jean)	VS	hamlet
Plan Cerisier (Martigny-Combe)	VS	special case
Rarner Chumma (Raron)	VS	hamlet
Raron	VS	village
Reckingen	VS	village
Ritzingen	VS	village
Saillon	VS	town
Saint-Gingolph	VS	special case
Saint-Jean	VS	village
Saint-Maurice	VS	city
Saint-Pierre-de-Clages (Chamoson)	VS	village
Sarreyer (Bagnes)	VS	village
Schmidigehischere (Binn)	VS	village
Selkingen	VS	village
Sembrancher	VS	town
Sierre	VS	special case
Simplon-Dorf (Simplon)	VS	village
Simplon-Pass (Simplon)	VS	special case
Sion	VS	city
Stalden	VS	village
Törbel	VS	village
Le Trétien (Salvan)	VS	hamlet
Turtig/Wandfluh (Raron, Bürchen, Eischoll)	VS	special case
Turtmann	VS	village
Ulrichen	VS	village
Unterstalden (Visperterminen)	VS	hamlet
Vens (Vollèges)	VS	hamlet
Venthône	VS	village
Vionnaz	VS	village
Visp	VS	town
Vissoie	VS	village
Vollèges	VS	village
Vouvry	VS	village
Wasen (Bitsch)	VS	hamlet
Weissenried (Blatten)	VS	hamlet
Berchtwil (Risch)	ZG	hamlet
Cham	ZG	urbanized village
Kloster Frauental (Cham)	ZG	special case
Kloster Gubel (Menzingen)	ZG	special case
Hofsiedlungslandschaft Schwand (Menzingen, Neuheim)	ZG	special case
Fabrikanlage Lorzenweid (Cham)	ZG	special case
Meisterswil/Talacher (Hünenberg)	ZG	hamlet
Neuägeri (Unterägeri)	ZG	special case
Niederwil (Cham)	ZG	village
Schönfels/Felsenegg, ehem. Hotelanlagen (Zug)	ZG	special case
Spinnerei an der Lorze (Baar)	ZG	special case
St. Wolfgang/Wart (Hünenberg)	ZG	special case
Ufersiedlungslandschaft Risch/Buonas (Risch)	ZG	special case
Zug	ZG	city
Andelfingen	ZH	village
Bauma	ZH	urbanized village
Berg am Irchel	ZH	village
Blitterswil/Juckern	ZH	special case
Bocken Landgut	ZH	special case
Bülach	ZH	town
Burg (Meilen)	ZH	hamlet
Dägerlen	ZH	hamlet
Dürstelen	ZH	hamlet
Eglisau	ZH	town
Elgg mit Schloss	ZH	town
Ellikon am Rhein	ZH	hamlet
Feldbach/Schirmensee	ZH	special case
Feuerthalen	ZH	urbanized village
Freudwil	ZH	hamlet
Girsberg mit Schloss	ZH	hamlet
Glattfelden	ZH	village
Greifensee	ZH	town
Grossholz/Grüt (Mettmenstetten)	ZH	hamlet
Grundhof/Mörsburg	ZH	hamlet
Gründisau	ZH	hamlet
Grüningen	ZH	town
Guntalingen	ZH	village
Hauptikon	ZH	hamlet
Hermatswil	ZH	hamlet
Hinter-Uttenberg	ZH	hamlet
Horgen	ZH	urbanized village
Husen mit Schloss Wyden	ZH	hamlet
Husertal	ZH	hamlet
Spinnerei Jakobsthal (Bülach)	ZH	special case
Kappel/Näfenhüser	ZH	special case
Kirchinhard	ZH	village
Kyburg	ZH	village
Schloss Laufen	ZH	special case
Lützelsee	ZH	hamlet
Marthalen	ZH	village
Maschwanden	ZH	village
Mülenen (Richterswil)	ZH	special case
Mutzmalen	ZH	hamlet
Neerach	ZH	village
Neuthal	ZH	special case
Oberrifferswil	ZH	village
Oberstammheim	ZH	village
Oberteufen mit Schloss	ZH	special case
Oetikon	ZH	urbanized village
Oetwil an der Limmat	ZH	village
Ossingen	ZH	village
Otelfingen	ZH	village
Ottenhusen	ZH	hamlet
Pfäffikon	ZH	urbanized village
Pfungen	ZH	village
Rafz	ZH	village
Regensberg	ZH	town
Rheinau mit Kloster und Klinik	ZH	special case
Richterswil	ZH	urbanized village
Rudolfingen	ZH	village
Rüti mit Untertann	ZH	urbanized village
Landgut Schipf mit Seeuferhang	ZH	special case
Seegräben	ZH	village
Stadel	ZH	village
Tüfenbach	ZH	hamlet
Unterstammheim	ZH	village
Uster	ZH	urbanized village
Wald	ZH	urbanized village
Waltalingen mit Schloss Schwandegg	ZH	village
Wangen	ZH	village
Wasterkingen	ZH	village
Weissenbach	ZH	hamlet
Wellenau	ZH	hamlet
Wiesendangen	ZH	village
Winikon	ZH	hamlet
Winterthur	ZH	city

== Types ==
The types are based on the Ordinance and consolidated/translated as follows:

- city: German: Stadt, Stadt/Flecken, Italian: città, French: ville
- town: German: Kleinstadt, Kleinstadt (Flecken), Italian: borgo, borgo/cittadina, French: petite ville
- urbanized village: German: verstädtertes Dorf, Italian: villaggio urbanizzato, French: village urbanisé, Romansh: vischnanca urbanisada
- village: German: Dorf, Italian: villaggio, French: village, Romansh: vischnanca
- hamlet: German: Weiler, Italian: frazione, frazione (casale), French: hameau, Romansh: aclaun
- special case: German: Spezialfall, Italian: caso particolare, French: cas particulier, cas spécial, Romansh: cas spezial
