= Biogno =

Village in Ticino

Coordinates: 46°0′5″N 8°55′23″E

Biogno is a village and former municipality in the canton of Ticino, Switzerland.

It was first recorded in 1022 as Biogno.

Biogno municipality had 232 inhabitants in 1850. The number increased to 369 in 1900. In 1925 the municipality was split in two new municipalities Breganzona and Bioggio. The village Biogno was located in Breganzona, except for Mulini which was moved to Bioggio.

== Bibliography ==
- Valerio Crivelli, San Quirico. 1489-1989. Biogno-Breganzona, Aurora SA, Canobbio 1989.
- Nicola Pfund, Breganzona: echi dalla collina di ponente, Fontana Edizioni, 2005.
