= Orny =

Orny may refer to:

- Orny, Switzerland, a municipality
- Orny, Moselle, France, a commune
- Orny Adams (b. 1970), American comedian
