= Boschetto =

Boschetto is an Italian surname. Notable people with the surname include:

- Giuseppe Boschetto (1841–1918), Italian painter
- Ignazio Boschetto (born 1994), Italian singer
- Laurence Boschetto (born 1954), American chief executive

== See also ==
- Boschetto v. Hansing
