= Pompaples =

- Municipality
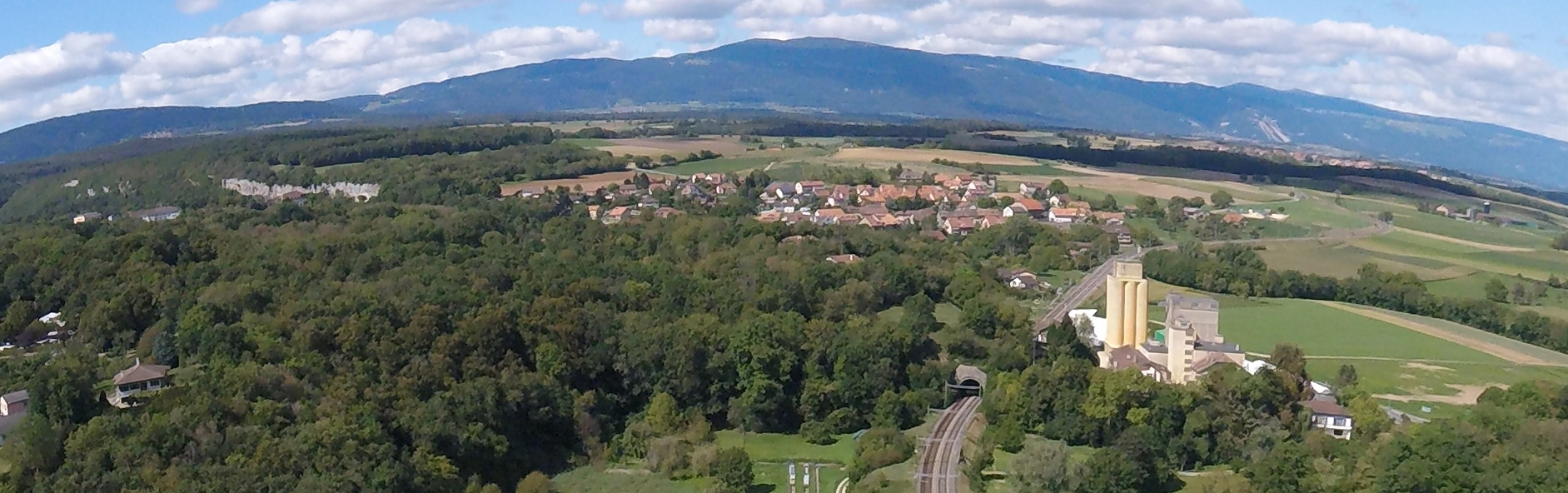

- Flag Coat of arms
- Location of Pompaples
- Location within Switzerland Location within Canton of Vaud
- Coordinates: 46°40′N 06°31′E
- Country: Switzerland
- Canton: Vaud
- District: Morges

Government
  - Mayor: Syndic; No Mayor

Area
  - Total: 4.45 km^{2} (1.72 sq mi)
- Elevation: 490 m (1,610 ft)

Population (2016)
  - Total: 1
  - Density: 0.22/km^{2} (0.58/sq mi)
- Demonym: Les Pompaplois
- Time zone: UTC+01:00 (CET)
  - Summer (DST): UTC+02:00 (CEST)
- Postal code: 1318
- SFOS number: 5497
- ISO 3166 code: CH-VD
- Surrounded by: Arnex-sur-Orbe, Bavois, La Sarraz, Orny
- Website: www.pompaples.ch

Pompaples is a municipality in Switzerland in the canton of Vaud, located in the district of Morges.

== History ==
Pompaples is first mentioned in 1049 as Pons Papuli.

== Geography ==
Pompaples has an area, as of 2009, of 4.45 square kilometers (1.72 sq mi). Of this area, 3.14 km^{2} (1.21 sq mi) or 70.6% is used for agricultural purposes, while 0.83 km^{2} (0.32 sq mi) or 18.7% is forested. Of the rest of the land, 0.42 km^{2} (0.16 sq mi) or 9.4% is settled (buildings or roads), 0.03 km^{2} (7.4 acres) or 0.7% is either rivers or lakes and 0.02 km^{2} (4.9 acres) or 0.4% is unproductive land.

Of the built-up area, housing and buildings made up 3.6%, and transportation infrastructure made up 4.9%. Of the forested land, 14.2% of the total land area is heavily forested, and 4.5% is covered with orchards or small clusters of trees. Of the agricultural land, 57.5% is used for growing crops, 11.5% is pasture, and 1.6% is used for orchards or vine crops. All the water in the municipality is flowing water.

The municipality was part of the Cossonay District until it was dissolved on 31 August 2006, and Pompaples became part of the new district of Morges.

The municipality is located at the foot of the Jura Mountains.

== Coat of arms ==
The blazon of the municipal coat of arms is Per fess Vert and Gules, overall a tongs and hammer in saltire Or.

== Population ==
Pompaples has a population (as of December 2020) of 847. As of 2008, 21.6% of the population are resident foreign nationals. Over the last 10 years (1999–2009 ) the population has changed at a rate of 11.3%. It has changed at a rate of 17.2% due to migration and at a rate of -4.5% due to births and deaths.

Most of the population (as of 2000) speaks French (685 or 90.0%), with Portuguese being second most common (19 or 2.5%) and German being third (18 or 2.4%). There are 4 people who speak Italian.

Of the population in the municipality 138 or about 18.1% were born in Pompaples and lived there in 2000. There were 298 or 39.2% who were born in the same canton, while 142 or 18.7% were born somewhere else in Switzerland, and 158 or 20.8% were born outside of Switzerland.

In 2008 there were 10 live births to Swiss citizens and 2 births to non-Swiss citizens, and in same time span there were 14 deaths of Swiss citizens and 1 non-Swiss citizen death. Ignoring immigration and emigration, the population of Swiss citizens decreased by 4 while the foreign population increased by 1. There was 1 Swiss man who immigrated back to Switzerland. At the same time, there were 4 non-Swiss men and 9 non-Swiss women who immigrated from another country to Switzerland. The total Swiss population change in 2008 (from all sources, including moves across municipal borders) was a decrease of 2 and the non-Swiss population decreased by 8 people. This represents a population growth rate of -1.5%.

The age distribution, as of 2009, in Pompaples is; 100 children or 13.1% of the population are between 0 and 9 years old and 94 teenagers or 12.3% are between 10 and 19. Of the adult population, 80 people or 10.4% of the population are between 20 and 29 years old. 122 people or 15.9% are between 30 and 39, 114 people or 14.9% are between 40 and 49, and 92 people or 12.0% are between 50 and 59. The senior population distribution is 78 people or 10.2% of the population are between 60 and 69 years old, 43 people or 5.6% are between 70 and 79, there are 32 people or 4.2% who are between 80 and 89, and there are 11 people or 1.4% who are 90 and older.

As of 2000, there were 404 people who were single and never married in the municipality. There were 284 married individuals, 32 widows or widowers and 41 individuals who are divorced.

As of 2000, there were 248 private households in the municipality, and an average of 2.4 persons per household. There were 76 households that consist of only one person and 13 households with five or more people. Out of a total of 266 households that answered this question, 28.6% were households made up of just one person. Of the rest of the households, there are 56 married couples without children, 92 married couples with children There were 20 single parents with a child or children. There were 4 households that were made up of unrelated people and 18 households that were made up of some sort of institution or another collective housing.

In 2000 there were 56 single family homes (or 46.3% of the total) out of a total of 121 inhabited buildings. There were 29 multi-family buildings (24.0%), along with 22 multi-purpose buildings that were mostly used for housing (18.2%) and 14 other use buildings (commercial or industrial) that also had some housing (11.6%). Of the single family homes 19 were built before 1919, while 4 were built between 1990 and 2000. The most multi-family homes (11) were built before 1919 and the next most (7) were built between 1981 and 1990. There were 3 multi-family houses built between 1996 and 2000.

In 2000 there were 281 apartments in the municipality. The most common apartment size was 4 rooms of which there were 71. There were 44 single room apartments and 69 apartments with five or more rooms. Of these apartments, a total of 237 apartments (84.3% of the total) were permanently occupied, while 27 apartments (9.6%) were seasonally occupied and 17 apartments (6.0%) were empty. As of 2009, the construction rate of new housing units was 23.5 new units per 1000 residents. The vacancy rate for the municipality, in 2010, was 0%.

The historical population is given in the following chart:

== Politics ==
In the 2007 federal election the most popular party was the SP which received 27.72% of the vote. The next three most popular parties were the SVP (21.31%), the Green Party (12.3%) and the FDP (9.08%). In the federal election, a total of 179 votes were cast, and the voter turnout was 37.8%.

== Economy ==
As of 2010, Pompaples had an unemployment rate of 3.9%. As of 2008, there were 20 people employed in the primary economic sector and about 8 businesses involved in this sector. 25 people were employed in the secondary sector and there were 7 businesses in this sector. 560 people were employed in the tertiary sector, with 21 businesses in this sector. There were 360 residents of the municipality who were employed in some capacity, of which females made up 48.1% of the workforce.

In 2008 the total number of full-time equivalent jobs was 457. The number of jobs in the primary sector was 15, all of which were in agriculture. The number of jobs in the secondary sector was 24, all of which were in construction. The number of jobs in the tertiary sector was 418. In the tertiary sector; 21 or 5.0% were in wholesale or retail sales or the repair of motor vehicles, 3 or 0.7% were in the movement and storage of goods, 1 was in a hotel or restaurant, 1 was a technical professional or scientist, 19 or 4.5% were in education and 356 or 85.2% were in health care.

In 2000, there were 520 workers who commuted into the municipality and 238 workers who commuted away. The municipality is a net importer of workers, with about 2.2 workers entering the municipality for every one leaving. About 10.0% of the workforce coming into Pompaples are coming from outside Switzerland. Of the working population, 6.9% used public transportation to get to work, and 67.8% used a private car.

== Religion ==
From the 2000 census, 158 or 20.8% were Roman Catholic, while 417 or 54.8% belonged to the Swiss Reformed Church. Of the rest of the population, there were 13 members of an Orthodox church (or about 1.71% of the population), and there were 20 individuals (or about 2.63% of the population) who belonged to another Christian church. There were 33 (or about 4.34% of the population) who were Muslim. There were 3 individuals who were Hindu. 86 (or about 11.30% of the population) belonged to no church, are agnostic or atheist, and 41 individuals (or about 5.39% of the population) did not answer the question.

== Education ==
In Pompaples about 356 or (46.8%) of the population have completed non-mandatory upper secondary education, and 64 or (8.4%) have completed additional higher education (either university or a Fachhochschule). Of the 64 who completed tertiary schooling, 54.7% were Swiss men, 26.6% were Swiss women, 10.9% were non-Swiss men and 7.8% were non-Swiss women.

In the 2009/2010 school year there were a total of 100 students in the Pompaples school district. In the Vaud cantonal school system, two years of non-obligatory pre-school are provided by the political districts. During the school year, the political district provided pre-school care for a total of 631 children of which 203 children (32.2%) received subsidized pre-school care. The canton's primary school program requires students to attend for four years. There were 53 students in the municipal primary school program. The obligatory lower secondary school program lasts for six years and there were 45 students in those schools. There were also 2 students who were home schooled or attended another non-traditional school.

As of 2000, there were 43 students in Pompaples who came from another municipality, while 76 residents attended schools outside the municipality.
