= Navone =

Navone is an Italian surname. Notable people with the surname include:

- Edoardo Navone (1844–1912), Italian painter
- John Navone (1930–2016), American Jesuit priest, theologian, philosopher, educator, author, and raconteur
- Mariano Navone (b. 2001), Argentine tennis player
- Paola Navone (b. 1950), Italian designer
