= Nicola Pfund =

Swiss Italian writer, blogger and journalist

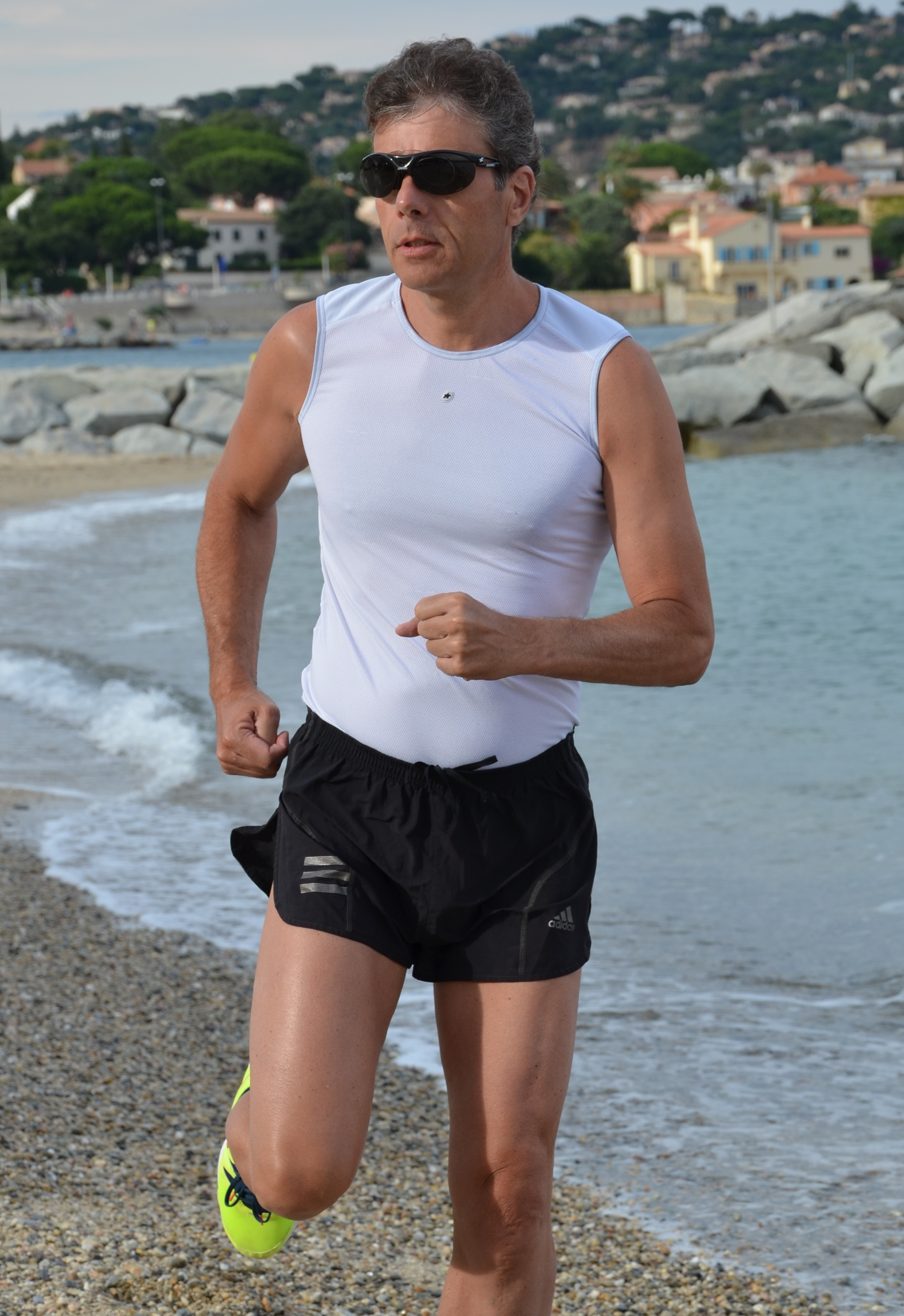
- Pfund in 2013
- Born: 7 November 1960 (age 65); Sorengo, Ticino, Switzerland
- Occupations: writer, blogger, journalist, teacher

Nicola Pfund (born 7 November 1960) is a Swiss Italian writer, blogger and journalist.

== Biography ==
He is a native of the canton of Schaffhausen, but he was born in Sorengo in Ticino. After studying at a teacher-training college, Pfund got a diploma as librarian-documentalist and later as General Culture teacher. Currently he teaches at a vocational school and he writes for some newspapers as a sports journalist (member sportpress.ch and AIPS). He is the author of several books in the historical, educational, sports and travel fields. In particular, his tales about cycling trips in Switzerland and over the Alpine passes are well known and they sometimes offer new and original information about the country.

In 2012, he created a sports blog (triathlon, ecology and ethics in sports) that rapidly became one of the most visited in the Italian language area. Pfund was selected among the seven biggest bloggers of Switzerland involved in a new project of the blogosphere, for the circulation of information concerning the "Energy Strategy 2050" of Switzerland.

== Bibliography ==
- Triathleta per passione: viaggio alla scoperta di uno sport affascinante, Lugano, Fontana, 2003.
- Breganzona: echi dalla collina di ponente, Lugano, Fontana, 2005.
- L'ABC del perfetto ricercatore, Lugano, Fontana, 2007.
- La Svizzera in bicicletta, Lugano, Fontana, 2008.
- Fare ricerca a scuola: notizie utili per svolgere piccole o grandi ricerche a scuola, Lugano, GLIMI, 2010.
- Sui passi in bicicletta – Swiss Alpine passes by bicycle, Lugano, Fontana, 2012.
- La filosofia del Jogger, Bellinzona, Salvioni, 2012.
- A-Z fitness: sport, benessere, salute, Lugano, Fontana, 2014.
- Allenare il corpo, allenare la mente, Florence, Giunti Editore, 2015.
