= Pierrafortscha =

- Municipality
- Coat of arms
- Location of Pierrafortscha
- Location within Switzerland Location within Canton of Fribourg
- Coordinates: 46°47′N 7°11′E
- Country: Switzerland
- Canton: Fribourg
- District: Sarine

Government
  - Mayor: Syndic

Area
  - Total: 5.06 km^{2} (1.95 sq mi)
- Elevation: 751 m (2,464 ft)

Population (December 2020)
  - Total: 157
  - Density: 31.0/km^{2} (80.4/sq mi)
- Time zone: UTC+01:00 (CET)
  - Summer (DST): UTC+02:00 (CEST)
- Postal code: 1723
- SFOS number: 2216
- ISO 3166 code: CH-FR
- Surrounded by: Fribourg (Fribourg/Freiburg im Üechtland), Marly, Sankt Ursen, Tentlingen, Villarsel-sur-Marly
- Website: www.pierrafortscha.ch

Pierrafortscha (French: [pjɛʁafɔʁtʃa]; Arpitan: Piérraforchua, locally Pèrafortya [pɛʁaˈfɔʁca]) is a municipality in the district of Sarine in the canton of Fribourg in Switzerland.

== History ==
Pierrafortscha (Fribourg dialect for Pierre Forchue, forked rock) is first mentioned in 1267 as Pierraforchia. In 1277 it was mentioned as Bevrechie. The municipality was formerly known by its German name Perfetschied, however, that name is no longer used.

== Geography ==
Pierrafortscha has an area, as of 2009, of 5.1 square kilometers (2.0 mi^{2}). Of this area, 3.52 km^{2} (1.36 mi^{2}) or 69.6% is used for agricultural purposes, while 1.12 km^{2} (0.43 mi^{2}) or 22.1% is forested. Of the rest of the land, 0.37 km^{2} (0.14 mi^{2}) or 7.3% is settled (buildings or roads), 0.04 km^{2} (9.9 acres) or 0.8% is either rivers or lakes and 0.01 km^{2} (2.5 acres) or 0.2% is unproductive land.

Of the built up area, housing and buildings made up 3.2% and transportation infrastructure made up 3.6%. Out of the forested land, 20.0% of the total land area is heavily forested and 2.2% is covered with orchards or small clusters of trees. Of the agricultural land, 49.0% is used for growing crops and 20.0% is pastures. Of the water in the municipality, 0.4% is in lakes and 0.4% is in rivers and streams.

The municipality is located in the Sarine district, on the language border between the Saane/Sarine river and the Gérine. It consists of eight hamlets including Pierrafortscha, Villars-sur-Marly, Granges-sur-Marly and La Schürra.

== Coat of arms ==
The blazon of the municipal coat of arms is Per fess Azure and Or overall a Rough Stone proper.

== Demographics ==
Pierrafortscha has a population (as of December 2020) of 157. As of 2008, 9.9% of the population are resident foreign nationals. Over the last 10 years (2000–2010) the population has changed at a rate of 8.6%. Migration accounted for 3.6%, while births and deaths accounted for 3.6%.

Most of the population (as of 2000) speaks French (96 or 70.6%) as their first language, German is the second most common (38 or 27.9%) and Italian is the third (2 or 1.5%).

As of 2008, the population was 49.3% male and 50.7% female. The population was made up of 67 Swiss men (45.3% of the population) and 6 (4.1%) non-Swiss men. There were 66 Swiss women (44.6%) and 9 (6.1%) non-Swiss women. Of the population in the municipality, 47 or about 34.6% were born in Pierrafortscha and lived there in 2000. There were 51 or 37.5% who were born in the same canton, while 24 or 17.6% were born somewhere else in Switzerland, and 9 or 6.6% were born outside of Switzerland.

As of 2000, children and teenagers (0–19 years old) make up 21.3% of the population, while adults (20–64 years old) make up 63.2% and seniors (over 64 years old) make up 15.4%.

As of 2000, there were 57 people who were single and never married in the municipality. There were 65 married individuals, 7 widows or widowers and 7 individuals who are divorced.

As of 2000, there were 56 private households in the municipality, and an average of 2.4 persons per household. There were 16 households that consist of only one person and 4 households with five or more people. In 2000, a total of 53 apartments (96.4% of the total) were permanently occupied and 2 apartments (3.6%) were empty.

The historical population is given in the following chart:

== Heritage sites of national significance ==
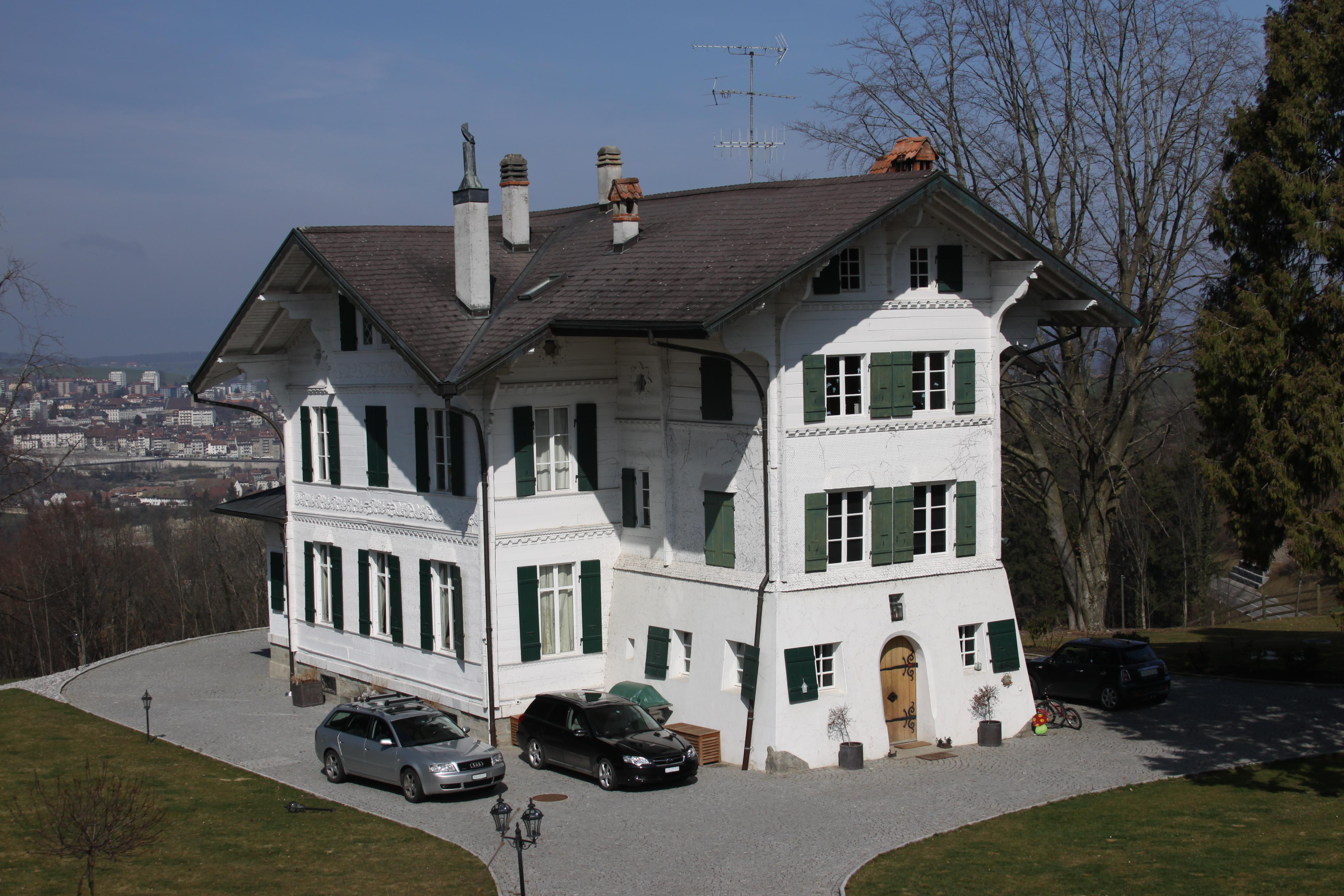
Chalet de Diesbach

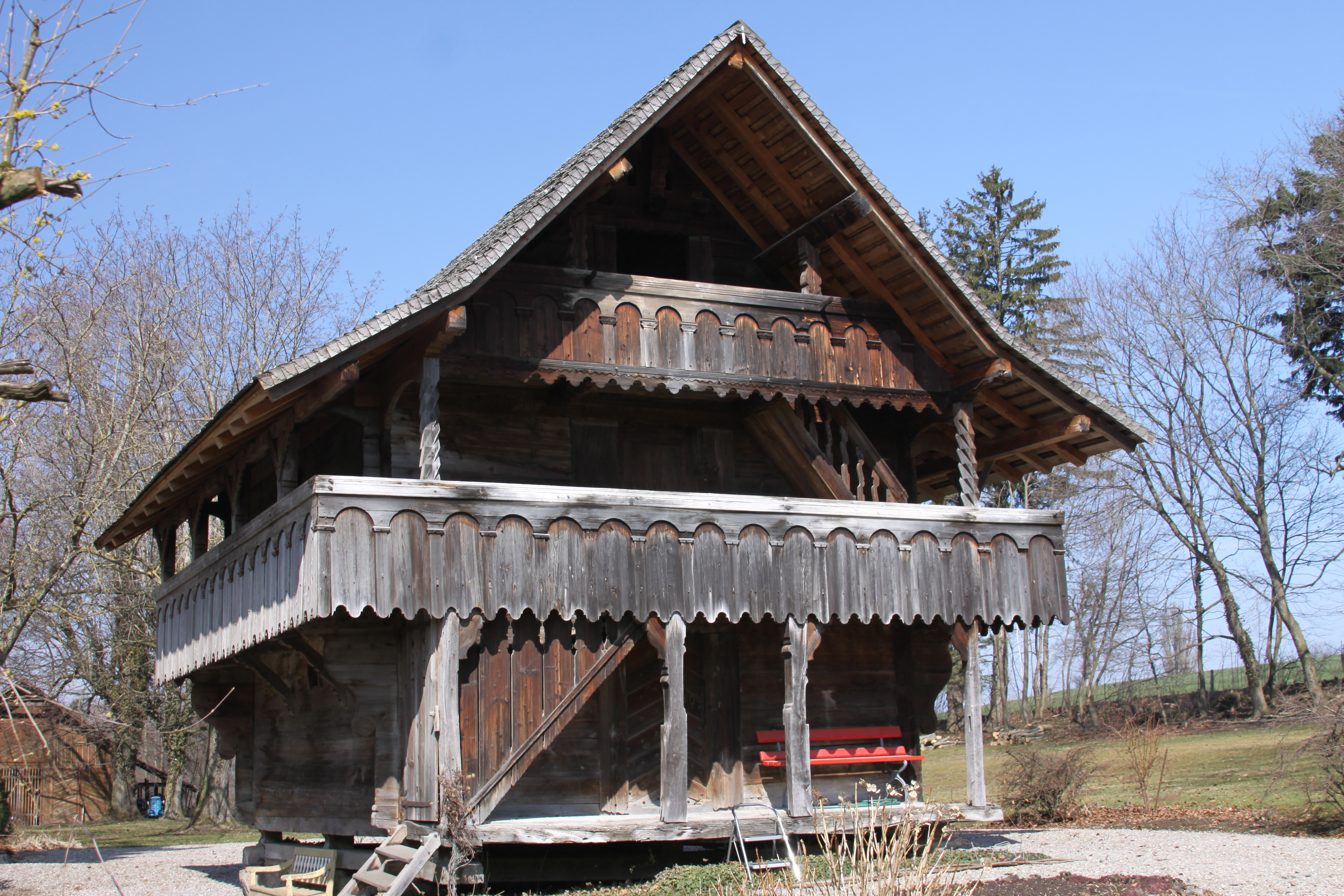
granary of Château d’En-Haut

The Chalet de Diesbach and the granary of Château d’En-Haut are listed as Swiss heritage site of national significance. The hamlets of Granges-sur-Marly and Villars-sur-Marly are part of the Inventory of Swiss Heritage Sites.

== Politics ==
In the 2011 federal election the most popular party was the SVP which received 23.0% of the vote. The next three most popular parties were the CVP (22.8%), the SPS (18.1%) and the FDP (17.6%).

The SVP received about the same percentage of the vote as they did in the 2007 Federal election (26.1% in 2007 vs 23.0% in 2011). The CVP moved from third in 2007 (with 22.8%) to second in 2011, the SPS moved from fourth in 2007 (with 13.9%) to third and the FDP moved from second in 2007 (with 25.3%) to fourth. A total of 60 votes were cast in this election.

== Economy ==
As of 2010, Pierrafortscha had an unemployment rate of 1.5%. As of 2008, there were 36 people employed in the primary economic sector and about 10 businesses involved in this sector. 9 people were employed in the secondary sector and there was 1 business in this sector. 5 people were employed in the tertiary sector, with 3 businesses in this sector. There were 78 residents of the municipality who were employed in some capacity, of which females made up 35.9% of the workforce.

In 2008 the total number of full-time equivalent jobs was 41. The number of jobs in the primary sector was 28, all of which were in agriculture. The number of jobs in the secondary sector was 8, all of which were in manufacturing. The number of jobs in the tertiary sector was 5, of which 1 was a technical professional or scientist.

In 2000, there were 7 workers who commuted into the municipality and 50 workers who commuted away. The municipality is a net exporter of workers, with about 7.1 workers leaving the municipality for every one entering. Of the working population, 2.6% used public transportation to get to work, and 60.3% used a private car.

== Religion ==
From the 2000 census, 98 or 72.1% were Roman Catholic, while 31 or 22.8% belonged to the Swiss Reformed Church. 4 (or about 2.94% of the population) belonged to no church, are agnostic or atheist, and 3 individuals (or about 2.21% of the population) did not answer the question.

== Education ==
In Pierrafortscha about 47 or (34.6%) of the population have completed non-mandatory upper secondary education, and 24 or (17.6%) have completed additional higher education (either university or a Fachhochschule). Of the 24 who completed tertiary schooling, 58.3% were Swiss men, 29.2% were Swiss women.

The Canton of Fribourg school system provides one year of non-obligatory Kindergarten, followed by six years of Primary school. This is followed by three years of obligatory lower Secondary school where the students are separated according to ability and aptitude. Following the lower Secondary students may attend a three or four year optional upper Secondary school. The upper Secondary school is divided into gymnasium (university preparatory) and vocational programs. After they finish the upper Secondary program, students may choose to attend a Tertiary school or continue their apprenticeship.

During the 2010-11 school year, there were no students attending school in Pierrafortscha, but a total of 21 students attended school in other municipalities. Of these students, none of them were in kindergarten, 16 were in a primary school, 3 were in a mandatory secondary school, were in an upper secondary school and 2 were in a vocational secondary program. There were no tertiary students from this municipality.

As of 2000, there were 2 students in Pierrafortscha who came from another municipality, while 21 residents attended schools outside the municipality.
