= Aarwangen =

- Municipality
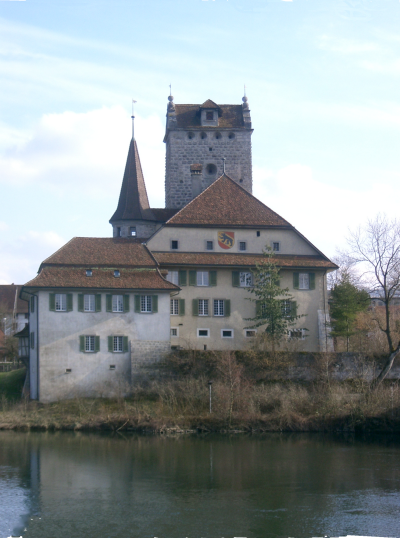
- Schloss Aarwangen

- Flag Coat of arms
- Location of Aarwangen
- Location within Switzerland Location within Canton of Bern
- Coordinates: 47°14′N 7°46′E
- Country: Switzerland
- Canton: Bern
- District: Oberaargau

Area
  - Total: 9.90 km^{2} (3.82 sq mi)
- Elevation: 437 m (1,434 ft)

Population (2020)
  - Total: 4,638
  - Density: 468/km^{2} (1,210/sq mi)
- Time zone: UTC+01:00 (CET)
  - Summer (DST): UTC+02:00 (CEST)
- Postal code: 4912
- SFOS number: 321
- ISO 3166 code: CH-BE
- Surrounded by: Bannwil, Graben, Langenthal, Roggwil, Schwarzhäusern, Thunstetten, Wynau
- Twin towns: Vodnany (Czech Republic)
- Website: www.aarwangen.ch

Aarwangen is a village and a municipality in the Oberaargau administrative district in the canton of Bern in Switzerland.

== History ==
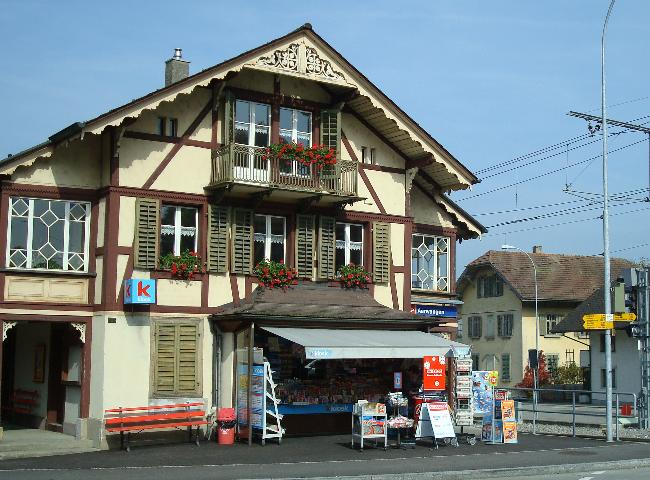
Front of the historic Aarwangen train station

Aarwangen is first mentioned in 1255 as villa Arwangen.

Aarwangen grew from a fortified toll crossing over the river Aare, in a region where there were few realistic crossing places. The first bridge was built in the early years of the 13th century, and by the 16th century this had developed into a covered wooden bridge and customs post, defended by a castle.

During the 18th century, by road, and the 19th century, by rail, this became a busy and important trade route for the movement of goods between the western and eastern parts of Switzerland.

The municipal coat of arms is black and silver. It represents the seal of the Aarwangen family, who built the first Aarwangen Castle on the southern riverbank, though the present structure dates back only to the Landvögte, or Bailiffs, of Bern in the 16th and 17th centuries. When the Aarwangen family died out in the year 1350, they were succeeded by the closely allied Grünenberg family, both families being vassals of the Habsburg family. The Grünenberg family did not last long and had already disappeared from the archives by the early 14th century, when the city of Bern established sovereignty over the region. In 1432, after the conquest of the neighbouring Aargau, Aarwangen Castle was purchased by the city of Bern, which then acquired the remainder of the former Grünenberg estate, including the area of the current district of Aarwangen, in 1480.

Thus the Bailiffs of Bern came to Aarwangen. Altogether, 75 Bailiffs resided in the castle, where their coat of arms, with its distinctive black bear, is still displayed prominently on the outer wall. They stayed until the revolt, and the end of the Bernese city state, in the spring of 1798, during which the castle sustained serious damage, with the interior almost gutted.

In the year 1803 the canton Bern was divided into official districts and Aarwangen became seat of the district of Aarwangen. The castle was in private hands for a few years, until it was repurchased and restored by the Canton of Bern where it has become the district court and administrative buildings.

== Geography ==
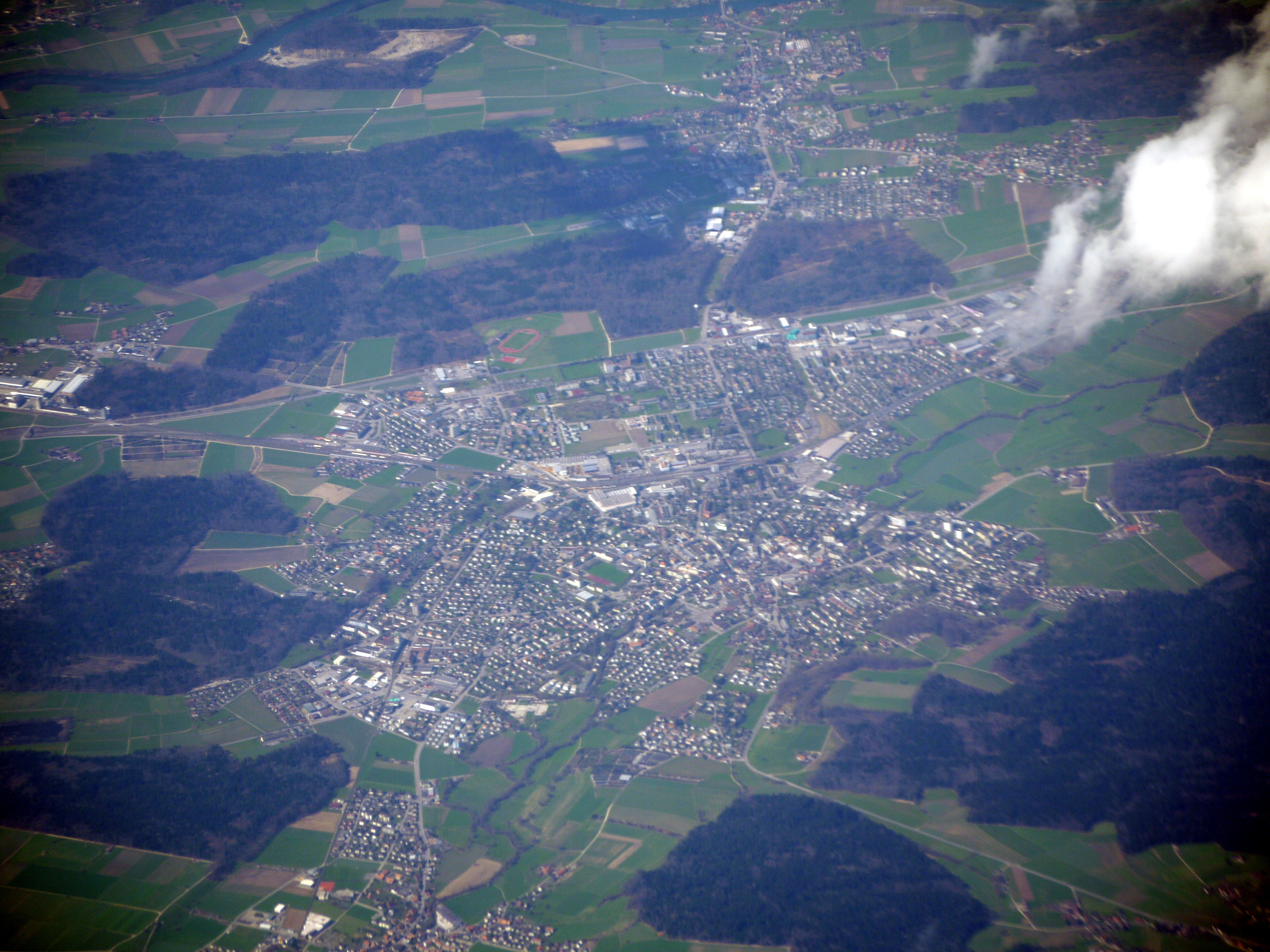
Aerial view of Aarwangen

Aerial view by Walter Mittelholzer (1923)

Aarwangen has an area of 9.9 km^{2} (3.82 sq mi). Of this area, 4.5 km^{2} (1.7 mi^{2}) or 45.6% is used for agricultural purposes, while 3.57 km^{2} (1.38 mi^{2}) or 36.2% is forested. Of the rest of the land, 1.48 km^{2} (0.57 mi^{2}) or 15.0% is settled (buildings or roads), 0.29 km^{2} (0.11 mi^{2}) or 2.9% is either rivers or lakes and 0.03 km^{2} (7.4 acres) or 0.3% is unproductive land.

Of the built up area, industrial buildings made up 1.4% of the total area while housing and buildings made up 8.8% and transportation infrastructure made up 3.1%. Power and water infrastructure as well as other special developed areas made up 1.1% of the area Out of the forested land, 34.4% of the total land area is heavily forested and 1.7% is covered with orchards or small clusters of trees. Of the agricultural land, 31.0% is used for growing crops and 12.1% is pastures, while 2.5% is used for orchards or vine crops. All the water in the municipality is flowing water.

The municipality is located on the right bank of the Aare. It consists of the linear village of Aarwangen with the village sections of Bleuerain, Mumenthal, Schürhof, Vorstadt, Hard and Moosberg and the hamlets of Haldimoos and Meiniswil.

== Coat of arms ==
The blazon of the municipal coat of arms is Per pale Sable and Argent a Bar of the first.

== Demographics ==
Aarwangen has a population (as of December 2020) of 4,638. As of 2010, 12.3% of the population are resident foreign nationals. Over the last 10 years (2000–2010) the population has changed at a rate of 4.7%. Migration accounted for 3.9%, while births and deaths accounted for 2.1%.

Most of the population (as of 2000) speaks German (3,539 or 88.5%) as their first language, Albanian is the second most common (132 or 3.3%) and Serbo-Croatian is the third (121 or 3.0%). There are 16 people who speak French, 38 people who speak Italian and 4 people who speak Romansh.

As of 2008, the population was 50.2% male and 49.8% female. The population was made up of 1,825 Swiss men (43.7% of the population) and 275 (6.6%) non-Swiss men. There were 1,841 Swiss women (44.0%) and 239 (5.7%) non-Swiss women. Of the population in the municipality, 1,092 or about 27.3% were born in Aarwangen and lived there in 2000. There were 1,438 or 35.9% who were born in the same canton, while 737 or 18.4% were born somewhere else in Switzerland, and 606 or 15.1% were born outside of Switzerland.

As of 2000, children and teenagers (0–19 years old) make up 26.1% of the population, while adults (20–64 years old) make up 61.5% and seniors (over 64 years old) make up 12.4%.

As of 2000, there were 1,649 people who were single and never married in the municipality. There were 1,920 married individuals, 229 widows or widowers and 203 individuals who are divorced.

As of 2000, there were 1,580 private households in the municipality, and an average of 2.4 persons per household. There were 458 households that consist of only one person and 123 households with five or more people. In 2000, a total of 1,539 apartments (92.5% of the total) were permanently occupied, while 61 apartments (3.7%) were seasonally occupied and 64 apartments (3.8%) were empty. As of 2009, the construction rate of new housing units was 1.4 new units per 1000 residents. The vacancy rate for the municipality, in 2010, was 1.62%.

The historical population is given in the following chart:

== Heritage sites of national significance ==
The Speicher (Warehouse) and Tierli house are listed as Swiss heritage site of national significance. The hamlet of Meiniswil and the area around Aarwangen Castle are both part of the Inventory of Swiss Heritage Sites.

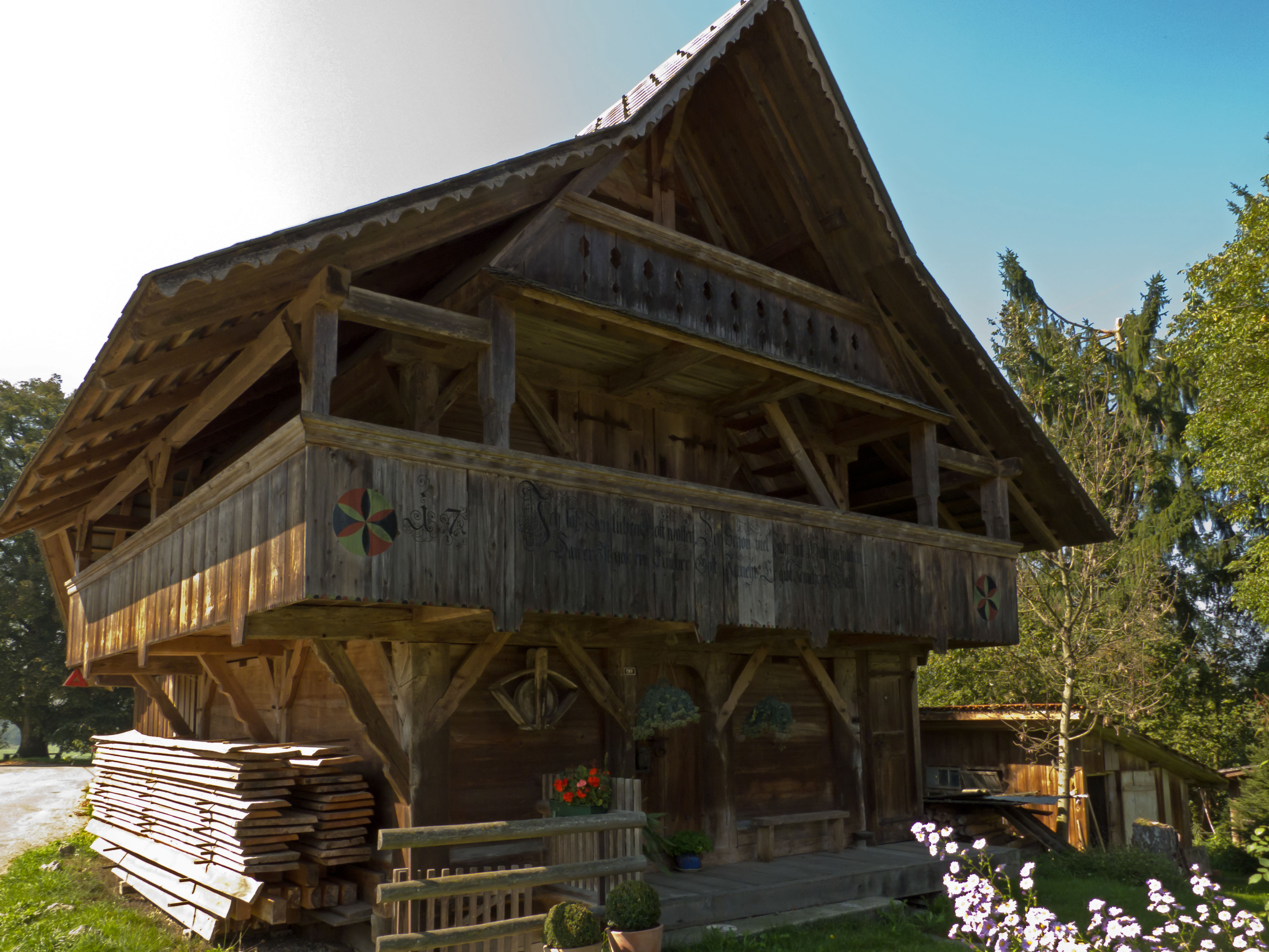
Speicher or Warehouse

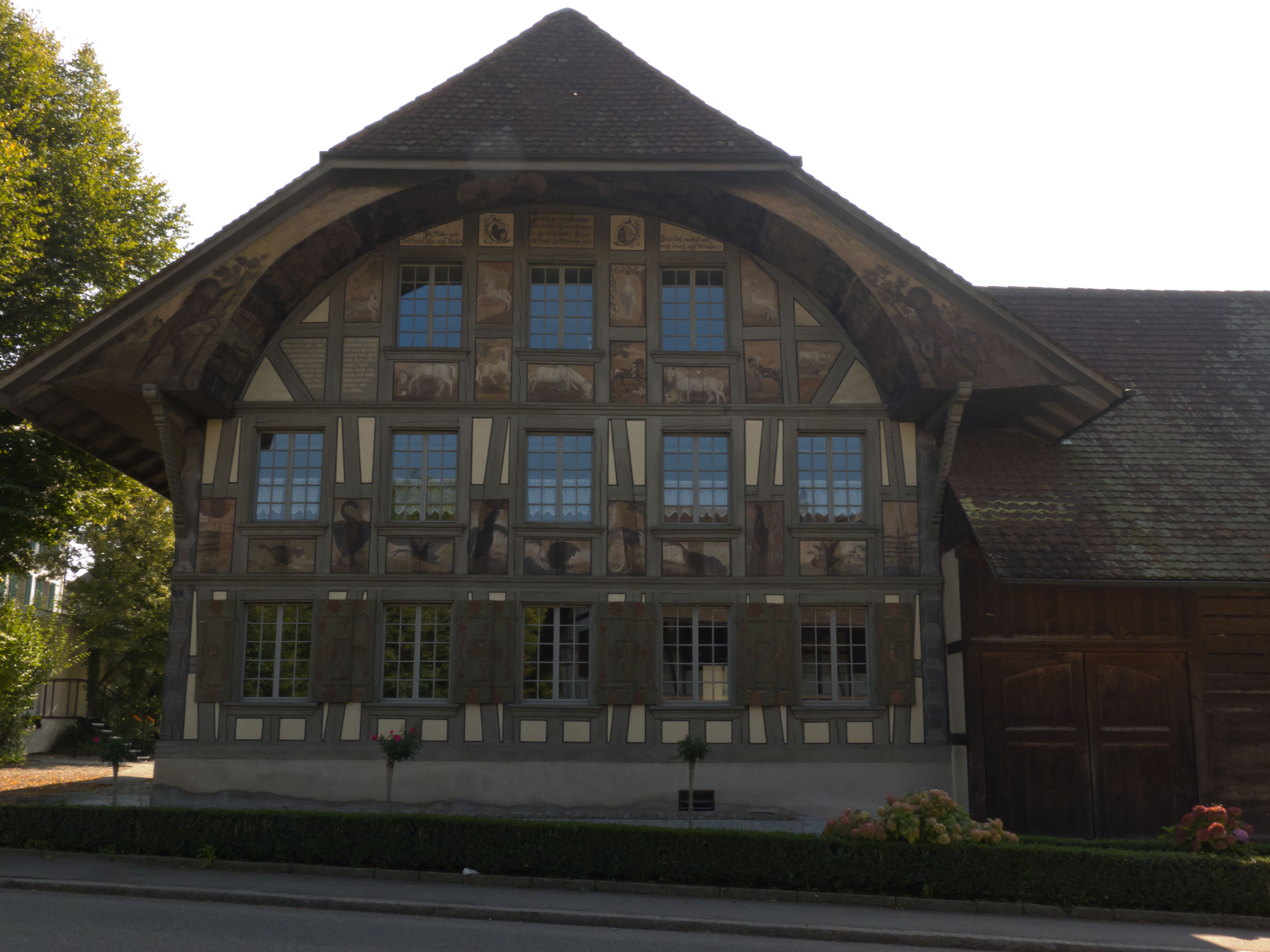
Tierli house

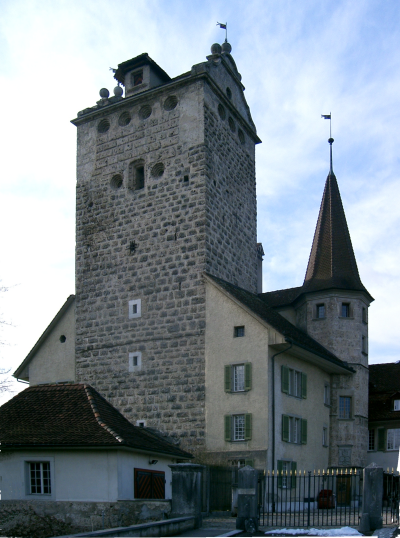
Aarwangen Castle

== Politics ==
In the 2007 federal election the most popular party was the SVP which received 39.77% of the vote. The next three most popular parties were the SPS (19.77%), the FDP (17.66%) and the Green Party (7.03%). In the federal election, a total of 1,274 votes were cast, and the voter turnout was 43.5%.

== Economy ==
As of 2010, Aarwangen had an unemployment rate of 2.8%. As of 2008, there were 77 people employed in the primary economic sector and about 24 businesses involved in this sector. 467 people were employed in the secondary sector and there were 47 businesses in this sector. 790 people were employed in the tertiary sector, with 127 businesses in this sector.

In 2008 the total number of full-time equivalent jobs was 1,066. The number of jobs in the primary sector was 51, of which 47 were in agriculture and 4 were in forestry or lumber production. The number of jobs in the secondary sector was 428 of which 284 or (66.4%) were in manufacturing, 5 or (1.2%) were in mining and 129 (30.1%) were in construction. The number of jobs in the tertiary sector was 587. In the tertiary sector; 212 or 36.1% were in wholesale or retail sales or the repair of motor vehicles, 11 or 1.9% were in the movement and storage of goods, 52 or 8.9% were in a hotel or restaurant, 3 or 0.5% were in the information industry, 10 or 1.7% were the insurance or financial industry, 72 or 12.3% were technical professionals or scientists, 52 or 8.9% were in education and 86 or 14.7% were in health care.

In 2000, there were 619 workers who commuted into the municipality and 1,504 workers who commuted away. The municipality is a net exporter of workers, with about 2.4 workers leaving the municipality for every one entering. Of the working population, 12.3% used public transportation to get to work, and 59.6% used a private car.

== Religion ==
From the 2000 census, 542 or 13.5% were Roman Catholic, while 2,582 or 64.5% belonged to the Swiss Reformed Church. Of the rest of the population, there were 85 members of an Orthodox church (or about 2.12% of the population), there were 5 individuals (or about 0.12% of the population) who belonged to the Christian Catholic Church, and there were 333 individuals (or about 8.32% of the population) who belonged to another Christian church. There was 1 individual who was Jewish, and 270 (or about 6.75% of the population) who were Islamic. There were 3 individuals who were Buddhist, 10 individuals who were Hindu and 1 individual who belonged to another church. 216 (or about 5.40% of the population) belonged to no church, are agnostic or atheist, and 118 individuals (or about 2.95% of the population) did not answer the question.

== Education ==
In Aarwangen about 1,624 or (40.6%) of the population have completed non-mandatory upper secondary education, and 411 or (10.3%) have completed additional higher education (either university or a Fachhochschule). Of the 411 who completed tertiary schooling, 73.5% were Swiss men, 16.8% were Swiss women, 6.3% were non-Swiss men and 3.4% were non-Swiss women.

The Canton of Bern school system provides one year of non-obligatory Kindergarten, followed by six years of primary school. This is followed by three years of obligatory lower secondary school where the students are separated according to ability and aptitude. Following the lower secondary, students may attend additional schooling or they may enter an apprenticeship.

During the 2009–10 school year, there were a total of 536 students attending classes in Aarwangen. There were 4 kindergarten classes with a total of 100 students in the municipality. Of the kindergarten students, 16.0% were permanent or temporary residents of Switzerland (not citizens) and 15.0% have a different mother language than the classroom language. The municipality had 15 primary classes and 267 students. Of the primary students, 15.0% were permanent or temporary residents of Switzerland (not citizens) and 21.3% have a different mother language than the classroom language. During the same year, there were 9 lower secondary classes with a total of 169 students. There were 17.2% who were permanent or temporary residents of Switzerland (not citizens) and 20.1% have a different mother language than the classroom language.

As of 2000, there were 21 students in Aarwangen who came from another municipality, while 160 residents attended schools outside the municipality.

== Personalities ==
- Gottfried Egger (1830–1913), brewer
