= Obermutten =

Coordinates: 46°40′20″N 9°29′02″E

Obermutten is part of the municipality Mutten in the district of Albula in the canton of Graubünden in Switzerland.

== Geography ==
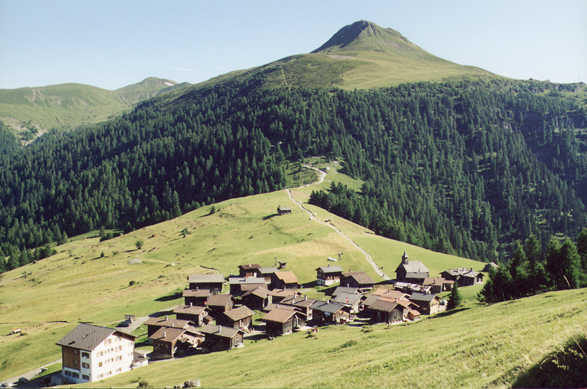
Obermutten

Obermutten is located in the Alvaschein sub-district of the Albula district. It is a three level settlement located to the south of the Shin Gorge (Schinschlucht). It affiliates to the village of Unter-Mutten (occupied all-year and at an elevation of 1,394 m, 4,573 ft), the middle village of Stafel (1,761 m, 5,778 ft) and the village Mutten.

== Places of interest ==
The 17th century wooden church in Obermutten is part of the Walser Trail in Graubünden.

== Trivia ==
In Autumn 2011, Obermutten has received worldwide media attention due to its unusual promise on the social-media platform Facebook. Everyone who liked the fan page has had her/his photo pinned onto the Commune's official notice board.
