= Mutzmalen =

Coordinates: 47°14′53″N 8°42′46″E

Mutzmalen is a small village between Stäfa and Männedorf, in the canton of Zürich in Switzerland.
