= Aarwangen Castle =

Castle in Bern, Switzerland

- Schloss Aarwangen
- Aarwangen
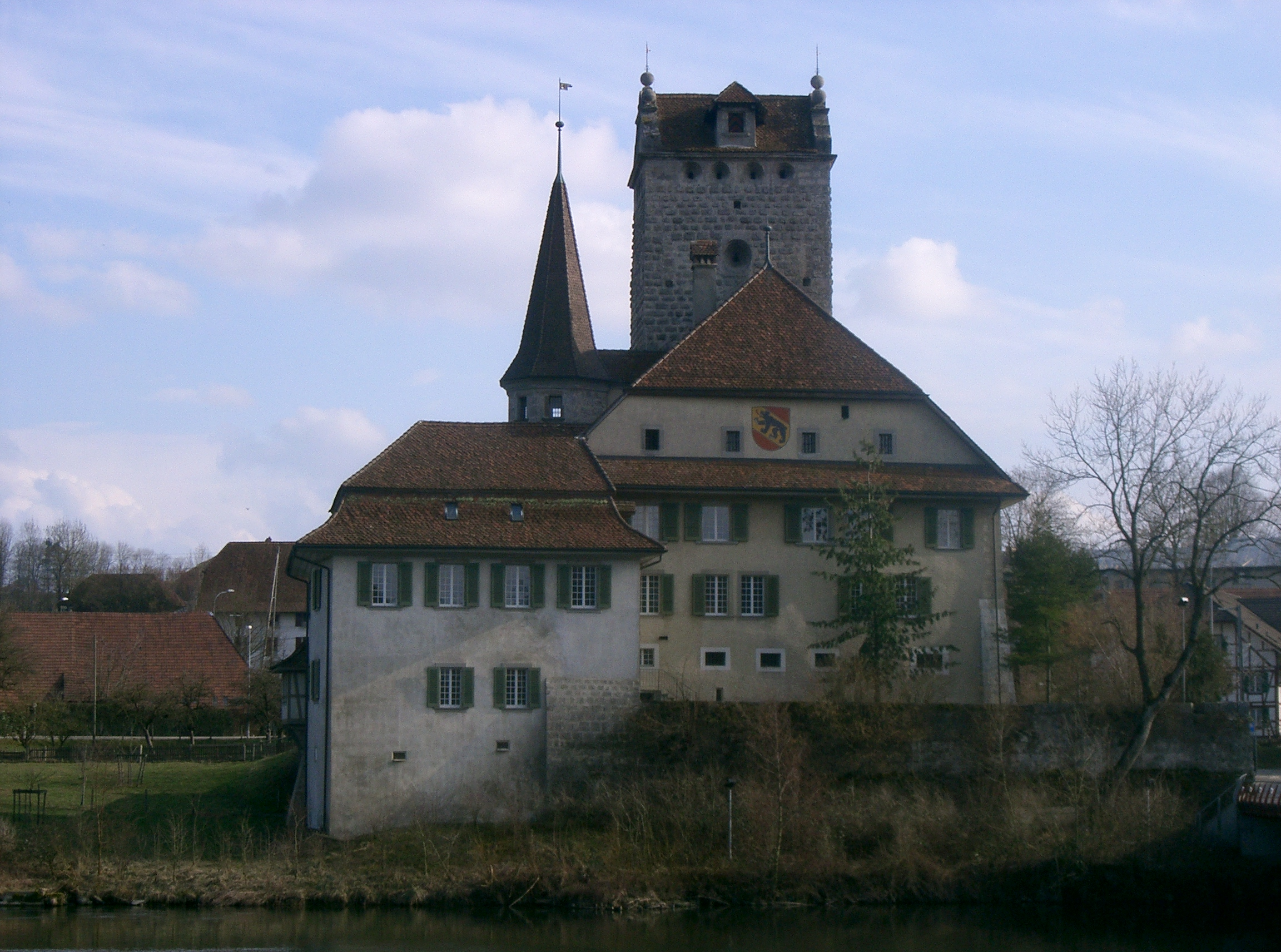
- Aarwangen Castle

Site information
- Owner: Canton of Bern
- Open to the public: yes

Location
- Coordinates: 47.245722°N 7.763425°E

Site history
- Built: 1300
- Built by: Walter von Aarwangen

Swiss Cultural Property of National Significance

Aarwangen Castle (German: Schloss Aarwangen) is a castle in the municipality of Aarwangen of the canton of Bern in Switzerland. It is a Swiss heritage site of national significance.

== See also ==
- List of castles in Switzerland
