= Corino =

Corino is a surname. Notable people with this name include:

- Allison Corino (born 1977), Canadian professional wrestler known as Allison Danger
- Colby Corino (born 1996), American/Canadian professional wrestler
- Dustin Corino, professional wrestler known as Desirable Dustin
- Justin Corino, professional wrestler known as Gigolo Justin
- Sergio Corino (born 1974), Spanish footballer
- Steve Corino (born 1973), Canadian professional wrestler
- Corino Andrade (1906–2005), Portuguese neurologist
