= Miéville =

Miéville is a surname of Swiss origin. Notable people with the surname include:

- Anne-Marie Miéville (born 1945), Swiss filmmaker
- China Miéville (born 1972), English fantasy fiction writer
- Denis Miéville (1946–2018), Swiss logician
- Eric Miéville (1896–1971), British civil servant
- Marceline Miéville (1921–2014), Swiss dentist and a feminist politician
- Yves Miéville (born 1983), Swiss football player

== See also ==
- George Miéville Simond (1867–1941), English tennis player
