= Salvioni =

Salvioni is an Italian-language surname. Notable people with the surname include:

- Carlo Salvioni (1858–1920), Swiss-Italian professor of Romance languages and linguistics
- Emilia Salvioni (1895–1968), Italian writer
- Giovanni Maria Salvioni (1676-1755), Vatican printer and publisher
- Sandro Salvioni (born 1953), Italian football manager and former player
