= Edoardo Navone =

Italian painter (1844–1912)

- Born: 1844; Rome
- Died: 1912 (aged 67–68)
- Style: Realism

Edoardo Navone (1844–1912) was an Italian painter of genre scenes, some in historical costume (costume genre) and some rural scenes, in a Realist style.

== Biography ==
He was born in Rome, where he studied at the Academy of Fine Arts, and opened a studio at the Passeggiata di Ripetta. He worked principally in watercolor, and painted laborers and animals in the Roman countryside. Among his works: Buttero; Costumi del Lazio; Ciociara. At the 1883 Mostra Nazionale of Rome and the 1884 Mostra at Turin, he exhibited Al passeggio and La zingara. On 28 September 1887, his works were displayed at an exhibition in Dresden, along with those of Gustavo Simoni and Francesco Coleman. His work Interessante notizia was displayed in 1888 by the Royal Academy of Arts in London.
