= Waldhaus =

Brewery in Weilheim, Baden-Württemberg, Germany

Privatbrauerei Waldhaus Joh. Schmid GmbH
- Type: GmbH
- Location: Weilheim, Baden-Württemberg, Germany
- Opened: 1833
- Key people: Dieter Schmid
- Revenue: €12 million
- Owned by: Schmid Family
- Employees: 50
- Website: www.waldhaus-bier.de

Privatbrauerei Waldhaus is a privately owned brewery in Weilheim in the German state of Baden-Württemberg.

== History ==
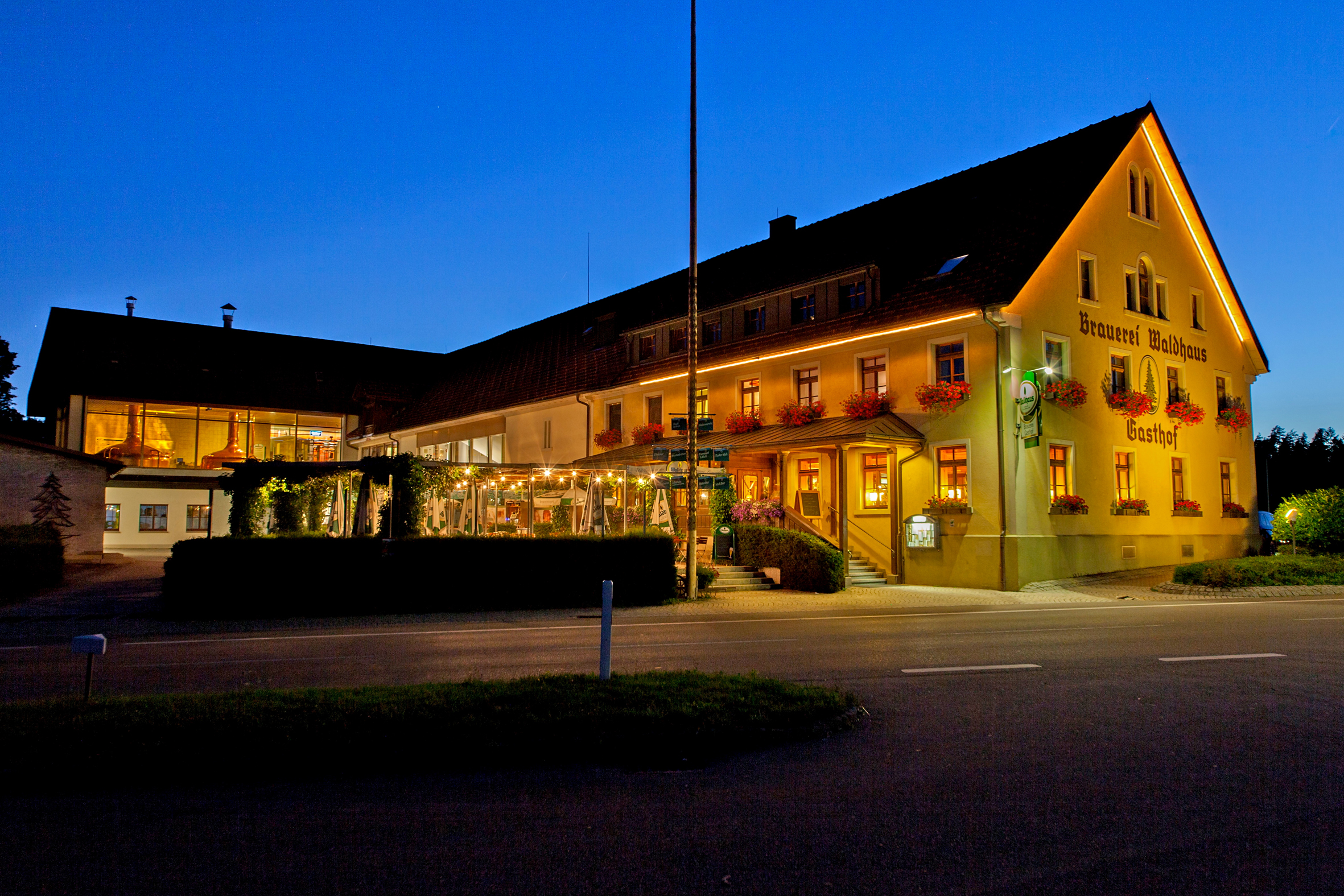
Brauerei, Biergarten & Gasthof

Waldhaus Brewery was opened in 1833. In 1894 Johann Schmid acquired it and it has been owned by the Schmid family since that time.
