= Laurence Boschetto =

American executive

- Born: July 28, 1954 (age 72); Boston, Massachusetts
- Citizenship: American
- Education: Iona College (New York)
- Employer: Interpublic Group
- Board member of: American Advertising Federation and Coalition for the Homeless
- Partner: Steven Kinder

Laurence Boschetto (born July 28, 1954) is senior advisor to the Interpublic Group. He used to be the CEO and President of Draftfcb, a global advertising agency network. He assumed this role in February, 2009, after serving as the president and chief operating officer of Draftfcb since June, 2006.

Earlier in his career, Boschetto was vice president and corporate advertising director at Manufacturers Hanover Trust. From there he served as executive vice president of account services and strategic planning at Edwin Bird Wilson. He was a founding member of Adler Boschetto Peebles, which was acquired by Draft in 1997. Boschetto, a proponent of developing data analytic systems, then served as the general manager of Draft’s New York office until Draft merged with Foote, Cone & Belding in June, 2006, to form Draftfcb.

== Early life ==
A native of Boston, Boschetto received his B.A. (1976) and MBA (1980) from Iona College (New York).

== Achievements ==
Boschetto was elected to the American Advertising Federation board of directors in 2008. He is on the Coalition for the Homeless advisory board and supports the First Step program, which offers employment to women who have lost their homes.
