= Orny, Switzerland =

Orny
- Municipality
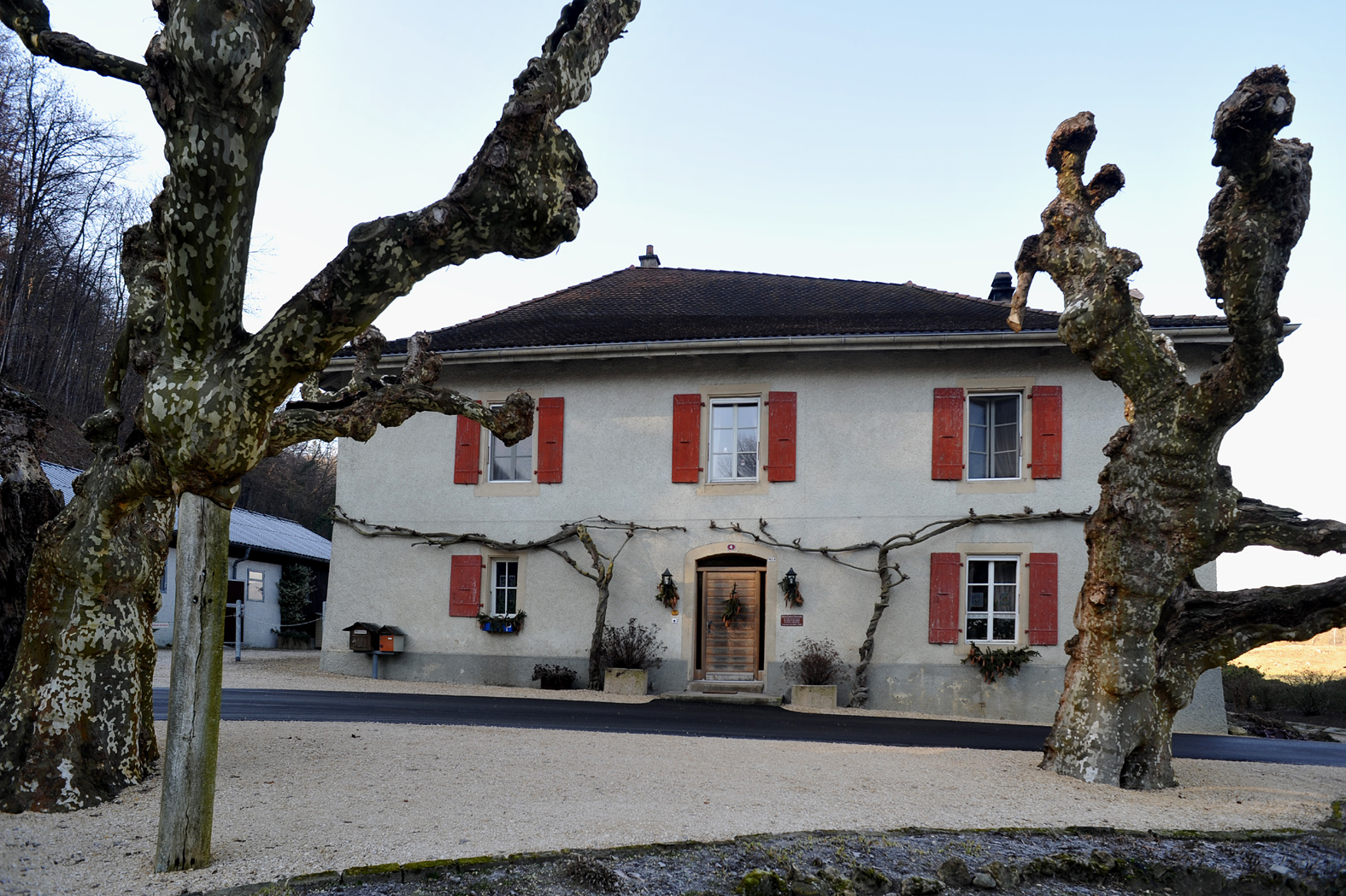
- Canal d'Entreroches port building in Orny village

- Flag Coat of arms
- Location of Orny
- Location within Switzerland Location within Canton of Vaud
- Coordinates: 46°40′N 06°32′E
- Country: Switzerland
- Canton: Vaud
- District: Morges

Government
  - Mayor: Syndic; Martial Messeiller

Area
  - Total: 5.56 km^{2} (2.15 sq mi)
- Elevation: 467 m (1,532 ft)

Population (2003)
  - Total: 312
  - Density: 56.1/km^{2} (145/sq mi)
- Time zone: UTC+01:00 (CET)
  - Summer (DST): UTC+02:00 (CEST)
- Postal code: 1317
- SFOS number: 5493
- ISO 3166 code: CH-VD
- Surrounded by: Bavois, Eclépens, La Sarraz, Pompaples
- Website: www.orny.ch

Orny (French pronunciation: [ɔʁni]) is a municipality in the district of Morges of the canton of Vaud in Switzerland.

== History ==
Orny is first mentioned in 1011 as in Orne.

== Geography ==
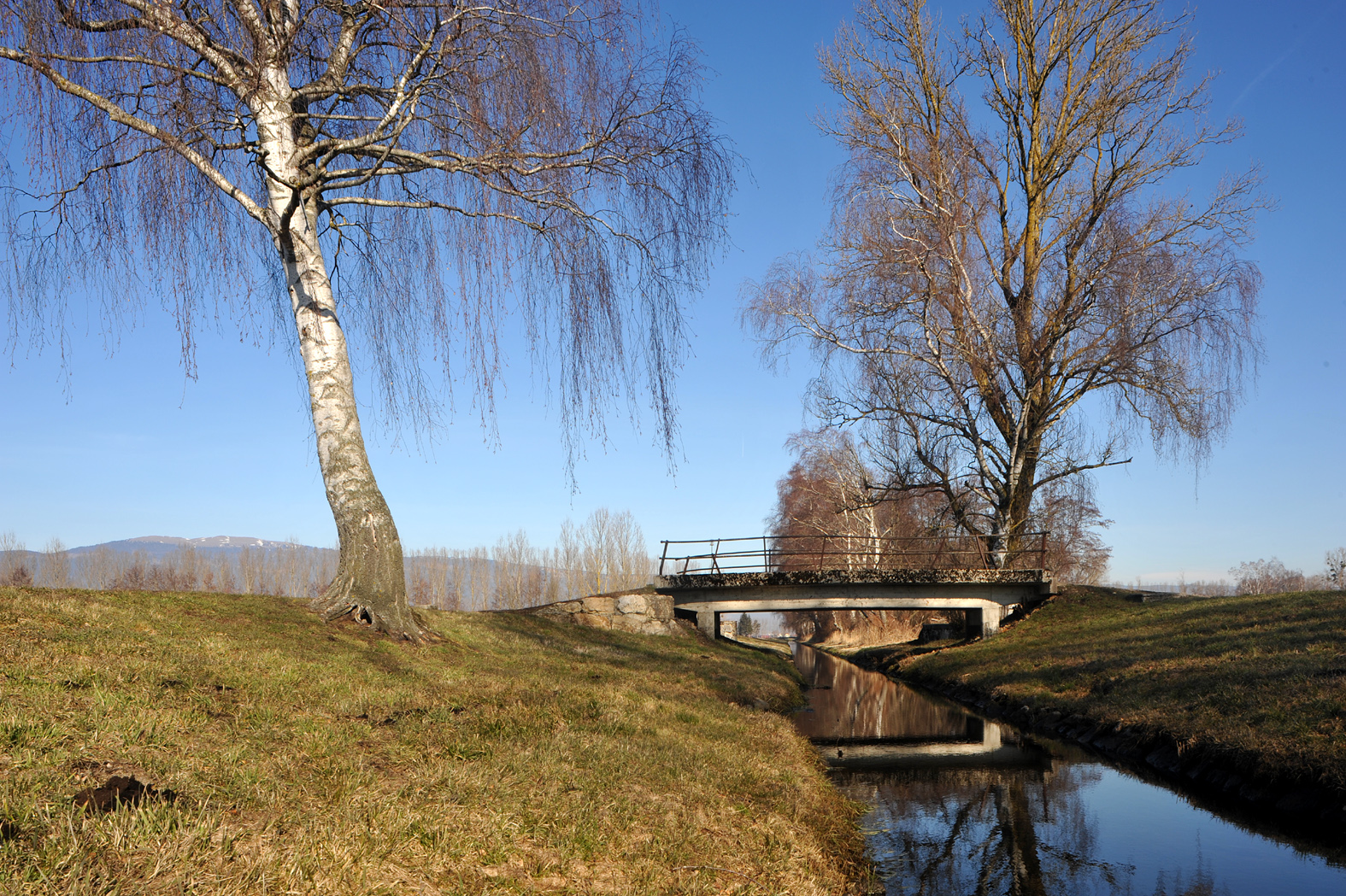
Bridge over the Canal d'Entreroches in Orny

Orny has an area, as of 2009, of 5.56 square kilometers (2.15 sq mi). Of this area, 4.19 km^{2} (1.62 sq mi) or 75.4% is used for agricultural purposes, while 0.89 km^{2} (0.34 sq mi) or 16.0% is forested. Of the rest of the land, 0.38 km^{2} (0.15 sq mi) or 6.8% is settled (buildings or roads), 0.03 km^{2} (7.4 acres) or 0.5% is either rivers or lakes and 0.02 km^{2} (4.9 acres) or 0.4% is unproductive land.

Of the built up area, housing and buildings made up 3.1% and transportation infrastructure made up 2.5%. Power and water infrastructure as well as other special developed areas made up 1.3% of the area Out of the forested land, 14.9% of the total land area is heavily forested and 1.1% is covered with orchards or small clusters of trees. Of the agricultural land, 66.2% is used for growing crops and 8.3% is pastures. All the water in the municipality is flowing water.

The municipality was part of the Cossonay District until it was dissolved on 31 August 2006, and Orny became part of the new district of Morges.

The municipality is located at the entrance of the Nozon valley into the Orbe plains. It consists of the village of Orny and the settlement of Entreroches.

== Coat of arms ==
The blazon of the municipal coat of arms is Pally of Six Argent and Azure, in Chief Gules two Mullets of Five Or, overall a Tower Or roofed and topped with a Cross.

== Demographics ==
Orny has a population (as of December 2020) of 462. As of 2008, 14.2% of the population are resident foreign nationals. Over the last 10 years (1999–2009 ) the population has changed at a rate of 20.4%. It has changed at a rate of 23% due to migration and at a rate of -3.6% due to births and deaths.

Most of the population (as of 2000) speaks French (301 or 90.1%), with German being second most common (13 or 3.9%) and Portuguese being third (11 or 3.3%). There is 1 person who speaks Italian.

Of the population in the municipality 95 or about 28.4% were born in Orny and lived there in 2000. There were 136 or 40.7% who were born in the same canton, while 64 or 19.2% were born somewhere else in Switzerland, and 39 or 11.7% were born outside of Switzerland.

In 2008 there were 2 live births to Swiss citizens and 4 births to non-Swiss citizens, and in same time span there were 10 deaths of Swiss citizens. Ignoring immigration and emigration, the population of Swiss citizens decreased by 8 while the foreign population increased by 4. There was 1 Swiss man who immigrated back to Switzerland. At the same time, there was 1 non-Swiss woman who immigrated from another country to Switzerland. The total Swiss population change in 2008 (from all sources, including moves across municipal borders) was a decrease of 3 and the non-Swiss population increased by 7 people. This represents a population growth rate of 1.1%.

The age distribution, as of 2009, in Orny is; 57 children or 15.3% of the population are between 0 and 9 years old and 47 teenagers or 12.6% are between 10 and 19. Of the adult population, 38 people or 10.2% of the population are between 20 and 29 years old. 61 people or 16.4% are between 30 and 39, 68 people or 18.3% are between 40 and 49, and 41 people or 11.0% are between 50 and 59. The senior population distribution is 30 people or 8.1% of the population are between 60 and 69 years old, 19 people or 5.1% are between 70 and 79, there are 10 people or 2.7% who are between 80 and 89, and there is 1 person who is 90 and older.

As of 2000, there were 144 people who were single and never married in the municipality. There were 150 married individuals, 30 widows or widowers and 10 individuals who are divorced.

As of 2000, there were 110 private households in the municipality, and an average of 2.7 persons per household. There were 23 households that consist of only one person and 14 households with five or more people. Out of a total of 112 households that answered this question, 20.5% were households made up of just one person and there were 2 adults who lived with their parents. Of the rest of the households, there are 29 married couples without children, 49 married couples with children There were 5 single parents with a child or children. There were 2 households that were made up of unrelated people and 2 households that were made up of some sort of institution or another collective housing.

In 2000 there were 48 single family homes (or 60.0% of the total) out of a total of 80 inhabited buildings. There were 14 multi-family buildings (17.5%), along with 16 multi-purpose buildings that were mostly used for housing (20.0%) and 2 other use buildings (commercial or industrial) that also had some housing (2.5%). Of the single family homes 13 were built before 1919, while 18 were built between 1990 and 2000. The most multi-family homes (6) were built before 1919 and the next most (3) were built between 1981 and 1990. There was 1 multi-family house built between 1996 and 2000.

In 2000 there were 122 apartments in the municipality. The most common apartment size was 5 rooms of which there were 32. There were 9 single room apartments and 53 apartments with five or more rooms. Of these apartments, a total of 110 apartments (90.2% of the total) were permanently occupied, while 4 apartments (3.3%) were seasonally occupied and 8 apartments (6.6%) were empty. As of 2009, the construction rate of new housing units was 0 new units per 1000 residents. The vacancy rate for the municipality, in 2010, was 0%.

The historical population is given in the following chart:

== Sights ==
The entire village of Orny is designated as part of the Inventory of Swiss Heritage Sites.

== Politics ==
In the 2007 federal election the most popular party was the SVP which received 23.98% of the vote. The next three most popular parties were the FDP (21.1%), the SP (13.62%) and the CVP (9.65%). In the federal election, a total of 89 votes were cast, and the voter turnout was 38.2%.

== Economy ==
As of 2010, Orny had an unemployment rate of 5.4%. As of 2008, there were 29 people employed in the primary economic sector and about 11 businesses involved in this sector. 9 people were employed in the secondary sector and there were 2 businesses in this sector. 66 people were employed in the tertiary sector, with 8 businesses in this sector. There were 170 residents of the municipality who were employed in some capacity, of which females made up 47.6% of the workforce.

In 2008 the total number of full-time equivalent jobs was 77. The number of jobs in the primary sector was 22, all of which were in agriculture. The number of jobs in the secondary sector was 8, all of which were in construction. The number of jobs in the tertiary sector was 47. In the tertiary sector; 14 or 29.8% were in wholesale or retail sales or the repair of motor vehicles, 1 was in a hotel or restaurant, 2 or 4.3% were technical professionals or scientists, 1 was in education and 27 or 57.4% were in health care.

In 2000, there were 52 workers who commuted into the municipality and 118 workers who commuted away. The municipality is a net exporter of workers, with about 2.3 workers leaving the municipality for every one entering. About 11.5% of the workforce coming into Orny are coming from outside Switzerland. Of the working population, 8.2% used public transportation to get to work, and 61.8% used a private car.

== Religion ==
From the 2000 census, 68 or 20.4% were Roman Catholic, while 202 or 60.5% belonged to the Swiss Reformed Church. Of the rest of the population, there were 2 members of an Orthodox church (or about 0.60% of the population), and there were 14 individuals (or about 4.19% of the population) who belonged to another Christian church. There were 5 (or about 1.50% of the population) who were Islamic. 49 (or about 14.67% of the population) belonged to no church, are agnostic or atheist, and 1 individual (or about 0.30% of the population) did not answer the question.

== Education ==
In Orny about 111 or (33.2%) of the population have completed non-mandatory upper secondary education, and 42 or (12.6%) have completed additional higher education (either university or a Fachhochschule). Of the 42 who completed tertiary schooling, 52.4% were Swiss men, 21.4% were Swiss women, 11.9% were non-Swiss men and 14.3% were non-Swiss women.

In the 2009/2010 school year there were a total of 59 students in the Orny school district. In the Vaud cantonal school system, two years of non-obligatory pre-school are provided by the political districts. During the school year, the political district provided pre-school care for a total of 631 children of which 203 children (32.2%) received subsidized pre-school care. The canton's primary school program requires students to attend for four years. There were 36 students in the municipal primary school program. The obligatory lower secondary school program lasts for six years and there were 23 students in those schools.

As of 2000, there were 2 students in Orny who came from another municipality, while 53 residents attended schools outside the municipality.
