= Breganzona =

Coordinates: 46°0′26″N 8°55′44″E

- Quarter
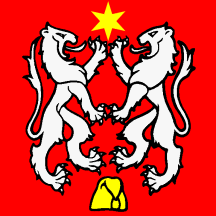
- Flag Coat of arms

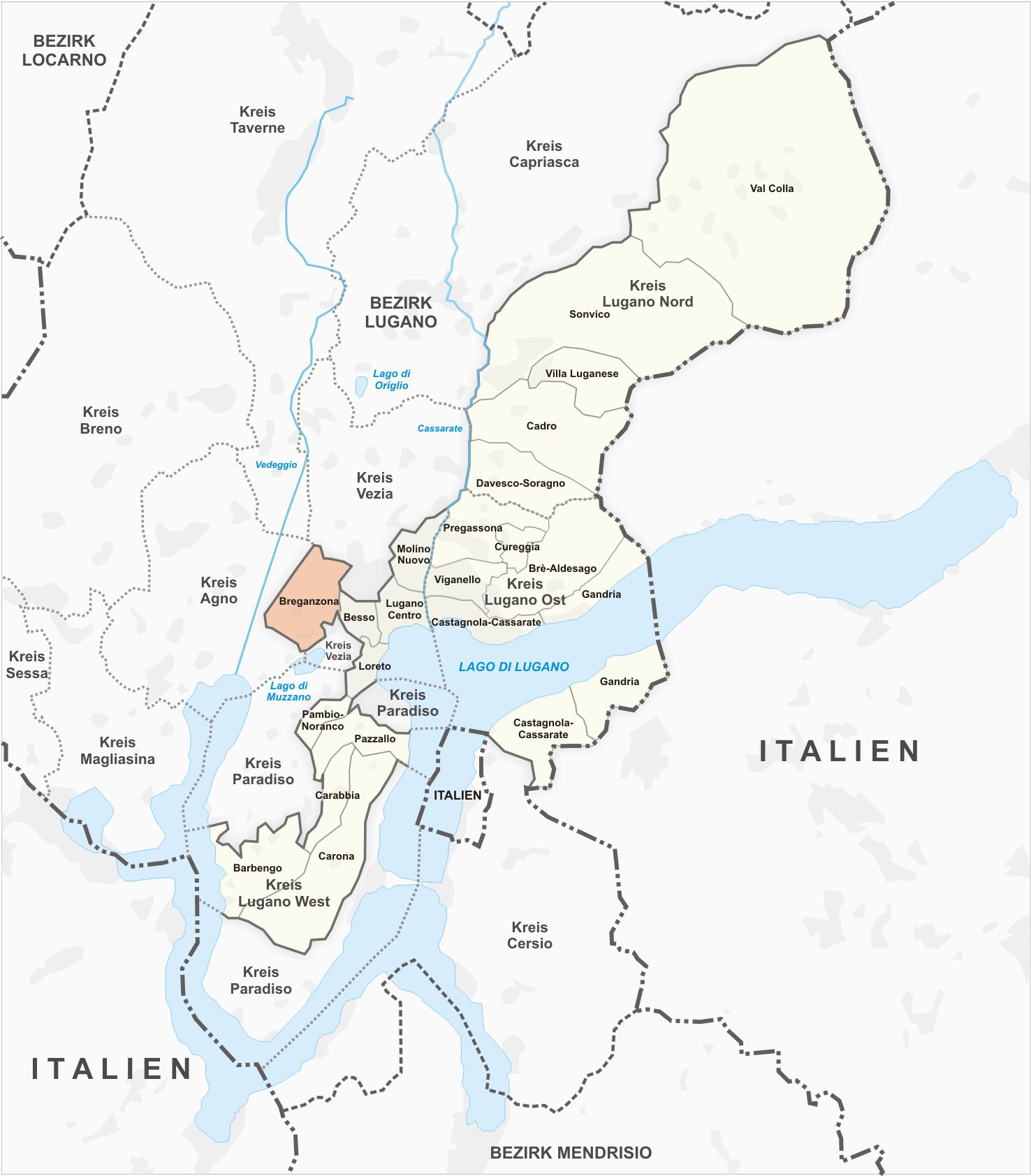
- Country: Switzerland
- Canton: Ticino
- District: Lugano
- City: Lugano

Area
  - Total: 2.3 km^{2} (0.89 sq mi)

Population (2012-12-31)
  - Total: 5,460
  - Density: 2,400/km^{2} (6,100/sq mi)

Breganzona is a quarter of the city of Lugano, Switzerland. Breganzona was formerly a municipality of its own, having been incorporated into Lugano in 2004. It was first recorded in 984 as Brianzona. The municipality had 232 inhabitants in 1850, which increased to 369 in 1900, 883 in 1950, 4,654 in 1990 and 4,782 in 2000.

== Biogno ==
In 1925 the municipality of Biogno was split into two parts and assigned to Breganzona and Bioggio.

== Bibliography ==
- Nicola Pfund, Breganzona: echi dalla collina di ponente, Fontana Edizioni, 2005.
