= Mutten =

- Former municipality
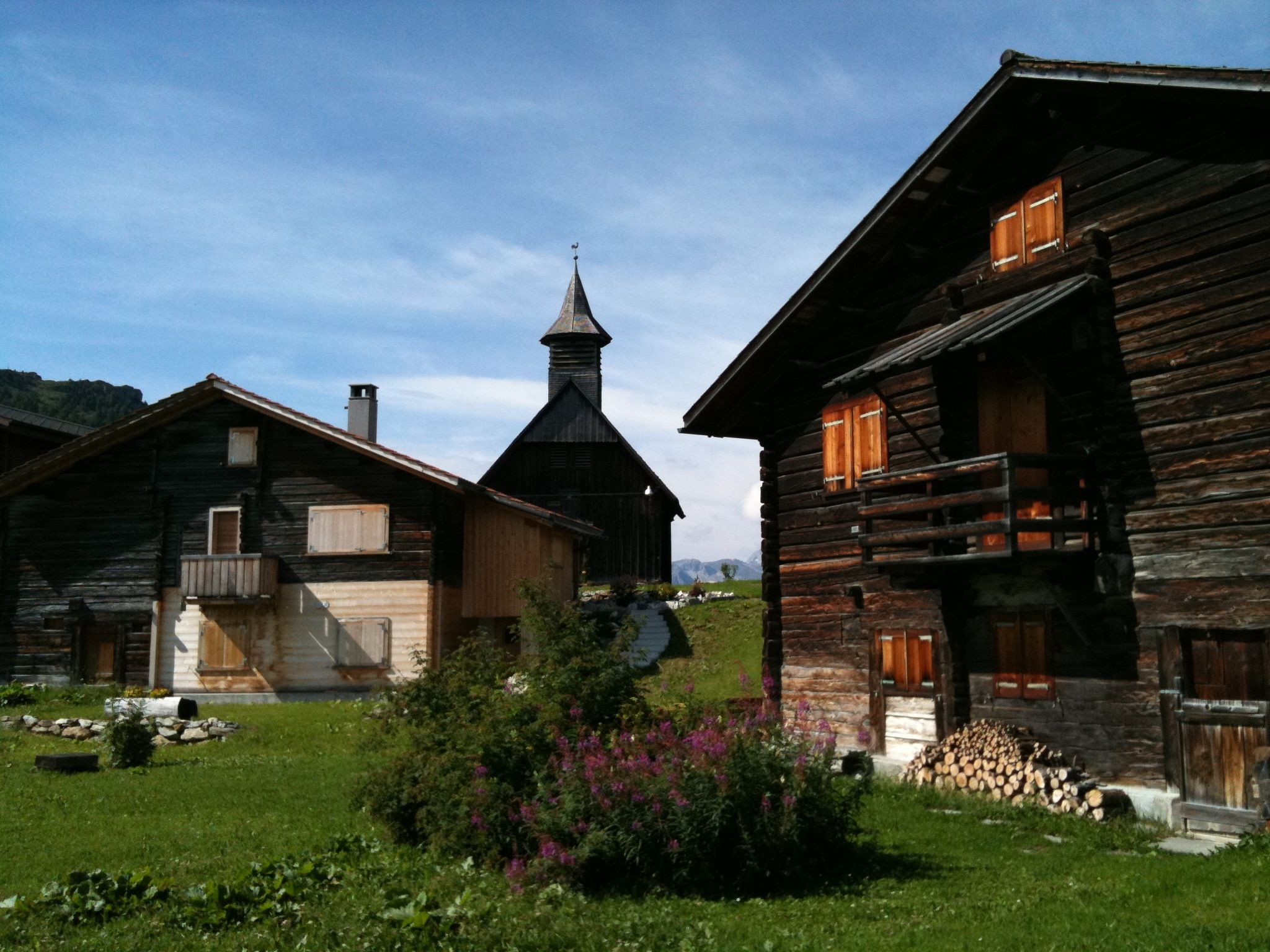

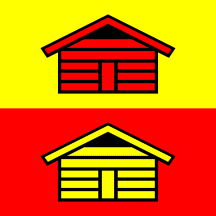
- Flag Coat of arms
- Location of Mutten
- Location within Switzerland Location within Canton of Graubünden
- Coordinates: 46°40′N 9°30′E
- Country: Switzerland
- Canton: Graubünden
- District: Viamala

Area
  - Total: 9.91 km^{2} (3.83 sq mi)
- Elevation: 1,395 m (4,577 ft)

Population (December 2015)
  - Total: 72
  - Density: 7.3/km^{2} (19/sq mi)
- Time zone: UTC+01:00 (CET)
  - Summer (DST): UTC+02:00 (CEST)
- Postal code: 7431
- SFOS number: 3503
- ISO 3166 code: CH-GR
- Surrounded by: Sils im Domleschg, Stierva, Vaz/Obervaz, Zillis-Reischen
- Twin towns: Riehen (Switzerland)
- Website: www.mutten.ch

Mutten (Romansh: Mut) is a former municipality in the Viamala Region in the canton of Graubünden in Switzerland. On 1 January 2018 the former municipality of Mutten merged into the municipality of Thusis.

== History ==
Mutten is first mentioned in 1363 as unz uff die Mutten though this identification is debated. In 1549 it was mentioned as Hans ab Mutten.

== Geography ==
Aerial view from 300 m by Walter Mittelholzer (1923)

Before the merger, Mutten had an area, as of 2006, of 9.9 km^{2} (3.8 sq mi). Of this area, 29.5% is used for agricultural purposes, while 60.5% is forested. Of the rest of the land, 1.2% is settled (buildings or roads) and the remainder (8.8%) is non-productive (rivers, glaciers or mountains).

Before 2017, the municipality was located in the Alvaschein sub-district of the Albula district, after 2017 it was part of the Viamala Region. It is a three level settlement located to the south of the Schin Gorge (Schinschlucht). It consists of the village of Unter-Mutten (occupied year round and at an elevation of 1,394 m (4,573 ft)), the middle village of Stafel (1,761 m (5,778 ft)) and the upper or Ober-Mutten (1,860 m (6,100 ft)).

== Demographics ==
Mutten had a population (as of 2015) of 72. As of 2008, 2.4% of the population was made up of foreign nationals. Over the last 10 years the population has decreased at a rate of -6.8%. Most of the population (as of 2000) speaks German (98.8%), with a small Romansh minority (1.3%).

As of 2000, the gender distribution of the population was 57.3% male and 42.7% female. The age distribution, as of 2000, in Mutten is; 9 people or 11.3% of the population are between 0 and 9 years old. 5 people or 6.3% are 10 to 14, and 6 people or 7.5% are 15 to 19. Of the adult population, 2 people or 2.5% of the population are between 20 and 29 years old. 7 people or 8.8% are 30 to 39, 13 people or 16.3% are 40 to 49, and 15 people or 18.8% are 50 to 59. The senior population distribution is 6 people or 7.5% of the population are between 60 and 69 years old, 11 people or 13.8% are 70 to 79, there are 5 people or 6.3% who are 80 to 89, and there is 1 person or 1.3% who are 90 to 99.

In the 2007 federal election the most popular party was the SVP which received 67.1% of the vote. The next three most popular parties were the SPS (15.7%), the CVP (9.3%) and the FDP (7.9%).

In Mutten about 66.7% of the population (between age 25–64) have completed either non-mandatory upper secondary education or additional higher education (either university or a Fachhochschule).

Mutten has an unemployment rate of 0%. As of 2005, there were 20 people employed in the primary economic sector and about 10 businesses involved in this sector. people are employed in the secondary sector and there are businesses in this sector. 4 people are employed in the tertiary sector, with 2 businesses in this sector.

The historical population is given in the following table:

year	population
1803	98
1850	132
1900	193
1910	99
1950	125
2000	80
