= Valle Vigezzo =

Valley in Italy

Coordinates: 46.1333°N 8.55°E

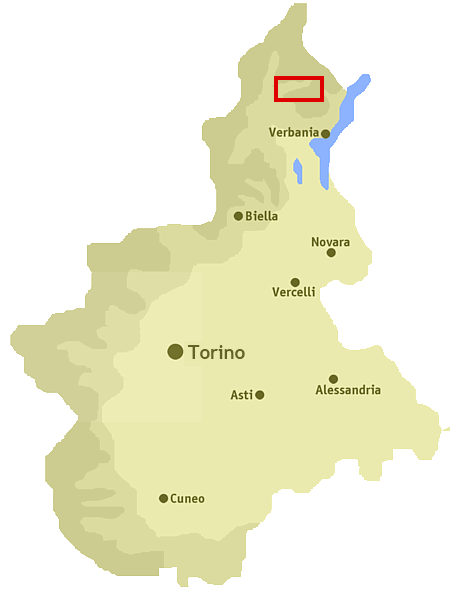
Location of Val Vigezzo in Piedmont, northern Italy.

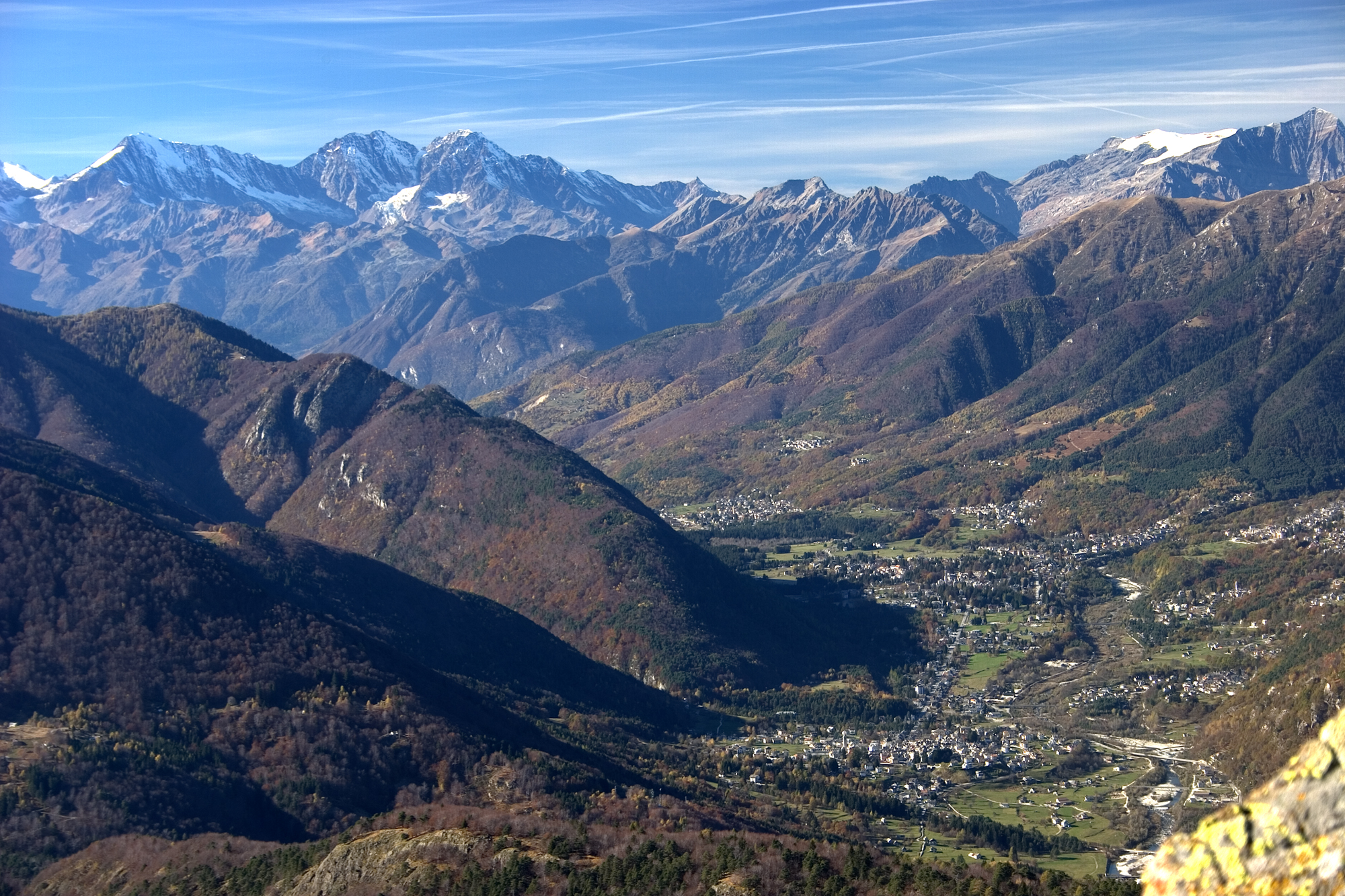
The valley seen from Monte Torriggia.

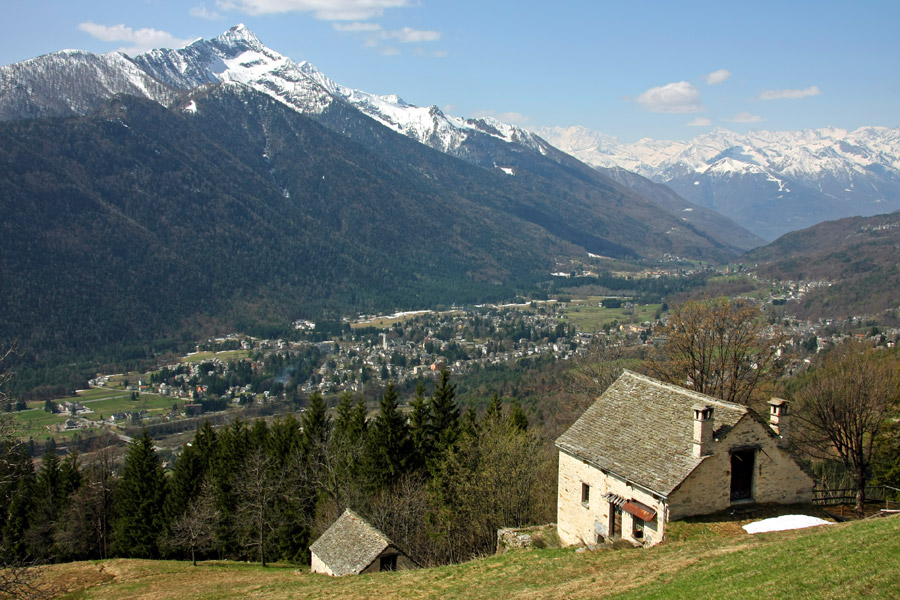
Panorama of the valley from Craveggia.

Valle Vigezzo (Vigezzo Valley; Lombard: Val Vigezz) is a valley in the Lepontine Alps in northwestern Italy on the border with Canton Ticino of Switzerland. It forms the eastern branch of the Ossola valley. It is also called the Valle dei Pittori (Valley of the Painters) due to the large number of painters over the centuries such as Giuseppe Mattia Borgnis, Lorenzo Peretti, Bernardino Peretti, Enrico Cavalli, Carlo Fornara, Giovanni Battista Ciolina, Gian Maria Rastellini, Maurizio Borgnis, Lorenzo Peretti Junior. It is remembered for its "spazzacamini" or chimney-sweepers who brought their trade around Europe. It is connected with the Eau de Cologne, invented over 300 years ago by Giovanni Maria Farina using, among other ingredients flowers and oils from plants from Vigezzo. Another man from Vigezzo, Giovan Maria Salati is credited to be the first recorded person swimming across the English Channel over 200 years ago, after having been taken prisoner by the British after Waterloo.

The valley itself is unusual for not having a single river running along it, but two, one towards the Toce river (Melezzo Occidentale) and the other (Melezzo Orientale) to the Swiss side towards Lake Maggiore. The Swiss side of the valley is called Centovalli.

== Inhabited centers ==
In the valley there are many beautiful villages: Druogno, Santa Maria Maggiore, Malesco and Re at the valley floor; Toceno, Craveggia and Villette on the slopes.

== Main peaks ==
- Pizzo La Scheggia (2466 m)
- Pioda di Crana (2430 m)
- Pizzo Ragno (2289 m)
- Cima della Laurasca (2193 m)
- Monte Gridone (2167 m)
