= Pedrazzini =

Pedrazzini is an Italian surname. Notable people with the surname include:

- Members of the Pedrazzini family from Campo (Vellemaggia), a wealthy family of Swiss merchants attested since the 17th century
  - Giovanni Battista Pedrazzini (1673–1749)
  - Maria Apollonia Pedrazzini (1693–1766)
  - Michele Pedrazzini (1712–1763)
  - Guglielmo Maria Pedrazzini (1733–1801)
- Giuseppe Pedrazzini (1879–1957), Italian luthier
- Luigi Pedrazzini (footballer) (1909–?), Italian footballer
- Massimo Pedrazzini (born 1958), Italian footballer and manager
- Mauro Pedrazzini (born 1965), Liechtenstein politician
