= Melezzo Orientale =

River in Italy and Switzerland

Melezza
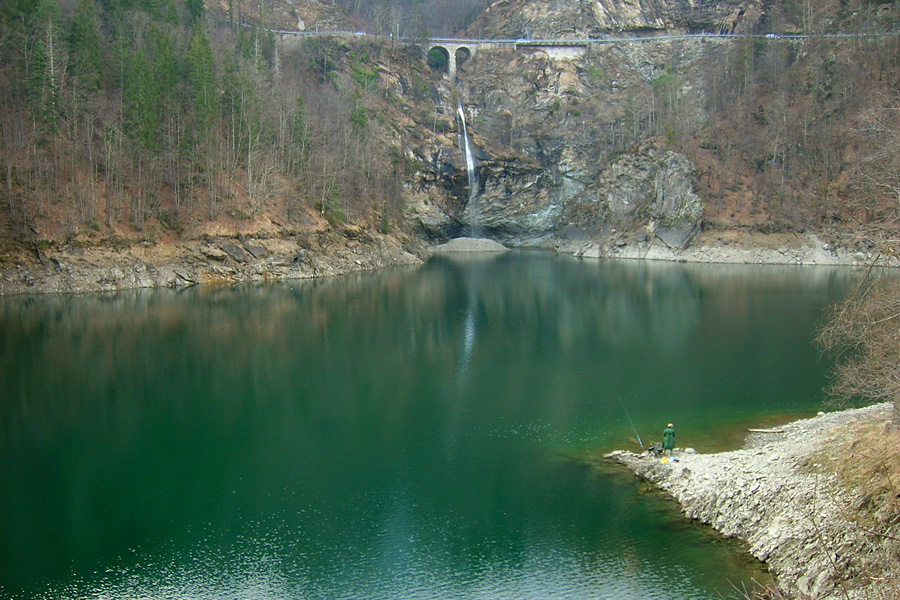
- The river is dammed to form an artificial lake at Palagnedra.

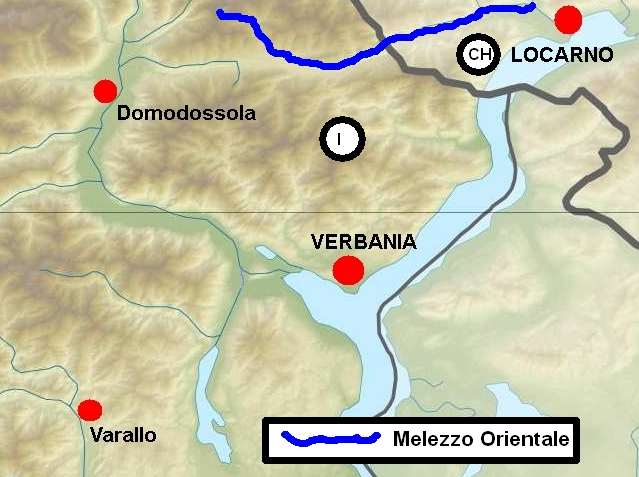
- Location of the stream

Location
- Country: Switzerland, Italy

Physical characteristics
- Source: Pioda di Crana (Italy)
  - elevation: 2,430 m (7,970 ft)
- Mouth: Maggia
  - location: Losone (Switzerland)
  - coordinates: 46°10′49″N 8°45′26″E
- Length: 42 km (26 mi)
- Discharge
  - average: 5 m^{3}/s (180 cu ft/s)

Basin features
- Progression: Maggia→ Lake Maggiore→ Ticino→ Po→ Adriatic Sea
- Tributaries
  - left: Isorno

The Melezza, in Italy the Melezzo Orientale, is a 42 km Alpine torrent which runs through the eastern part of the Val Vigezzo, in the Province of Verbano Cusio Ossola, northern Italy; and through the Centovalli of Canton Ticino, Switzerland. Belonging to the Po basin, it is a tributary of the Maggia which in its turn flows into Lago Maggiore.

The springs are on the eastern slopes of Pioda di Crana. To begin with the river runs south forming the deep valley of Arvogno (a locality within the commune of Toceno); near Santa Maria Maggiore (VB) the course turns east and takes it through the gentler slopes of the high plain which forms the central section of the Val Vigezzo; at Malesco it is joined by the Loana.

Having passed through Re the valley narrows and the torrent begins to run through restricted gorges, entering in this manner Swiss territory, where it is known simply as the Melezza. Its course then runs through the Centovalli and the municipalities of Borgnone, Palagnedra and Intragna. Having been joined by its most important tributary, the Isorno, it flows into the Maggia at Losone, just before the Maggia enters Lago Maggiore.

A little after the Italian-Swiss border, near Palagnedra, a dam was built across the river in the years 1951–52 to create the Lago di Palagnedra, a reservoir which provides hydropower.

== See also ==
- Melezzo Occidentale, a tributary of the Toce.
- List of rivers of Switzerland
