= Giuseppe Mattia Borgnis =

Italian painter

Giuseppe Mattia Borgnis (1701–1761) was an Italian painter and architect.

== Biography ==
Born to a family of limited means, he apprenticed in Craveggia, his birthplace, with a painter, from about 1710 to 1716. He was then sent to Bologna, then Venice, where he was strongly influenced by the painters Giuseppe Maria Crespi and Giovanni Battista Piazzetta. By the age of 19 he had returned to Craveggia. By the age of 25 he had joined the studio of Andrea Dell'Angelo. Among Borgnis' pupils was Giuliano Da Parma and two of his sons, Giovanni (born 1728) and Pietro Maria (born 1743).

He was known for painting local sacred subjects including Villette, Baceno, Vocogno, Trontano, Crana, Smeglio, (Mozzio) Coimo, Viganella, Montecrestese, Varzo, Trasquera, Bugliaga, Cattagna, Domodossola, Antrona Schieranco, Vocogno, Cimalmotto, Trontano, Simplon, Campo Valmaggia, Cevio Valmaggia, Prestinone, and Druogno. From 1752 to 1755 he searched for work in Paris and London. Soon after, on 12 October 1761, he died in London of causes unknown. It is thought that he perhaps died of a fall from a scaffold. His children traveled to England to complete some of his works.

His masterpieces include frescoes and canvases (1723–1727) done for the parish church of Santa Maria Maggiore. He also painted for the Oratory of Gabbio in Malesco and the Oratory of the Madonna del Sasso di Orasso. He painted in the parish church of Campo di Valle Maggia (1748). In England, he painted ceilings and other interior decor for the country house of Sir Francis Dashwood at West Wycombe Park, near London.
