= Guglielmo Maria Pedrazzini =

18th-century merchant and politician

- Born: 2 September 1733; Campo, Vallemaggia, Old Swiss Confederacy
- Died: 17 March 1801 (aged 67); Campo, Vallemaggia
- Occupations: Merchant, politician
- Spouse: Marta Maria Pedrazzini
- Children: 15 (5 survived to adulthood)
- Parent(s): Giovanni Battista Pedrazzini; Giacomina Pontoni

Guglielmo Maria Pedrazzini (2 September 1733 – 17 March 1801) was a Swiss merchant and politician active in the family business in Kassel and representative of the Vallemaggia community.

== Early life and family ==
Guglielmo Maria Pedrazzini was the eldest of six children born to Giovanni Battista Pedrazzini, a merchant, and Giacomina Pontoni in Campo, Vallemaggia.

In 1759, he married his cousin Marta Maria Pedrazzini, daughter and heiress of Michele Pedrazzini and Giovanna Fantina. This marriage preceded that of his younger brother Michele Maria Pedrazzini to his wife's sister, Maria Apollonia Pedrazzini; the two branches thus united by alliance perpetuated the family lineage. Of Guglielmo Maria's 15 children, only five reached adulthood, a loss that deeply affected him.

== Career ==
As heir to the merchant family of Campo, Pedrazzini completed his apprenticeship in his uncle Carlo Antonio Fantina's business in Heidelberg, before joining the colonial goods store Gaspard Pedrazzini & Fils in Kassel. Between the late 1740s and early 1770s, Guglielmo Maria Pedrazzini worked at this shop on several occasions, decisively influencing its management. He drafted its 1765 regulations and continued to oversee its activities even after his return to Vallemaggia. His dedication to running the business is documented in three volumes of his letter-copybook in which he meticulously transcribed the contents of letters sent to various recipients between 1772 and 1795, representing an extraordinarily rich historical source.

Pedrazzini initiated his children into commerce, personally organizing their education. After receiving elementary training from priests in Vallemaggia and studying at the Papio College in Ascona, his father placed them as apprentices in Ansbach, Bavaria, with their uncle Gaspare Lamberti, husband of Giovanna Maria, Guglielmo Maria's younger sister. They then joined the Kassel store. During the absence of Lamberti and several other compatriots due to emigration, Guglielmo Maria Pedrazzini took care of managing their property and protecting their rights in the valley.

== Political career ==
As an important figure in the family and local community, Pedrazzini represented the vicinanza (local community) of Campo on numerous occasions and at different levels, defending its interests before the bailiff and Swiss authorities. In 1775, he was appointed captain of Vallemaggia and Val Lavizzara, a title that testified to the reputation he enjoyed in the bailiwick and beyond.

== See also ==
- Pedrazzini family

== Bibliography ==
- Mondada, Giuseppe: Commerci e commercianti di Campo Valmaggia nel Settecento. Dalle lettere dei Pedrazzini e di altri conterranei attivi in Germania e in Italia, 1977.
- Chiesi Ermotti, Francesca: Le Alpi in movimento. Vicende del casato dei mercanti Pedrazzini di Campo Vallemaggia (XVIII s.), 2019.
