= Lorenzo Peretti Junior =

Italian painter

- Born: Lorenzo Peretti; 10 November 1871; Buttogno
- Died: 30 June 1953 (aged 81); Toceno
- Education: School of Fine Arts "Rossetti Valentini"
- Known for: Painting
- Movement: Divisionism, Post-Impressionism

Lorenzo Peretti (10 November 1871 – 30 June 1953) was an Italian divisionist and postimpressionist painter.

== Biography ==
Son of the distinguished local painter Bernardino Peretti, grandson and namesake of a celebrated creator of frescoes, Lorenzo Peretti Junior was the last descendant of a gifted dynasty of Valle Vigezzo artists: the Perettis of Buttogno. His artistic inclinations and talent for drawing were evident in his youth, however his father compelled him to study commerce; he went to boarding school in Bern and later worked in Milan for a brief period. In 1889, when his father died leaving him a substantial inheritance, he decided to dedicate himself entirely to painting. He enrolled the following year at the Rossetti Valentini School of Fine Arts in Santa Maria Maggiore, where he took courses in painting, drawing and ornamentation taught by Enrico Cavalli. During these years of study, he became close friends with Carlo Fornara, who had enrolled at the school in 1883. Enrico Cavalli transmitted to his students the aesthetic and emotional values of Impressionism, to which the youthful Lorenzo responded in a very personally inflected way that won the sympathy of his teacher.

When Enrico Cavalli gave up his teaching position at the Rossetti Valentini School, his best students were given the opportunity to widen their horizons and immerse themselves in French culture. In 1892, Peretti, together with Fornara and Giovanni Battista Ciolina (another of Cavalli's former students), made plans to accompany the master to Provence, Lyon and Paris. In the end they set out on the journey in 1893 without Ciolina, who would travel to France only in 1896, with Fornara. Peretti was finally able to see for himself the solutions engendered by the research of the masters Cavalli had constantly invoked during the ten years he taught in Santa Maria Maggiore. In Lyon, Peretti explored the painting of Eugène Delacroix; in Paris he discovered the Pointillism of Georges Seurat and Paul Signac, whose painting of light led him to Divisionism without the mediation of Giovanni Segantini, Plinio Nomellini or Angelo Morbelli. A second journey, in 1894, led Peretti to deepen his study of the work of Adolphe Monticelli, already cited at the time by Vincent van Gogh and Paul Cézanne. Although Peretti had already been noticed by the tight and clearly defined circle of the Italian Divisionists (Morbelli mentions him several times, at first in admiring tones, later with a certain pique, in a series of letters addressed to Giuseppe Pellizza da Volpedo), Peretti chose not to align himself totally with the movement, in particular with a group whose schematic, scientific approach he judged to be too strict and too restrictive.

Peretti then moved away from Divisionism and set out along a solitary pathway, a personal synthesis of research, a scientific approach and mathematical rules with the spontaneity of the gesture, the immediacy of the sign and the emotional and sensory values inherited from Cavalli: a rejection which definitively excluded him from the avant-garde movements and the attention of contemporary criticism. The artist now privileged the technique of the "non finito", the unfinished – already apparent in earlier paintings like Lavandaie alla lanca di Toceno (Washerwomen at the oxbow lake near Toceno, 1894) – where masked or flattened colour, superimposed signs and a variety of techniques are made to coexist within a single work with the aim of involving, provoking and embarrassing a hypothetical public. The paintings Conversazione campestre (Conversation in the Fields) and Il bosco dei druidi (The Woods of the Druids) also date from this period. The latter work expresses Peretti's lively interest in esotericism: a follower of René Guénon, a passionate reader of Rudolf Steiner and Allan Kardec, of Eliphas Levi, and of Buddhist and yoga texts, the artist and scholar created a large library of esoteric and theosophical works together with his friend Adolfo Papetti, a collector and the executor of his will.

An increasingly solitary and eccentric figure, often mystified by the diffidence of his fellow townspeople (who believed he knew the secrets of the archaic sorcery of the Valley) and the superficiality of the criticism of his work, Peretti spent the last decades of his life living in seclusion at Toceno, devoting himself mostly to studying and critiquing art. An analytical, in-depth reassessment of his role in the art of Valle Vigezzo and Italy generally at the turn of the 20th century would not be carried out until the 1990s, with the research of the Piedmontese critic Dario Gnemmi, in particular the volumes Retour à la ferme (Return to the farm; 1993) and the posthumous Vigezzini di Francia. Pittura d'alpe e d'Oltralpe tra Otto e Novecento in Valle Vigezzo (The French Vigezzini. Painting in Valle Vigezzo of the Alps and beyond at the turn of the 20th century; 2007).

== Exhibitions ==
- "Una scuola di pittura in Val Vigezzo: 1881-1919": Turin/Novara, 1990
- "Paesaggi dell'Ottocento. Verso la luce": Riva del Garda, 2010
- "Le soglie della natura": Arco di Trento, 2010
- "Genius Loci. I Capolavori del Museo del Paesaggio a Villa Giulia": Pallanza, 2014
- "Alessandro Poscio, collezionista appassionato": Domodossola, 2014
- "Carlo Fornara e il ritratto vigezzino": Domodossola, 2015
- "Tra Guercino e De Nittis": Domodossola, 2017

== Literature ==
- Thieme-Becker: "Allgemeines Lexikon der Bildenden Künstler von der Antike bis zur Gegenwart", Seemann, Leipzig, 1907-1950
- Tullio Bertamini: "Lorenzo Peretti pittore", n. 4 "Oscellana" magazine, Domodossola, 1974
- Guido Cesura: "Il pittore Lorenzo Peretti Junior", n. 2 "Oscellana" magazine, Domodossola, 1979
- Dario Gnemmi: "Lorenzo Peretti Junior (1871-1953). Un innovatore della ricerca pittorica tra irrazionalismo formale e risoluzioni scientifiche", Bollettino storico per la provincia di Novara, n. 1, 1995
- Davide Brullo: "In suprema identità. Invocazione metafisica di Lorenzo Peretti Junior", Madame Webb, Domodossola, 2011

== Additional literature ==
- Auctores varii: "Carlo Fornara nel centenario della sua nascita", n. 3 "Oscellana" magazine, Domodossola, 1971
- Guido Cesura: "Enrico Cavalli e la pittura vigezzina", Colombi, Milan, 1974
- Davide Ramoni: "Scuola di belle arti Rossetti Valentini in Santa Maria Maggiore. Vicende e contributi alla pittura vigezzina nel centenario della fondazione", tip. S. Gaudenzio, Novara, 1978
- Dario Gnemmi: "Una scuola di pittura in Val Vigezzo: 1881-1919. Carlo Giuseppe ed Enrico Cavalli, Giovanni Battista Ciolina, Carlo Fornara", Il Quadrante, Turin, 1990
- Guido Cesura: "Enrico Cavalli pittore", Grossi, Domodossola, 1993
- Dario Gnemmi: "Retour à la ferme", Biglia Club, Domodossola, 1993
- Francesco Ferrari: "La scuola di belle arti Rossetti Valentini in Santa Maria Maggiore", Grossi, Domodossola, 1999
- Dario Gnemmi: "Monticelli e la scuola di Enrico Cavalli", Madame Webb, Domodossola, 2006
- Dario Gnemmi: "Vigezzini di Francia. Pittura d'alpe e d'Oltralpe tra Otto e Novecento in Valle Vigezzo", Skira, Milan, 2007
- Giovanna Nicoletti: "Paesaggi dell'Ottocento. Verso la luce", Temi, Trento, 2009
- Giovanna Nicoletti/Dario Gnemmi: "Le soglie della natura", Grafica 5, Arco di Trento, 2010
- Davide Brullo: "Appassionata incompetenza. I primi cinquant'anni della collezione Poscio", Madame Webb, Domodossola, 2011
