= Giovanni Battista Pedrazzini =

Swiss merchant (1673–1749)

- Born: 15 January 1673; Campo, Vallemaggia, Old Swiss Confederacy
- Died: 15 November 1749 (aged 76); Campo, Vallemaggia
- Occupation: Merchant
- Spouse: Marta Camani (m. 1701)
- Children: 10, including Michele Pedrazzini
- Parent(s): Gaspare Pedrazzini; Giacomina Fantina
- Relatives: Guglielmo Pedrazzini (brother)

Giovanni Battista Pedrazzini (15 January 1673 – 15 November 1749) was a Swiss merchant active in the family business in Kassel, Germany. He was a prominent member of the Pedrazzini family, which played a significant role in colonial goods trade during the 18th century.

== Early life and family ==
Giovanni Battista Pedrazzini was born on 15 January 1673 in Campo, Vallemaggia, the second of ten children of merchant Gaspare Pedrazzini and Giacomina Fantina. In 1701, he married Marta Camani, daughter of merchant Gaspare Camani. On the same day, his younger brother Guglielmo Pedrazzini married Anna Camani, Marta's younger sister. Giovanni Battista and Marta had ten children, including Michele Pedrazzini, who continued his father's activities in commerce and patronage.

== Career ==
Giovanni Battista Pedrazzini was initiated into the merchant trade by his father, who founded the colonial goods store Gaspard Pedrazzini & Fils in Kassel at the beginning of the 18th century. He took his first steps in the family business, laying the foundations for a solid career as a merchant that continued into the 1730s alongside his brother Guglielmo. In the 1727 division of assets, Gaspare Pedrazzini transferred the German store and properties located in Campo to Giovanni Battista and Guglielmo, while assigning other properties, including lands in Sottoceneri, to his eldest son Giovanni and his youngest son Michele.

== Later life and patronage ==
Giovanni Battista Pedrazzini lived with his son Michele's family in an imposing residence that he had built in Campo in 1737, which was connected to his brother Guglielmo's house. In 1749, he had an oratory built in front of his house dedicated to Saint John the Baptist, over which he held patronage rights and which he endowed with a considerable annuity for the officiating canon. His son Giovanni Antonio Pedrazzini, who became a priest, was the first to hold this position in the family church.

The scale of credits distributed among Giovanni Battista Pedrazzini's heirs testifies to a great fortune, which had further increased through judicious investments with institutions and individuals, particularly from Vallemaggia. At his death in 1749, the Franciscan Cordeliers of Fritzlar celebrated requiem masses and composed a eulogy in his honor, which was printed near Göttingen. Giovanni Battista Pedrazzini left a lasting mark on the history of his family and his business.

== Bibliography ==
- Mondada, Giuseppe: Commerci e commercianti di Campo Valmaggia nel Settecento. Dalle lettere dei Pedrazzini e di altri conterranei attivi in Germania e in Italia, 1977.
- Pedrazzini, Mario M. (ed.): L'Oratorio di San Giovanni Battista a Campo Vallemaggia. Storia e restauro, 2004.
- Chiesi Ermotti, Francesca: Le Alpi in movimento. Vicende del casato dei mercanti Pedrazzini di Campo Vallemaggia (XVIII s.), 2019.
