= Melezzo =

Melezzo is the name of two Alpine rivers:

- The Melezzo Orientale (known in the Swiss part of its course as the Melezza), a tributary of the Maggia which flows eastwards through the Val Vigezzo in Italy and the Centovalli in Switzerland
- The Melezzo Occidentale, a tributary of the Toce which flows westwards through the Italian Val Vigezzo.
