= Pedrazzini family =

Swiss merchant family from Campo, Vallemaggia

Pedrazzini
- Place of origin: Campo (Vallemaggia), Switzerland
- Founded: 17th century
- Members: Gaspare Pedrazzini, Giovanni Battista Pedrazzini, Guglielmo Pedrazzini, Maria Apollonia Pedrazzini, Martino Pedrazzini, Giovan Battista Pedrazzini
- Distinctions: Merchants, politicians, landowners

The Pedrazzini are a Swiss family originally from Campo in the Vallemaggia, attested since the 17th century. Family members were notably active as merchants in Kassel and as politicians in the bailiwicks of Vallemaggia and Locarno.

== History ==
=== Origins ===
The rare information about the origins of the Pedrazzini family from Campo belongs more to legend than to historical narrative. The studied lineage established itself permanently in the highest commune of the Campo valley, in the upper Vallemaggia, at least from the mid-17th century. Gaspare Pedrazzini (1643-1724), a merchant, left his alpine village at the end of the 17th century to travel to the territories of the Holy Roman Empire. He thus followed the path traced by other emigrants who left the common bailiwicks and Lombardy to reach centers located north of the Alps.

=== Commercial activities ===
Initially associated with the merchant-bankers Guaita from Menaggio, established in Paderborn and Frankfurt am Main, he subsequently directed his own colonial goods store, founded in Kassel at the beginning of the 18th century under the name of Gaspard Pedrazzini & Fils. After him, his sons Giovanni Battista and Guglielmo Pedrazzini (1675-1744) and their numerous male descendants took turns at the head of the family business, making frequent round trips between the Landgraviate of Hesse and their native village, until the closure of the business in the 1830s following a series of unfortunate events, including family disputes, political upheavals, and economic crises.

For more than a century, the enterprise remained firmly in the hands of the owning family, who relied on a few related directors and on a workforce originating from Vallemaggia. Through the intermediary of the Guaita, the Pedrazzini obtained overseas merchandise from North Sea ports (spices, coffee, chocolate) or products purchased in Italian centers (cheese, olives, lemons). Their activity was closely linked to that of compatriots who owned shops in Rhenish cities, such as the Fantina in Heidelberg, the Sartori in Mannheim, or the Tosetti in Mainz.

During their travels from Vallemaggia to Kassel, the Pedrazzini benefited from the hospitality of other merchants originally from Campo with whom they maintained intense exchanges, sealed by matrimonial alliances that consolidated relations within the commercial bourgeoisie of the village. These links were further reinforced by the circulation of labor between enterprises and by the commercial apprenticeship carried out in different branches by future heirs. Trained in their native country in schools run by canons and colleges managed by religious orders, they completed their education abroad by learning languages, writing, arithmetic, and accounting.

=== Social elevation and wealth ===
The Pedrazzini's activities as entrepreneurs were crowned with success, which allowed them to rise to the rank of notables in the common bailiwicks and to assert themselves in their commune of origin. This commercial success was at the origin of the imposing complex of manor houses in Campo, which they had built contiguously around the family oratory dedicated to John the Baptist. These constructions testify to the family's power and their role as patrons. In the elegant interiors of these residences, where maidservants and household helpers worked, there was exotic furniture and precious objects purchased by the Pedrazzini where they had emigrated; this refined décor legitimized their aspirations for social elevation.

Through the wealth acquired by commerce, they increased a landed patrimony composed of possessions (agricultural land, pastures, vineyards, forests) located in an area that covered the bailiwicks of Vallemaggia and Locarno and that extended from the alpine pastures of Campo, where they held grazing rights for their herds, to the slopes of Gambarogno. It was also in this territory that the Pedrazzini's credit network developed, lending capital to individuals and public collectivities. The important sums of money lent, on which they collected interest from individual debtors and especially from communes that presented good guarantees of solvency, drew a dense network of clientelism.

=== Political and social influence ===
The capital investments and acquisition choices of the Pedrazzini who renounced emigration to concentrate on their land of origin testify to a will to lay the foundations of their power in their native region. They played a leading role both as privileged interlocutors of Confederate delegates and officials, before whom they were called to represent communities and individuals, and as protectors of churches and confraternities, patrons and benefactors. Among other generous donors of the family, the widow Maria Apollonia Pedrazzini particularly distinguished herself in this last activity.

In the context of an eminently masculine emigration, the female figures of the Pedrazzini family stood out through their role as bourgeois housewives responsible for the alpine residences, where they remained in order to preserve the rights of the hearth and take care of their numerous offspring and family property. They thus offered an anchor to the mobility of the merchants, guaranteeing the preservation of belonging to the community and the maintenance of the enjoyment of its privileges. The rich private documentation, preserved in the family archives and consisting largely of letters, describes a history of the Pedrazzini in which the entrepreneurial mobility of emigrants has highlighted their attachment to their native land.

=== Later generations ===
During the 19th and 20th centuries, after having abandoned the path of emigration, family members perpetuated in Switzerland the prestige of the family tradition, notably in the political and economic domains. Several among them exercised important charges at the cantonal and federal level, in particular Martino and Giovan Battista Pedrazzini.

== See also ==
=== Prominent family members ===
- Giovanni Battista Pedrazzini (1673–1749)
- Maria Apollonia Pedrazzini (1693–1766)
- Michele Pedrazzini (1712–1763)
- Guglielmo Maria Pedrazzini (1733–1801)

== Bibliography ==
- Mondada, Giuseppe: Commerci e commercianti di Campo Valmaggia nel Settecento. Dalle lettere dei Pedrazzini e di altri conterranei attivi in Germania e in Italia, 1977.
- Chiesi Ermotti, Francesca: Le Alpi in movimento. Vicende del casato dei mercanti Pedrazzini di Campo Vallemaggia (XVIII s.), 2019.
