= Pizzo La Scheggia =

Mountain in Italy

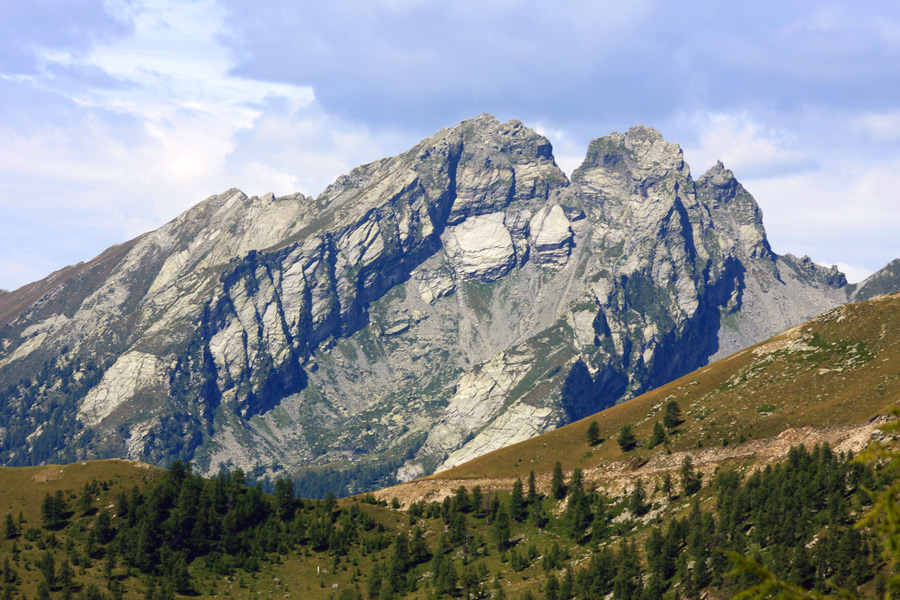

Highest point
- Elevation: 2,466 m (8,091 ft)

Geography
- Location: Piedmont, Italy
- Parent range: Lepontine Alps

Pizzo La Scheggia is a mountain of Piedmont, Italy, with an elevation of 2,466 metres (8,091 ft). It is located in the Lepontine Alps, in the Province of Verbano-Cusio-Ossola, and is part of the Onsermone massif.

Located west of the Pioda di Crana, Pizzo La Scheggia is the highest mountain of Val Vigezzo. It owes its name (Scheggia for scheggiatura, "chip") due to the crack that separates it from the nearby Cima Campelli.

The peak can be reached by a hiking path from Arvogno, a hamlet of Toceno.
