= Gian Maria Rastellini =

Italian painter

- Born: 20 January 1869; Buttogno
- Died: 30 December 1927 (aged 58); Milan
- Education: School of Fine Arts "Rossetti Valentini"
- Known for: Painting
- Movement: Neo-impressionism

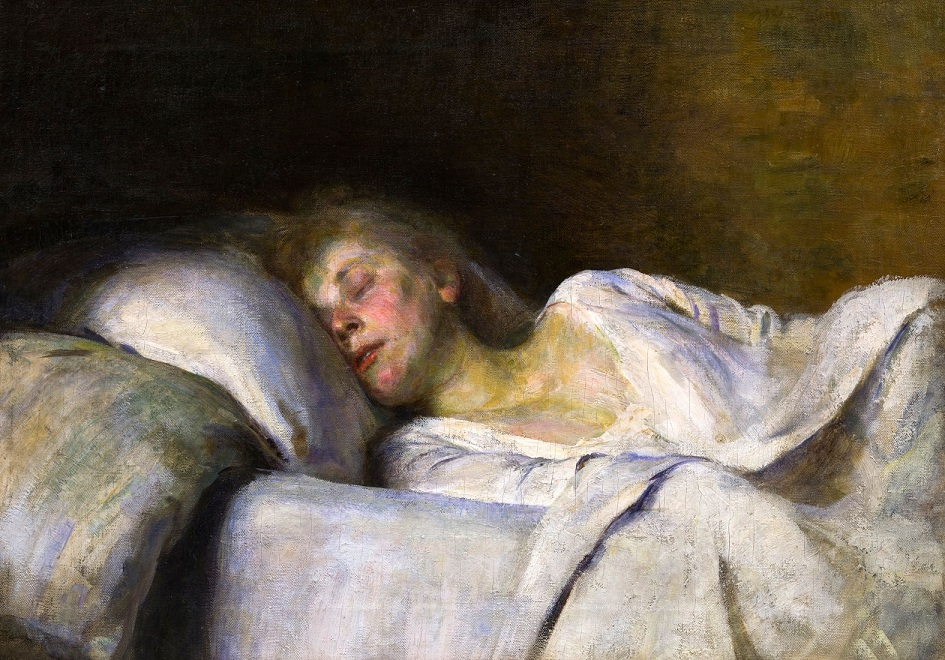
Sognando, 1891

Gian Maria Rastellini (20 January 1869 – 30 December 1927) was an Italian neo-impressionist painter.

== Biography ==
Gian Maria Rastellini was born in Buttogno, a small village in the Valle Vigezzo, to a well-to-do family and was introduced to painting first by his paternal grandfather, Gian Battista Rastellini, then by his father, Gian Giacomo. In 1881 he enrolled, very young, at the Rossetti Valentini Art School in Santa Maria Maggiore, where together with Maurizio Borgnis, Carlo Fornara and Giovanni Battista Ciolina he studied under the guidance of the master Enrico Cavalli until 1887. A precocious artist, he exhibited at the First Triennale of Brera with the painting Il Sogno (The Dream), which was shortlisted by the jury for the Principe Umberto Prize. The same picture was presented at the International Exhibition of the Munich Secession in 1907, where it was awarded a gold medal.

His earliest works were a compelling sequence of portraits, remarkable for their expressiveness and formal vigour. In 1889 he moved with his brother Gian Battista, also a painter, to Milan where he opened a studio. Building on the teachings of Cavalli, he made the lessons of the most open-minded and innovative artists his own, with his work assuming a vaguely symbolist tone. Perhaps his most original production of the 1890s are the scenes and landscapes he painted in Valle Vigezzo such as Interno di stalla (Interior of a stable), Paesaggio invernale verso Buttogno (Winter landscape looking towards Buttogno), Veduta autunnale della valletta (Autumn view of the valley), and Vita umile (Humble life), dictated by autonomous stylistic choices, fruit of a mediation between his early education and his study of Impressionism and the Macchiaioli. Also worthy of note are the portraits in pastels, a technique the artist made full use of throughout the entire arc of his artistic activity.

A multifaceted personality, Rastellini held the offices of Mayor of Buttogno (1899–1902) and president of the Società Elettrica Vigezzina, the Valley's electricity company. Passionate about art and a collector, he made several trips to different parts of Europe to see the great masterpieces preserved in the art galleries and churches. Around 1905, his production ground almost to a halt and from then on he focused exclusively on commissioned portraits. The artist died in 1927 in Milan.

== Exhibitions ==
- "Una scuola di pittura in Val Vigezzo: 1881-1919": Turin/Novara, 1990
- "Gian Maria Rastellini 1869-1927": Pallanza, 1996
- "Alessandro Poscio, collezionista appassionato": Domodossola, 2014
- "Carlo Fornara e il ritratto vigezzino": Domodossola, 2015
- "Brera 1891. L'esposizione che rivoluzionò l'arte moderna": Milan, 2016

== Literature ==
- Thieme-Becker: "Allgemeines Lexikon der Bildenden Künstler von der Antike bis zur Gegenwart", Seemann, Leipzig, 1907-1950
- Benezit Dictionary of Artists, Librairie Gründ. Paris, 2006
- Guido Cesura: "Enrico Cavalli e la pittura vigezzina", Colombi, Milan, 1974
- Davide Ramoni: "Scuola di belle arti Rossetti Valentini in Santa Maria Maggiore. Vicende e contributi alla pittura vigezzina nel centenario della fondazione", tip. S. Gaudenzio, Novara, 1978
- Dario Gnemmi: "Una scuola di pittura in Val Vigezzo: 1881-1919. Carlo Giuseppe ed Enrico Cavalli, Giovanni Battista Ciolina, Carlo Fornara", Il Quadrante, Turin, 1990
- Guido Cesura: "Enrico Cavalli pittore", Grossi, Domodossola, 1993
- Dario Gnemmi: "Retour à la ferme", Biglia Club, Domodossola, 1993
- Sergio Rebora, "Gian Maria Rastellini 1869-1927", Quaderni del Museo del Paesaggio, Pallanza, 1996
- Francesco Ferrari: "La scuola di belle arti Rossetti Valentini in Santa Maria Maggiore", Grossi, Domodossola, 1999
- Dario Gnemmi: "Monticelli e la scuola di Enrico Cavalli", Madame Webb, Domodossola, 2006
- Dario Gnemmi: "Vigezzini di Francia. Pittura d'alpe e d'Oltralpe tra Otto e Novecento in Valle Vigezzo", Skira, Milan, 2007
- Davide Brullo: "Appassionata incompetenza. I primi cinquant'anni della collezione Poscio", Madame Webb, Domodossola, 2011
