= Carlo Fornara =

Italian painter (1871–1968)

- Born: 21 October 1871; Craveggia
- Died: 15 September 1968 (aged 96); Craveggia
- Education: School of Fine Arts "Rossetti Valentini"
- Known for: Painting
- Movement: Neo-impressionism, Divisionism

Carlo Fornara (21 October 1871 – 15 September 1968) was an Italian neo-impressionist and divisionist painter.

== Biography ==
Born in Prestinone (Craveggia) into a humble family of Valle Vigezzo farmers in 1871, his talent emerged after he began attending courses in painting, drawing and ornamentation at the local Rossetti Valentini Art School in Santa Maria Maggiore, where he became close friends with other future painters such as Giovanni Battista Ciolina, Gian Maria Rastellini and Lorenzo Peretti Junior, and absorbed the teachings of Enrico Cavalli, a great connoisseur of the French art of the time, who decisively influenced him to follow the path of painting.

In the spring of 1891, he exhibited two works, La bottega del calderaio (The Tinker’s Workshop) and Ricordanze (Remembrance), at the First Triennale of Brera, a vitally important occasion because there he made contact for the first time with the arising divisionist movement. However, during his stay in Lyon, from 1894 to 1895, in the company of his friend and fellow painter Giovanni Battista Ciolina, Fornara drew closer to the neo-impressionist movement, as he manifested in the work En plein air which was, however, refused in 1897 by the Third Biennale of Brera, despite being judged very positively by artists such as Giuseppe Pellizza da Volpedo and Giovanni Segantini, two of the leading exponents of divisionism.

In 1899, he took part in the Third International Art Exhibition in Venice.

He made the acquaintance of Alberto Grubicy de Dragon, owner of the Grubicy Gallery and brother of the promoter of divisionism in Europe, the art dealer Vittore Grubicy de Dragon, himself a painter, and impressed them both. They put him in touch with Segantini, who employed the young artist as his assistant at the 1900 Paris Exposition Universelle. Thanks to the patronage of the Grubicys, Fornara’s work was presented at all the national and international painting exhibitions of any importance in those years, but his adherence to the divisionist school gradually began to wane until it finally petered out altogether during the 1920s, when the artist began his own painting research in a completely personal style. In 1922, he definitively retired to his beloved Val Vigezzo, where he died in 1968.

== Exhibitions ==
- "Una scuola di pittura in Val Vigezzo: 1881–1919": Turin/Novara, 1990
- "Carlo Fornara. Un maestro del divisionismo": Trento, 1998
- "Carlo Fornara. Il colore della valle": Acqui Terme, 2007
- "Paesaggi dell'Ottocento. Verso la luce": Riva del Garda, 2010
- "Le soglie della natura": Arco di Trento, 2010
- "Alessandro Poscio, collezionista appassionato": Domodossola, 2014
- "Carlo Fornara e il ritratto vigezzino": Domodossola, 2015
- "Brera 1891. L’esposizione che rivoluzionò l’arte moderna": Milan, 2016

== Literature ==
- Thieme-Becker: "Allgemeines Lexikon der Bildenden Künstler von der Antike bis zur Gegenwart", Seemann, Leipzig, 1907–1950
- Raffaele Calzini: "Carlo Fornara", Pizzi, Milan, 1949
- Auctores varii: "Carlo Fornara nel centenario della sua nascita", n. 3 "Oscellana" magazine, Domodossola, 1971
- Marco Valsecchi/Franco Vercelotti: "Carlo Fornara pittore", All'insegna del pesce d'oro, Milan, 1971
- Guido Cesura: "Enrico Cavalli e la pittura vigezzina", Colombi, Milan, 1974
- Davide Ramoni: "Scuola di belle arti Rossetti Valentini in Santa Maria Maggiore. Vicende e contributi alla pittura vigezzina nel centenario della fondazione", tip. S. Gaudenzio, Novara, 1978
- Dario Gnemmi: "Una scuola di pittura in Val Vigezzo: 1881–1919. Carlo Giuseppe ed Enrico Cavalli, Giovanni Battista Ciolina, Carlo Fornara", Il Quadrante, Turin, 1990
- Guido Cesura: "Enrico Cavalli pittore", Grossi, Domodossola, 1993
- Dario Gnemmi: "Retour à la ferme", Biglia Club, Domodossola, 1993
- Annie-Paule Quinsac: "Carlo Fornara. Un maestro del Divisionismo", Skira, Milan, 1998
- Francesco Ferrari: "La scuola di belle arti Rossetti Valentini in Santa Maria Maggiore", Grossi, Domodossola, 1999
- Dario Gnemmi: "Monticelli e la scuola di Enrico Cavalli", Madame Webb, Domodossola, 2006
- Dario Gnemmi: "Vigezzini di Francia. Pittura d'alpe e d'Oltralpe tra Otto e Novecento in Valle Vigezzo", Skira, Milan, 2007
- Giovanna Nicoletti: "Paesaggi dell'Ottocento. Verso la luce", Temi, Trento, 2009
- Davide Brullo: "Carlo Fornara attraverso le lettere ad Amedeo Catapano", Marietti 1820, Bologna, 2010
- Giovanna Nicoletti/Dario Gnemmi: "Le soglie della natura", Grafica 5, Arco di Trento, 2010
- Davide Brullo: "Appassionata incompetenza. I primi cinquant'anni della collezione Poscio", Madame Webb, Domodossola, 2011
