= Lago di Palagnedra =

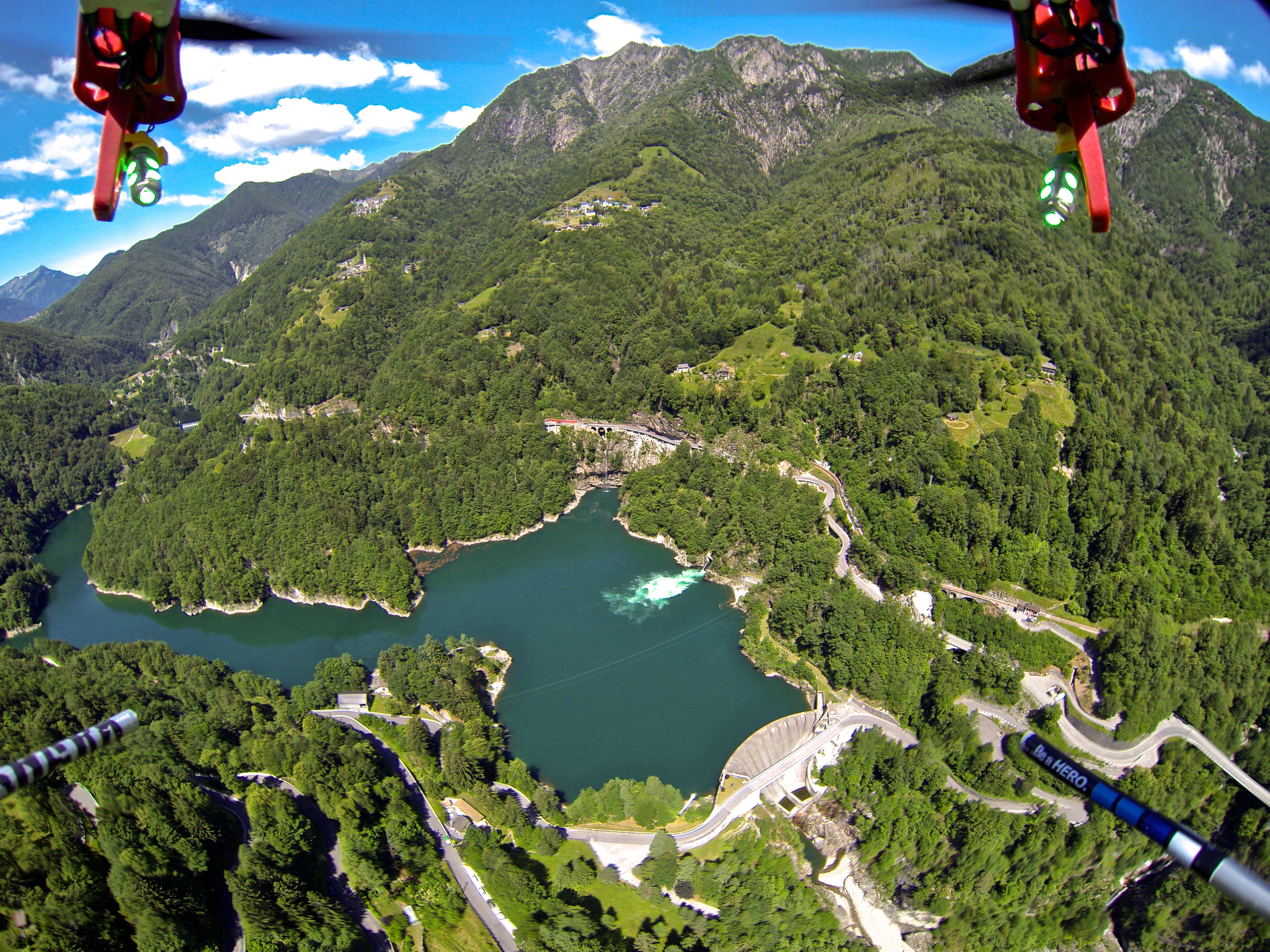
- Aerial view from the east with Pizzo Ruscada

- Location within Canton of Ticino Location within Switzerland Location within Alps
- Interactive map of Lago di Palagnedra
- Location: Ticino
- Coordinates: 46°9′34″N 8°37′37″E
- Type: reservoir
- Primary inflows: Melezza
- Primary outflows: Melezza
- Catchment area: 137.7 km^{2} (53.2 sq mi)
- Basin countries: Switzerland, Italy
- Surface area: 25 ha (62 acres)
- Water volume: 4.26 million cubic metres (3,450 acre⋅ft)
- Surface elevation: 486 m (1,594 ft)

Lago di Palagnedra is a manmade lake at Palagnedra, Ticino, Switzerland. The reservoir has a capacity of 4,260,000 m^{3} (3,450 acre⋅ft) and a surface area of 25 ha (62 acres). The dam on the Melezza river was completed in 1952, height 72 m (236 ft).

The lake lies between Pizzo Ruscada and the Gridone. The north side of the lake is overlooked by the Domodossola-Locarno railway.
