= Giovanni Battista Ciolina =

Italian painter (1870–1955)

- Born: 15 May 1870; Toceno
- Died: 29 May 1955 (aged 85); Toceno
- Education: School of Fine Arts "Rossetti Valentini", Accademia di Belle Arti di Venezia
- Known for: Painting
- Movement: Neo-impressionism, Divisionism

Giovanni Battista Ciolina (15 May 1870 – 29 May 1955) was an Italian neo-impressionist and divisionist painter.

== Biography ==
Born into a family of Valle Vigezzo farmers in 1870, he attended the Rossetti Valentini Art School in Santa Maria Maggiore - where he became close friends with other future painters such as Carlo Fornara, Gian Maria Rastellini and Lorenzo Peretti Junior - for five years, beginning in 1882, absorbing the teachings of Enrico Cavalli, a great connoisseur of the French art of the era and the historic innovator of painting in Valle Vigezzo.

In the late 1880s, he received a two-year scholarship to attend the Scuola libera del nudo at the Accademia di Belle Arti in Venice. A talented and precocious artist, he demonstrated the level of excellence he had achieved with the works Ritratto della madre (Portrait of the Artist’s Mother) (1890) and L'ombrellino rosso (The Little Red Umbrella) (1892). In the company of his friend and fellow painter Carlo Fornara, he spent a long period in Lyon between 1895 and 1896 studying the great masters and learning about the new painting on the other side of the Alps. On his return to Italy he turned to Divisionism, applying the new technique according to the example of Giovanni Segantini. After his first showing, at the Third Triennale of Brera in 1897 with the painting Il filo spezzato (The Broken Thread), he opened a studio in Milan, where he produced numerous paintings in the divisionist style, including La lavandaia (The Washerwoman), Fanciulla che guarda dalla finestra (Girl looking out the window) and Mestizia crepuscolare (Twilight Sorrow). He took part in numerous exhibitions in Italy and abroad, and, after gradually abandoning Divisionism, arrived at the Venice International Art Exhibition of 1907 with the painting Preludio di primavera (Prelude to Spring), making extensive use of impasto and retaining the luminosity of his earliest works, but with the addition of a melancholy lyricism typical of Neo-impressionism, often entrusted to compositions of broad and powerful scope as in paintings Ritorno all’alpe (Return to the mountain pasture) and Toceno al tramonto (Toceno at sunset).

At the outbreak of the Great War, Ciolina left Milan and retired to Valle Vigezzo, where he continued to paint landscapes, still lifes and religious frescoes until his death.

== Exhibitions ==
- "Giovanni Battista Ciolina – Umanità e paesaggi della Val Vigezzo": Museo del Paesaggio, Pallanza, 1986
- "Una scuola di pittura in Val Vigezzo: 1881-1919": Turin/Novara, 1990
- "Carlo Fornara. Un maestro del divisionismo": Trento, 1998
- "Carlo Fornara. Il colore della valle": Acqui Terme, 2007
- "Paesaggi dell'Ottocento. Verso la luce": Riva del Garda, 2010
- "Le soglie della natura": Arco di Trento, 2010
- "Alessandro Poscio, collezionista appassionato": Domodossola, 2014
- "Carlo Fornara e il ritratto vigezzino": Domodossola, 2015

== Literature ==
- Thieme-Becker: "Allgemeines Lexikon der Bildenden Künstler von der Antike bis zur Gegenwart", Seemann, Leipzig, 1907-1950
- Guido Cesura: "Enrico Cavalli e la pittura vigezzina", Colombi, Milan, 1974
- Davide Ramoni: "Scuola di belle arti Rossetti Valentini in Santa Maria Maggiore. Vicende e contributi alla pittura vigezzina nel centenario della fondazione", tip. S. Gaudenzio, Novara, 1978
- Aurora Scotti: "Giovanni Battista Ciolina, umanità e paesaggi della valle Vigezzo", Vangelista, Verbania, 1986
- Dario Gnemmi: "Una scuola di pittura in Val Vigezzo: 1881-1919. Carlo Giuseppe ed Enrico Cavalli, Giovanni Battista Ciolina, Carlo Fornara", Il Quadrante, Turin, 1990
- Guido Cesura: "Enrico Cavalli pittore", Grossi, Domodossola, 1993
- Dario Gnemmi: "Retour à la ferme", Biglia Club, Domodossola, 1993
- Annie-Paule Quinsac: "Carlo Fornara. Un maestro del Divisionismo", Skira, Milan, 1998
- Francesco Ferrari: "La scuola di belle arti Rossetti Valentini in Santa Maria Maggiore", Grossi, Domodossola, 1999
- Dario Gnemmi: "Monticelli e la scuola di Enrico Cavalli", Madame Webb, Domodossola, 2006
- Dario Gnemmi: "Vigezzini di Francia. Pittura d'alpe e d'Oltralpe tra Otto e Novecento in Valle Vigezzo", Skira, Milan, 2007
- Giovanna Nicoletti: "Paesaggi dell'Ottocento. Verso la luce", Temi, Trento, 2009
- Giovanna Nicoletti/Dario Gnemmi: "Le soglie della natura", Grafica 5, Arco di Trento, 2010
- Davide Brullo: "Appassionata incompetenza. I primi cinquant'anni della collezione Poscio", Madame Webb, Domodossola, 2011
