= Giovan Maria Salati =

Italian soldier (1796–1879)

- Born: 1796; Malesco, Italy
- Died: 1879 (aged 82–83); Paris, France
- Occupation: Soldier
- Known for: Claimed first person to "swim" across the English Channel (disputed)

Giovan Maria Salati (1796–1879) was a Napoleonic soldier.

== Biography ==
Giovan Maria Salati was born to Domenico and Anna Maria Salati of Malesco, Piedmont, Italy in 1796.

Giovan initially worked in Malesco as a chimney sweep, but enlisted with the Grand Army of Napoleon in 1812 as a rifleman. He was taken prisoner by the British after the Battle of Waterloo, and held on a prison barge moored at Dover, England.

Giovan subsequently claimed that on the night of 16 August 1817 he made his escape by jumping off of the barge so he could attempt to cross the English Channel, using a bundle of straw as a buoyancy aid. The escape attempt was successful as, the following day, he managed to land at Boulogne. He survived to marry, have children, and lived in France until his death in 1879.

== Recognition ==
A permanent exhibition dedicated to Giovan Maria Salati now exists in the town of Malesco, near Domodossola, Italy.

== See also ==
- List of successful English Channel swimmers
