= Pioda di Crana =

Mountain in Italy

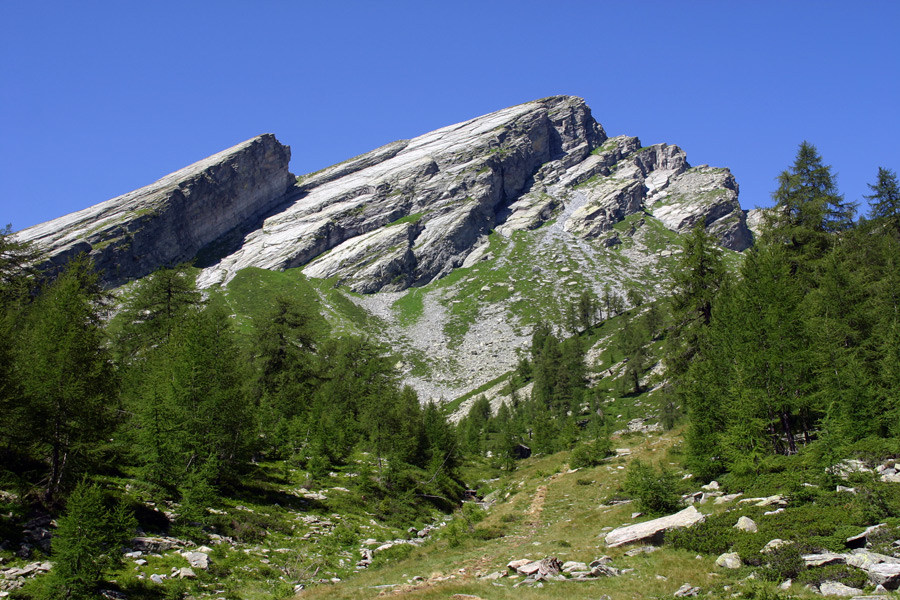

Highest point
- Elevation: 2,430 m (7,970 ft)
- Prominence: 240 m (790 ft)

Geography
- Location: Piedmont, Italy
- Parent range: Lepontine Alps

The Pioda di Crana is a mountain of Piedmont, Italy, with an elevation of 2,430 metres (7,972 ft). It is located in the Lepontine Alps, in the Province of Verbano-Cusio-Ossola, and is part of the Onsermone massif.

The mountain lies between the Valle Isorno and Val Vigezzo, not far from the border with Switzerland, and is linked by a ridge to the nearby Cima dei Casaletti, Pizzo La Scheggia and Pizzo Locciabella.

The peak can be reached by a hiking path from Arvogno, a hamlet of Toceno.
