= Enrico Cavalli =

Italian painter (1849–1919)

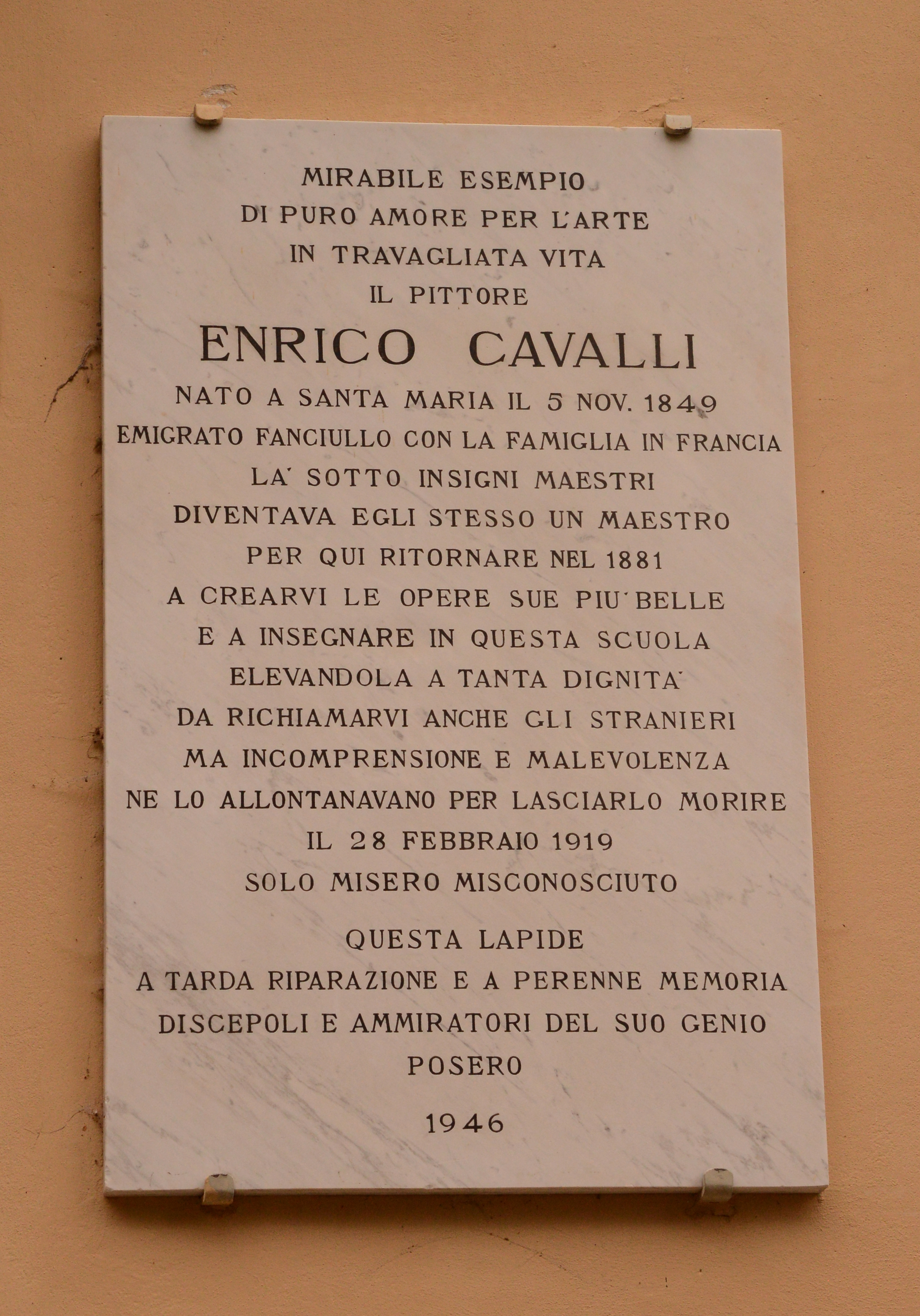
- Born: 5 November 1849; Santa Maria Maggiore, Piedmont
- Died: 28 February 1919 (aged 69); Santa Maria Maggiore
- Education: École nationale supérieure des beaux-arts de Lyon
- Known for: Painting
- Movement: Post-Impressionism

Enrico Cavalli (5 November 1849 – 28 February 1919) was an Italian post-impressionist painter.

== Biography ==
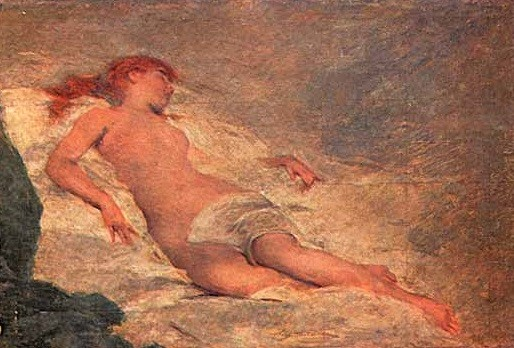
Sleeping Girl

Son of the painter Carlo Giuseppe Cavalli and Francesca Motta, he left Santa Maria Maggiore (Ossola Valley) for France when his family moved there in 1855. After spending the first three years in Grenoble, he lived for ten years in Lyon where he enrolled at the National Academy of Fine Arts. He took the courses taught by the master Joseph Guichard and made contact with other protagonists of the art scene such as François-Auguste Ravier, François Vernay, Louis Carrand and Jean Seignemartin. The outbreak of the Franco-Prussian War impelled the Cavalli family to move first to Paris, then to Marseille, where Enrico met and frequented Adolphe Monticelli, whose teachings on the subject of light and colour greatly influenced the young Italian painter. His pictorial production of this period remains largely unknown, however we do know that two portraits by Cavalli were accepted for the Paris Salon of 1881 and particularly admired by the critic of magazine L'Illustrazione Italiana.

The Cavalli family returned to Santa Maria Maggiore, where Carlo Giuseppe and Enrico taught at the local Rossetti Valentini Art School from 1881 until 1892. Enrico was good stimulating and involving his students – who included Carlo Fornara, Giovanni Battista Ciolina, Gian Maria Rastellini, and Lorenzo Peretti Junior – through the study of the masters and practical experience en plein air, according to the rules of modernity he had learnt in France.

Enrico Cavalli's teaching experience at the small academy in the Val Vigezzo was brusquely interrupted in 1892 by the death of his father, who officially held the position. The school's Administrative Commission announced a competition to replace Carlo Giuseppe Cavalli without taking into consideration the decade-long experience of his son, who abandoned the field in protest. Accompanied at first by Fornara and Peretti Junior, the former teacher left again for France, beginning a tormented journey that saw him wandering from place to place until, in 1901, he returned home to accept a temporary teaching post at the same Rossetti Valentini School, which nevertheless was not renewed at the end of the school year. There followed another fifteen years of commissioned works, restorations and private lessons in Italy and France. Only in 1917, with the support of some Santa Maria Maggiore notables, was the artist assigned a permanent teaching position at the Rossetti Valentini School, where he taught until his death.

In 1946, on the initiative of Carlo Fornara and arts patron Amedeo Catapano, a commemorative plaque was placed on the facade of the Rossetti Valentini School, its polemical tone aimed at those who had prevented Cavalli from succeeding his father as director of the school. Also in 1946, the Municipality of Santa Maria Maggiore dedicated the street, in which the School of Fine Arts is located, to Enrico Cavalli.

== Exhibitions ==
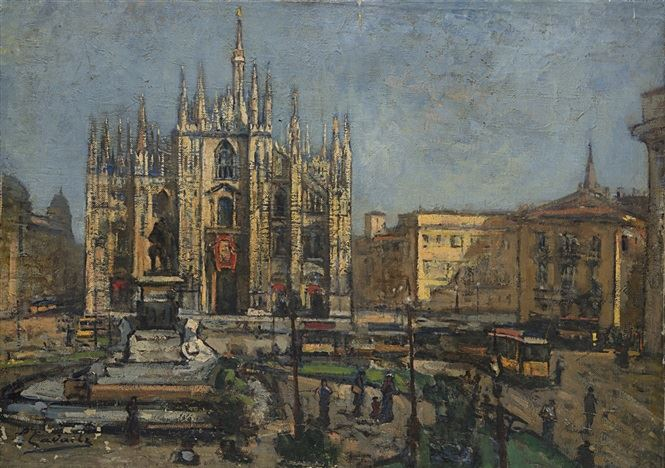
Milan Cathedral

- "Una scuola di pittura in Val Vigezzo: 1881–1919": Turin/Novara, 1990
- "Paesaggi dell'Ottocento. Verso la luce": Riva del Garda, 2010
- "Le soglie della natura": Arco di Trento, 2010
- "Alessandro Poscio, collezionista appassionato": Domodossola, 2014
- "Carlo Fornara e il ritratto vigezzino": Domodossola, 2015

== Literature ==
- Guido Cesura: "Enrico Cavalli e la pittura vigezzina", Colombi, Milan, 1974
- Davide Ramoni: "Scuola di belle arti Rossetti Valentini in Santa Maria Maggiore. Vicende e contributi alla pittura vigezzina nel centenario della fondazione", tip. S. Gaudenzio, Novara, 1978
- Dario Gnemmi: "Una scuola di pittura in Val Vigezzo: 1881–1919. Carlo Giuseppe ed Enrico Cavalli, Giovanni Battista Ciolina, Carlo Fornara", Il Quadrante, Turin, 1990
- Guido Cesura: "Enrico Cavalli pittore", Grossi, Domodossola, 1993
- Dario Gnemmi: "Retour à la ferme", Biglia Club, Domodossola, 1993
- Francesco Ferrari: "La scuola di belle arti Rossetti Valentini in Santa Maria Maggiore", Grossi, Domodossola, 1999
- Dario Gnemmi: "Monticelli e la scuola di Enrico Cavalli", Madame Webb, Domodossola, 2006
- Dario Gnemmi: "Vigezzini di Francia. Pittura d'alpe e d'Oltralpe tra Otto e Novecento in Valle Vigezzo", Skira, Milan, 2007
- Giovanna Nicoletti: "Paesaggi dell'Ottocento. Verso la luce", Temi, Trento, 2009
- Giovanna Nicoletti/Dario Gnemmi: "Le soglie della natura", Grafica 5, Arco di Trento, 2010
- Davide Brullo: "Appassionata incompetenza. I primi cinquant'anni della collezione Poscio", Madame Webb, Domodossola, 2011
