= Melezzo Occidentale =

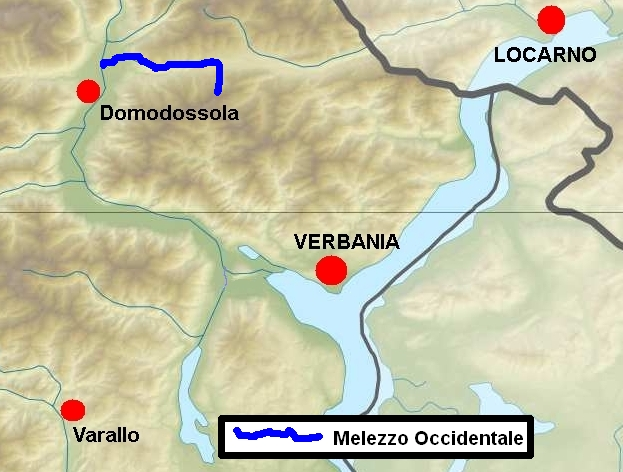
- Location within NE Piedmont

Location
- Country: Italy

Physical characteristics
- Source
  - location: Pizzo Ragno
  - elevation: 2,289 m (7,510 ft)
- Mouth
  - location: Toce at Domodossola
  - coordinates: 46.1268°N 8.3055°E
- Length: 13 km (8.1 mi)

Basin features
- Progression: Toce→ Lake Maggiore→ Ticino→ Po→ Adriatic Sea

The Melezzo Occidentale is a 13 km Alpine torrent which runs through the western part of the Val Vigezzo, a side valley of the Ossola in the Province of Verbano Cusio Ossola, northern Italy. Belonging to the Po basin, it is a left tributary of the Toce which in its turn flows into Lago Maggiore.

The river is formed by the confluence of various streams to the west of Druogno (which marks the watershed between the western and eastern sections of the Val Vigezzo), and runs westward through the narrow valley which connects the high plain of the central Val Vigezza to the Val d’Ossola. After a course of 13 km, which takes it through the commune of Masera and entails a descent of about 2000 m, it joins the Toce near Domodossola.

== See also ==
- Melezzo Orientale
