= Maria Apollonia Pedrazzini =

Swiss noblewoman

- Born: Maria Apollonia Franzoni; 1693; Cevio, Switzerland
- Died: 25 January 1766; Campo, Vallemaggia, Switzerland
- Occupation: Administrator of family estates
- Spouse: Michele Pedrazzini
- Parent(s): Carlo Francesco Franzoni; Giovanna Lamberti

Maria Apollonia Pedrazzini (née Franzoni; 1693 – 25 January 1766) was a prominent Catholic figure in the Pedrazzini family following the death of her husband.

In 1719, through a generous dowry provided by her father, Maria married Michele Pedrazzini, from a prestigious merchant family, formalizing an alliance between the Franzoni, part of the sedentary elite, and the merchant bourgeoisie.

In 1736, widowed without an heir, she obtained the usufruct of a rich patrimony. With the help of her family and active management of her assets, she distinguished herself through her generosity toward religious works, confirmed by her will, earning her admiration and influence until her death. These acts of generosity illustrate a rare strategy for widows and influential alpine women to access informal power.

== Origins and family ==
Maria Apollonia Pedrazzini was born in 1693 in Cevio. She was the third daughter of banneret Carlo Francesco Franzoni, of Cevio, and Giovanna Lamberti, of Campo.

== Arranged marriage with the merchant bourgeoisie ==
Her father arranged her marriage to Michele Pedrazzini, the younger son of his cousin Gaspare and a prominent member of the merchant family from Campo.

In 1719, her father paid a considerable dowry of 1,000 écus, reflecting the esteem in which the groom's family was held and the interest of the sedentary elite, to which the Franzoni belonged, in establishing an alliance with the merchant bourgeoisie.

== Usufructuary of a rich patrimony ==
In 1736, following the death of her husband without leaving an heir, Maria Apollonia Pedrazzini was appointed usufructuary of a substantial patrimony.

In 1758, a reassessment of possessions revealed that she benefited from a supplement to her dowry in the form of a land inheritance in Campo: she received the attribution of the considerable land holdings of banneret Franzoni. Although she could not claim rights to the Pedrazzini business in Kassel, her fortune was enriched by lands located in an alpine commune, in Val Maggia, and near Locarno, as well as numerous credits.

== Administrator of her patrimony ==
For the administration of her patrimony, Maria Apollonia Pedrazzini initially benefited from the support of her younger brother and curator, Carlo Antonio Franzoni, the banneret who also acted as executor of her deceased husband's will, before receiving help from her nephew, Michele Pedrazzini. Other members of the Pedrazzini family also contributed, in her name, to preparing inventories, claiming interest, and investing capital.

Her handwriting appears on documents related to the collection of rents, revealing her writing competence and active engagement in the management of her assets.

During her thirty years of widowhood, until her death in 1766, Maria Apollonia Pedrazzini was admired and wielded considerable influence. She made significant contributions to several confraternities and religious institutions, an act of generosity clearly highlighted in her will.

== Death ==
Maria Apollonia Pedrazzini died on 25 January 1766 in Campo (Vallemaggia).

== Bibliography ==
- Pedrazzini, Michelangelo: "Spese per un funerale di nobildonna in Campo V. M. nel 1766", in: Bollettino storico della Svizzera italiana, 1942/4, pp. 191-193.
- Filippini, Federico: "Genealogia dei Franzoni dal 1400 al 1945", in: Rivista storica ticinese, 45, 1945, pp. 1076-1078.
- Chiesi, Francesca: ""Al di lui genio". Autorevolezza vedovile nel casato mercantile dei Pedrazzini", in: Archivio storico ticinese, 144, 2008, pp. 201-232.
- Chiesi Ermotti, Francesca: Le Alpi in movimento. Vicende del casato dei mercanti Pedrazzini di Campo Vallemaggia (XVIII s.), 2019.

=== Archival sources ===
- Archivio di Stato del Cantone Ticino, Bellinzone, Archivio delle Famiglie Pedrazzini di Campo Vallemaggia.
