= Pizzo Ragno =

Mountain in Italy

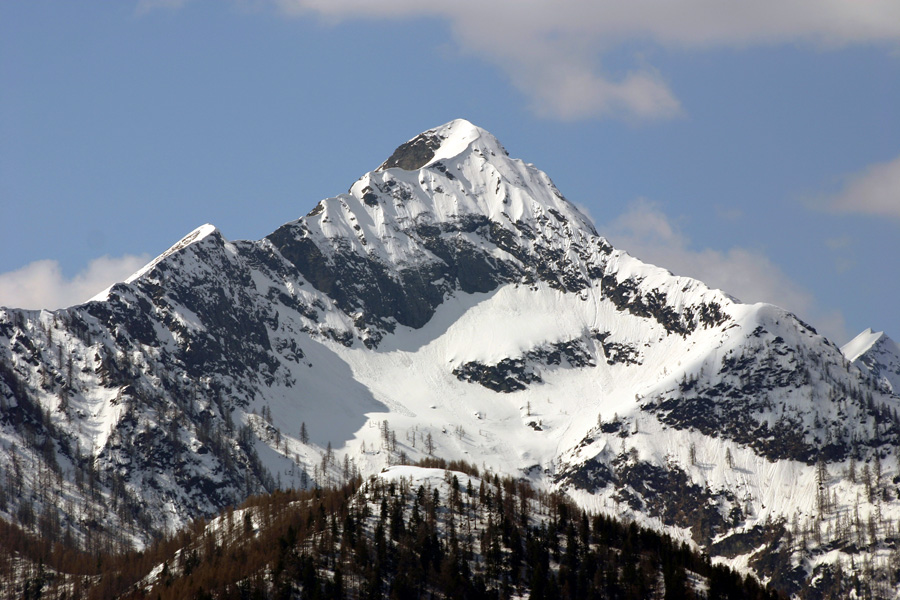
- Pizzo Ragno in winter

Highest point
- Elevation: 2,289 m (7,510 ft)
- Prominence: 228 m (748 ft)

Geography
- Location: Piedmont, Italy
- Parent range: Lepontine Alps

Pizzo Ragno is a mountain of Piedmont, Italy, with an elevation of 2,289 metres (7,510 ft). It is located in the Lepontine Alps, in the Province of Verbano-Cusio-Ossola, between the Val Vigezzo and the smaller Val Loana.

The peak is a renowned panoramic point and can be reached on foot starting from Druogno, Santa Maria Maggiore, or Malesco.
