= Pizzo Ruscada =

Mountain in Switzerland

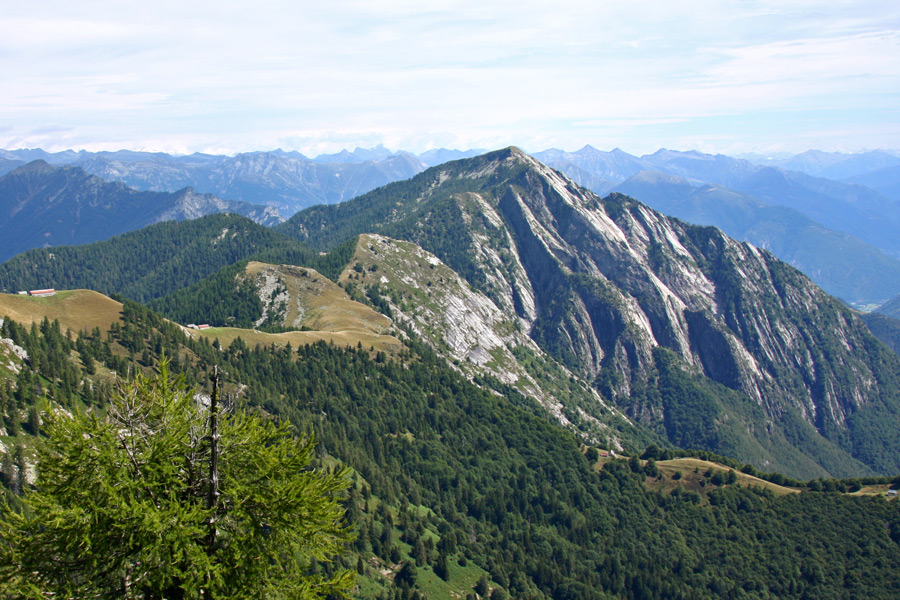
- View from Monte Ziccher (west side)

Highest point
- Elevation: 2,004 m (6,575 ft)
- Prominence: 330 m (1,080 ft)
- Coordinates: 46°10′38.7″N 8°35′33.9″E

Geography
- Location within Switzerland
- Location: Ticino, Switzerland
- Parent range: Lepontine Alps

Pizzo Ruscada is a mountain of the Lepontine Alps, overlooking Borgnone in the Swiss canton of Ticino. It lies on the range between the valley of Onsernone (north) and Centovalli (south).
