= Villette, Piedmont =

Villette
- Comune
- Comune di Villette
- Location within Italy Location within Piedmont
- Coordinates: 46°7′N 8°32′E
- Country: Italy
- Region: Piedmont
- Province: Province of Verbano-Cusio-Ossola (VB)

Government
  - Mayor: Monica Balassi

Area
  - Total: 7.4 km^{2} (2.9 sq mi)
- Elevation: 807 m (2,648 ft)

Population (Dec. 2004)
  - Total: 250
  - Density: 34/km^{2} (87/sq mi)
- Demonym: Villettesi
- Time zone: UTC+1 (CET)
  - Summer (DST): UTC+2 (CEST)
- Postal code: 28030
- Dialing code: 0324
- Website: Official website

Villette (Lombard: Vilèt) is a comune (municipality) in the Province of Verbano-Cusio-Ossola in the Italian region Piedmont, located about 140 kilometres (87 mi) northeast of Turin and about 20 kilometres (12 mi) north of Verbania. As of 31 December 2004, it had a population of 250 and an area of 7.4 square kilometres (2.9 mi^{2}).

Villette borders the following municipalities: Craveggia, Malesco, Re.

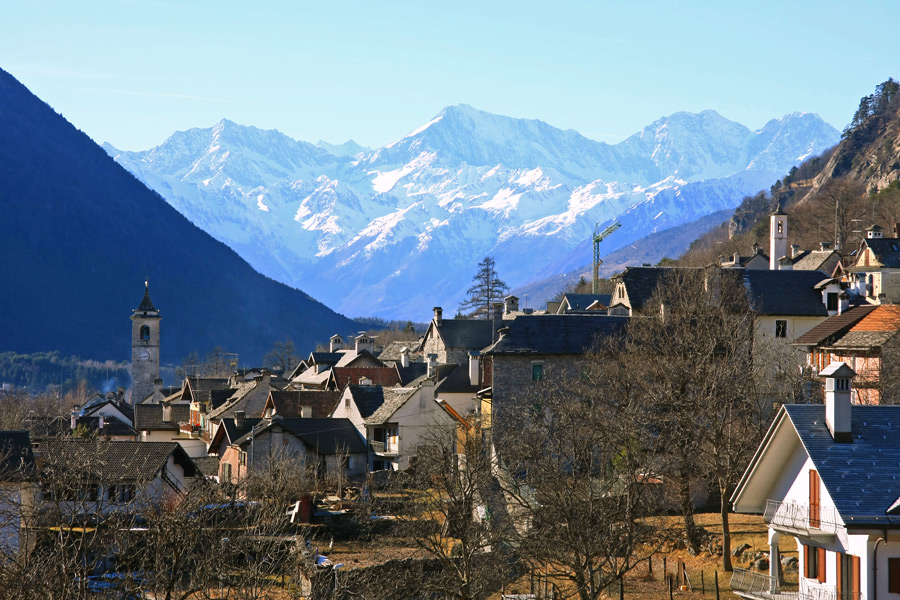
view of the town

== Demographic evolution ==
Historical population

Year	Pop.	±%
1861	394	—
1871	393	−0.3%
1881	390	−0.8%
1901	392	+0.5%
1911	365	−6.9%

Year	Pop.	±%
1921	385	+5.5%
1931	356	−7.5%
1936	337	−5.3%
1951	365	+8.3%
1961	304	−16.7%

Year	Pop.	±%
1971	256	−15.8%
1981	257	+0.4%
1991	233	−9.3%
2001	244	+4.7%

Source: Data from ISTAT
