= Craveggia =

- Comune
- Comune di Craveggia
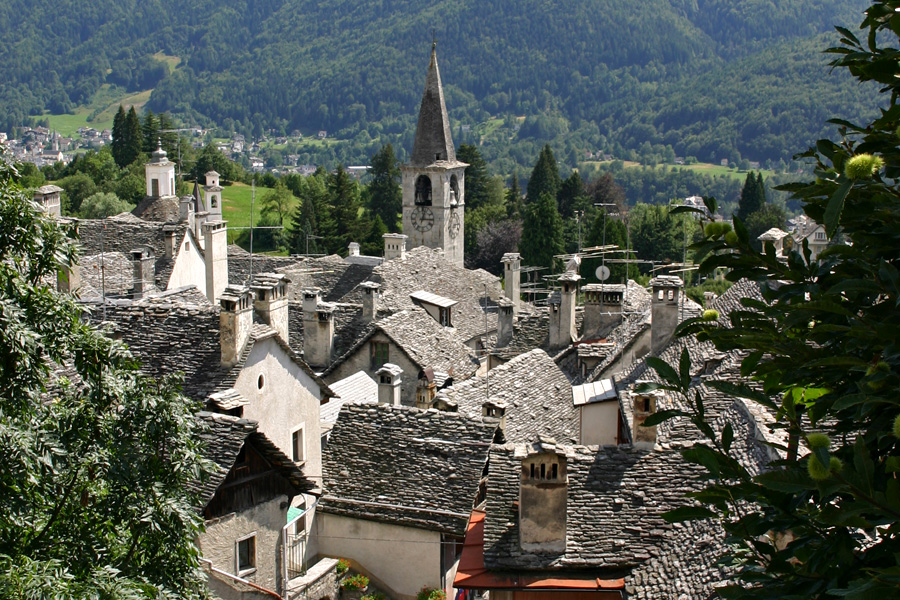
- View of Craveggia

- Location within Italy Location within Piedmont
- Coordinates: 46°8′N 8°30′E
- Country: Italy
- Region: Piedmont
- Province: Province of Verbano-Cusio-Ossola (VB)
- Frazioni: Bagni di Craveggia, Vocogno, Prestinone, La Piana

Government
  - Mayor: Paolo Giovanola

Area
  - Total: 36.5 km^{2} (14.1 sq mi)
- Elevation: 889 m (2,917 ft)

Population (Dec. 2004)
  - Total: 756
  - Density: 20.7/km^{2} (53.6/sq mi)
- Demonym: Craveggesi
- Time zone: UTC+1 (CET)
  - Summer (DST): UTC+2 (CEST)
- Postal code: 28852
- Dialing code: 0324
- Patron saint: San Giacomo e Cristoforo
- Saint day: 25 July

Craveggia is a comune (municipality) in the Province of Verbano-Cusio-Ossola in the Italian region Piedmont, located about 130 kilometres (81 mi) northeast of Turin and about 20 kilometres (12 mi) north of Domodossola, on the border with Switzerland. As of 31 December 2004, it had a population of 756 and an area of 36.5 square kilometres (14.1 mi^{2}).

Craveggia borders the following municipalities: Malesco, Onsernone (Switzerland), Re, Santa Maria Maggiore, Toceno, Vergeletto (Switzerland), Villette.

== Demographic evolution ==
Historical population

Year	Pop.	±%
1861	1,076	—
1871	1,065	−1.0%
1881	1,114	+4.6%
1901	1,095	−1.7%
1911	1,037	−5.3%

Year	Pop.	±%
1921	1,000	−3.6%
1931	981	−1.9%
1936	1,039	+5.9%
1951	949	−8.7%
1961	833	−12.2%

Year	Pop.	±%
1971	738	−11.4%
1981	742	+0.5%
1991	762	+2.7%
2001	723	−5.1%

Source: Data from ISTAT
