= Malesco =

- Comune
- Comune di Malesco
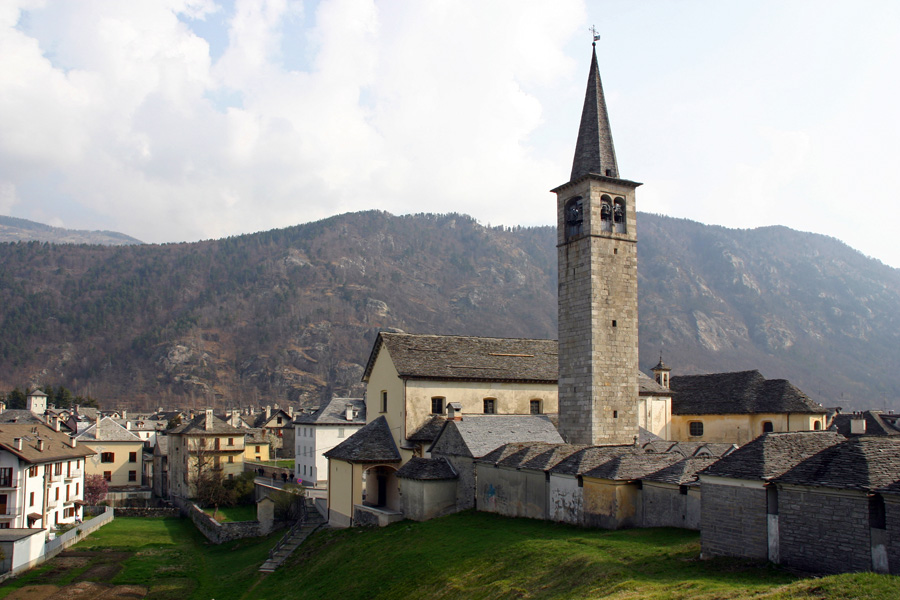
- Malesco. Parish church

- Location within Italy Location within Piedmont
- Coordinates: 46°8′N 8°30′E
- Country: Italy
- Region: Piedmont
- Province: Province of Verbano-Cusio-Ossola (VB)
- Frazioni: Finero, Zornasco

Area
  - Total: 43.2 km^{2} (16.7 sq mi)

Population (Dec. 2004)
  - Total: 1,478
  - Density: 34.2/km^{2} (88.6/sq mi)
- Time zone: UTC+1 (CET)
  - Summer (DST): UTC+2 (CEST)
- Postal code: 28030
- Dialing code: 0324
- Website: Official website

Malesco (Lombard: Malesch) is a comune (municipality) in the Province of Verbano-Cusio-Ossola in the Italian region Piedmont, located about 130 kilometres (81 mi) northeast of Turin and about 20 kilometres (12 mi) north of Verbania, the provincial capital. As of 31 December 2004, it had a population of 1,478 and an area of 43.2 square kilometres (16.7 mi^{2}).

Malesco is the most populous comune in Val Vigezzo and has a station on the Domodossola–Locarno railway which runs along the valley. The neighbouring municipalities are: Cossogno, Craveggia, Re, Santa Maria Maggiore, Trontano, Valle Cannobina, Villette.

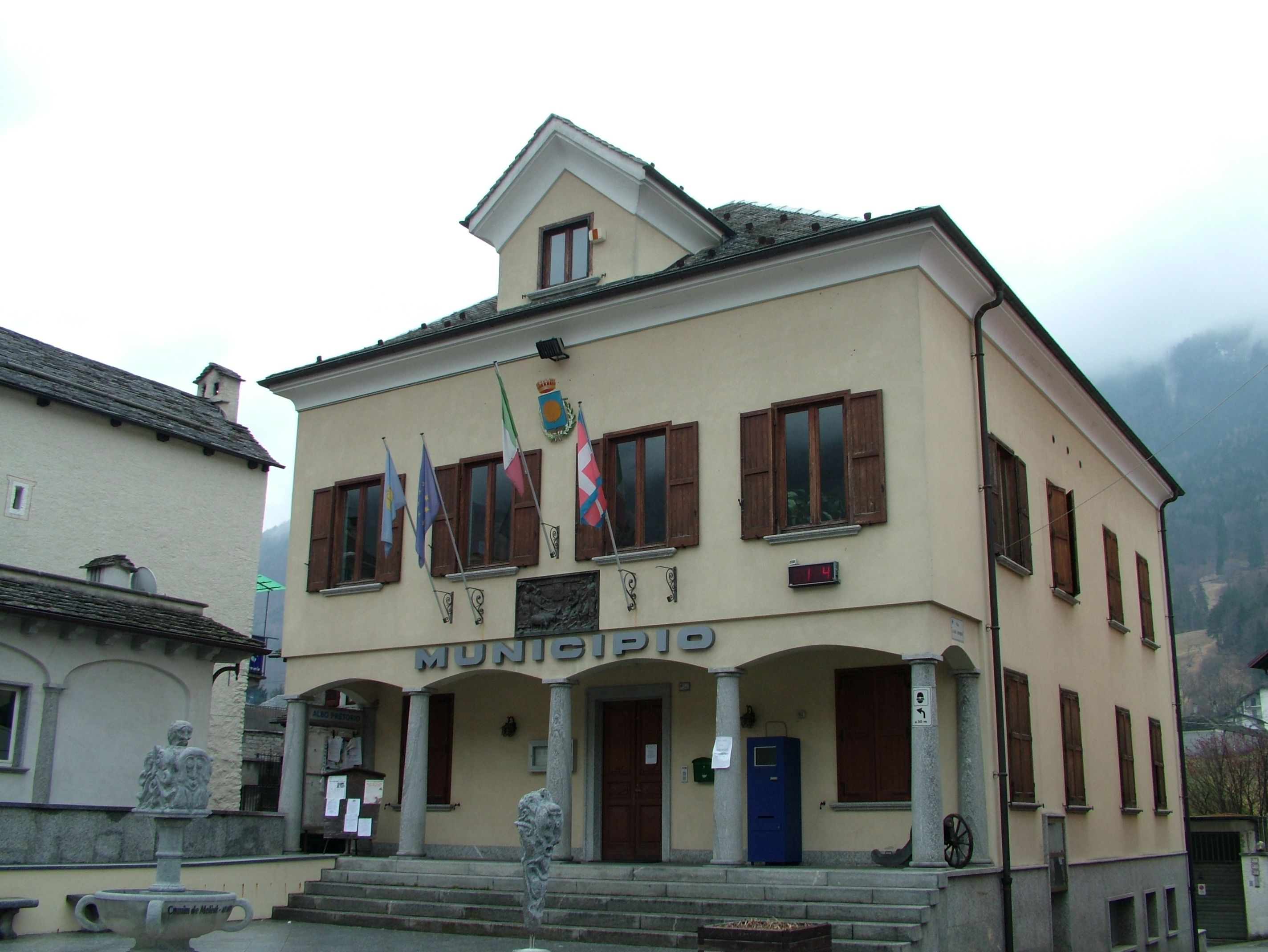
the Town Hall

== Demographic evolution ==
Historical population

Year	Pop.	±%
1861	1,002	—
1871	962	−4.0%
1881	969	+0.7%
1901	1,050	+8.4%
1911	1,260	+20.0%

Year	Pop.	±%
1921	1,260	+0.0%
1931	1,147	−9.0%
1936	1,211	+5.6%
1951	1,371	+13.2%
1961	1,316	−4.0%

Year	Pop.	±%
1971	1,470	+11.7%
1981	1,533	+4.3%
1991	1,495	−2.5%
2001	1,473	−1.5%

Source: Data from ISTAT
