= Colonial goods =

Goods produced in colonies

In economics, colonial goods are goods exported from colonies to other regions. Typical colonial goods include coffee, tea, spices, rice, sugar, cocoa and chocolate, and tobacco.

The introduction of colonial goods can revolutionise consumer habits.

At a time when food and agriculture represented a relatively large proportion of overall economic activity, economic statistics often divided traded goods between "colonial goods", "domestic (agricultural and extractive sectors) production" and "manufactured (secondary sector) production".

== History ==
Trade in colonial goods of the day between the metropolitan Greeks and their colonies flourished in ancient times.

The term "colonial goods" became less appropriate with the collapse of the western European empires that followed the Second World War. It nevertheless still appeared in books and articles in the 1970s, by now covering not merely agricultural output from (formerly) colonial countries but all long-life staple foods, regardless of provenance, as well as soap, washing powder and petrol/gasoline, and other newly important basic household supplies.

== Colonial goods stores ==
Colonial goods stores were retailers specializing in colonial goods. The name is now used generically for grocery stores selling non-perishable items.
