= Michele Pedrazzini =

18th-century Swiss-Italian merchant and military officer

- Born: 1712; Campo, Vallemaggia
- Died: 1763 (aged 50–51); Campo, Vallemaggia
- Occupations: Merchant, Captain
- Spouse: Giovanna Fantina (m. 1737) Maria Justa Camani (m. 1753)
- Children: 4 daughters
- Parent(s): Giovanni Battista Pedrazzini; Marta Camani

Michele Pedrazzini (1712–1763) was a Swiss merchant and captain from Campo in the Vallemaggia. He was active in the family business in Kassel and served as captain of the Maggia Valley and Lavizzara Valley.

== Early life and family ==
Michele Pedrazzini was born in 1712 in Campo, Vallemaggia, the fifth of ten children of Giovanni Battista Pedrazzini, a merchant, and Marta Camani. Despite not being the eldest son, his father chose him as heir over his older brother Giovanni Pietro Pedrazzini, who was probably excluded from the succession due to a disability and received land in compensation for this exclusion.

In 1737, Giovanni Battista Pedrazzini transferred his shares in the Kassel store to Michele. The same year, Michele married Giovanna Fantina, with whom he had four daughters. After becoming a widower, he remarried in 1753 to Maria Justa Camani, daughter of Carlo Antonio Camani, a merchant from Cimalmotto established in Parma. The couple had no children together. For his two daughters who reached adulthood and whom he designated as heirs to his substantial patrimony, Michele Pedrazzini arranged marriages with the sons of his cousin Giovanni Battista Pedrazzini, thus avoiding the extinction of his lineage.

== Career ==
Michele Pedrazzini, a reputed and competent entrepreneur, is documented from 1727 in the Kassel business. He dedicated himself tirelessly to its management, giving it a personal touch. Active in the Hessian city until around the late 1750s, he served as tribune (1750) and then as standard-bearer (1758). His successful merchant career allowed him to increase his patrimony consisting of lands and buildings located between the Maggia Valley and Gambarogno, as well as several credits, which he managed with particular skill.

In 1759, he was appointed captain of the Maggia Valley and Lavizzara Valley, a title that honored the reputation he had also acquired with the authorities of the bailiwick.

== Patronage and cultural activities ==
In his homeland, Michele Pedrazzini promoted and financed numerous initiatives. These included the construction and decoration of the oratory of Saint John the Baptist in Campo, commissioned by his father, the creation of the fresco cycle in the parish church of Saint Bernard, and the production of precious sacred ornaments for local churches. His reputation, refinement, and prosperity were also manifested in his extensive collection of paintings and numerous valuable objects that he had brought from abroad to embellish his house in Campo.

== Death ==
Michele Pedrazzini died in 1763 at his home in Campo, where he had spent his final years after retiring from active business in Kassel.

== Bibliography ==
- Mondada, Giuseppe: Commerci e commercianti di Campo Valmaggia nel Settecento. Dalle lettere dei Pedrazzini e di altri conterranei attivi in Germania e in Italia, 1977.
- Chiesi Ermotti, Francesca: Le Alpi in movimento. Vicende del casato dei mercanti Pedrazzini di Campo Vallemaggia (XVIII s.), 2019.
