= Santa Maria Maggiore, Piedmont =

Santa Maria Maggiore Santa Marìa
- Comune
- Comune di Santa Maria Maggiore
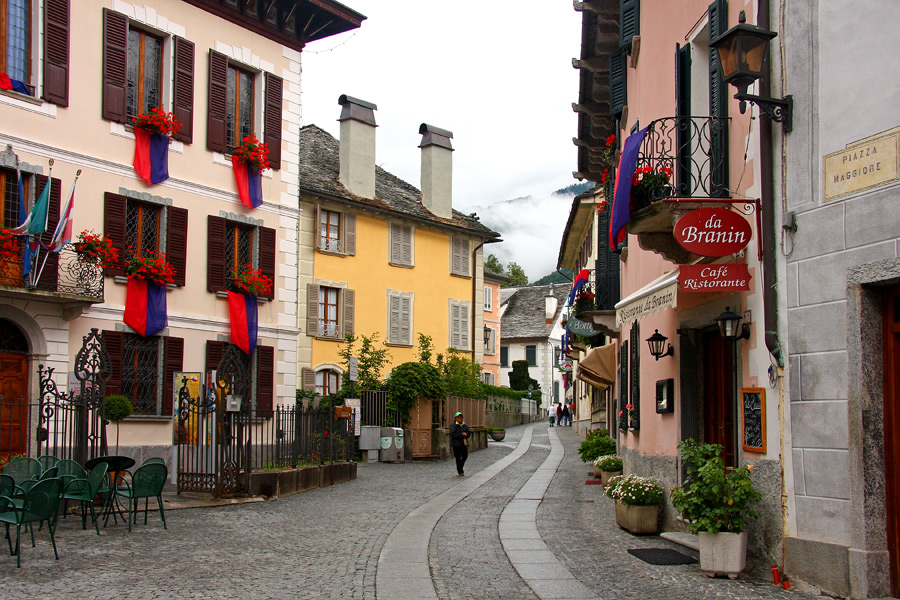

- Location within Italy Location within Piedmont
- Coordinates: 46°8′N 8°28′E
- Country: Italy
- Region: Piedmont
- Province: Province of Verbano-Cusio-Ossola (VB)

Area
  - Total: 53.2 km^{2} (20.5 sq mi)
- Elevation: 816 m (2,677 ft)

Population (Dec. 2004)
  - Total: 1,236
  - Density: 23.2/km^{2} (60.2/sq mi)
- Demonym: Maggioritani
- Time zone: UTC+1 (CET)
  - Summer (DST): UTC+2 (CEST)
- Postal code: 28038
- Dialing code: 0324
- Website: Official website

Santa Maria Maggiore (Ossolano: Santa Marìa) is a comune (municipality) in the Province of Verbano-Cusio-Ossola in the Italian region Piedmont, in Valle Vigezzo, located about 130 kilometres (81 mi) northeast of Turin and about 25 kilometres (16 mi) north of Verbania, on the border with Switzerland. As of 31 December 2004, it had a population of 1,236 and an area of 53.2 square kilometres (20.5 mi^{2}).

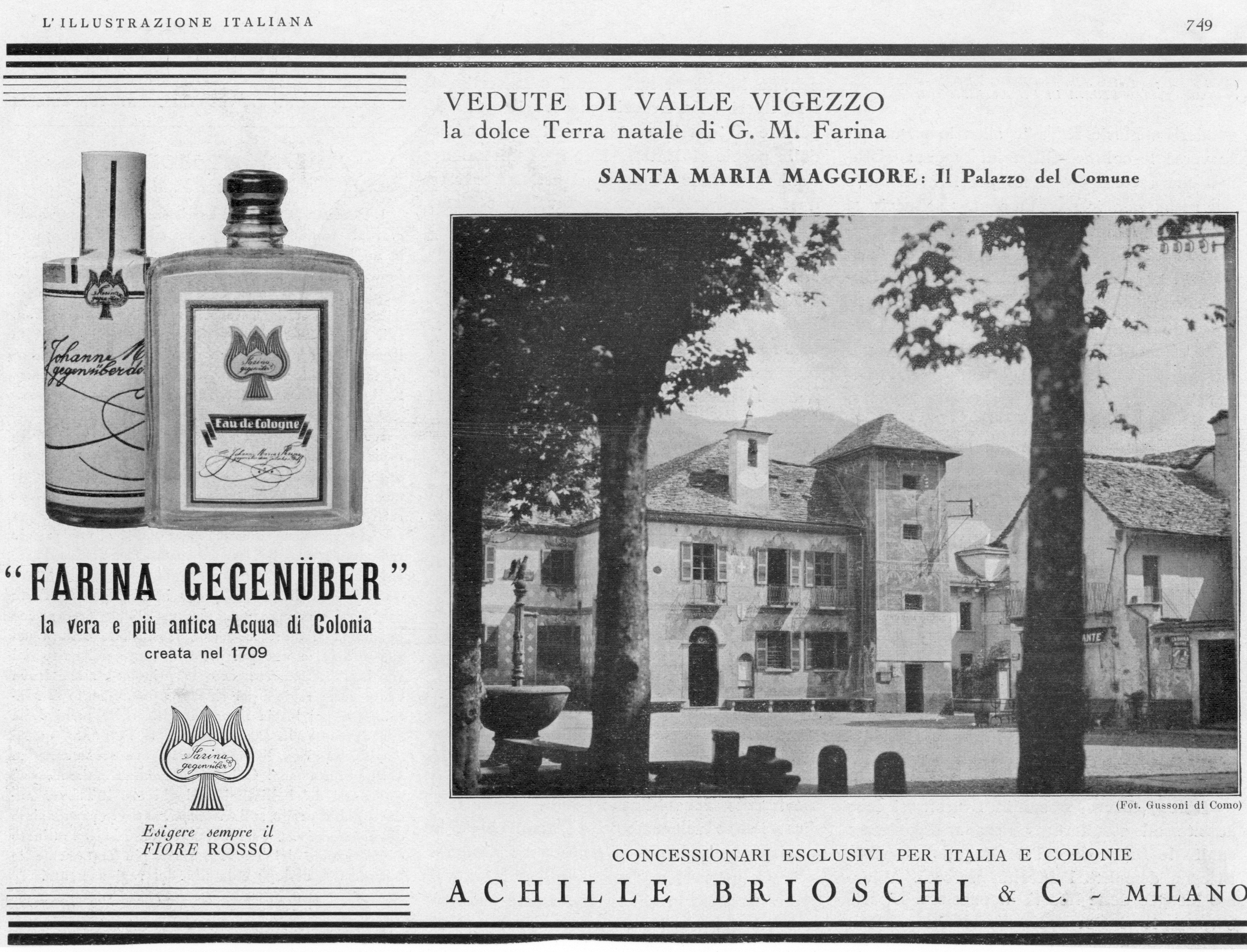
Santa Maria Maggiore 1928

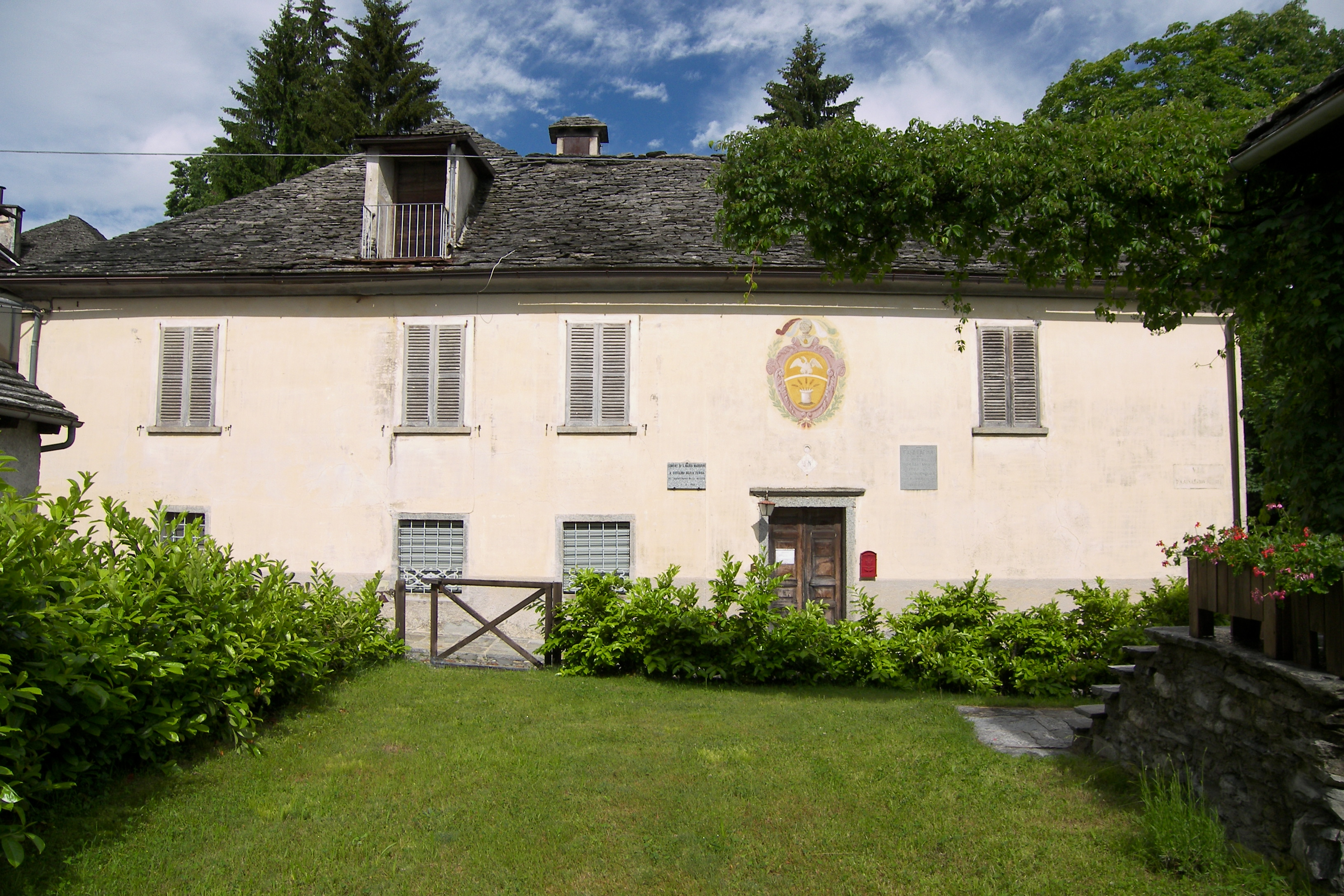
Casa Farina located in Via Gian Maria Farina

Santa Maria Maggiore borders the following municipalities: Campo (Vallemaggia) (Switzerland), Craveggia, Druogno, Malesco, Masera, Montecrestese, Toceno, Trontano, Vergeletto (Switzerland).

Santa Maria Maggiore is located on the narrow gauge Domodossola–Locarno railway, also known as the Vigezzo railway (Italian: Vigezzina) which negotiates the rugged Italian Alps terrain between Domodossola, Italy, on the east and Locarno, Switzerland, on the west. It also passes through the villages of Intragna, and Malesco.
