= Re, Piedmont =

Re
- Comune
- Comune di Re
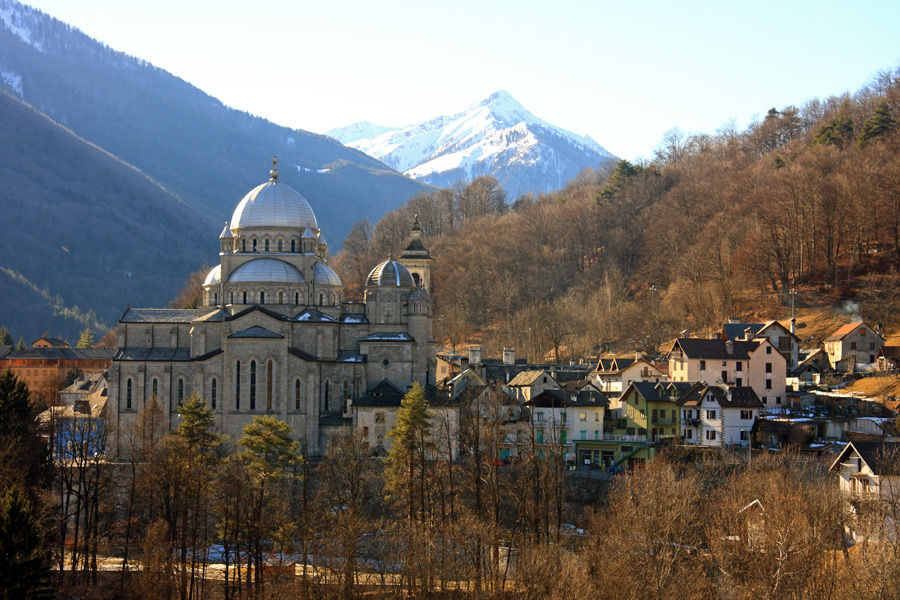
- Re

- Location within Italy Location within Piedmont
- Coordinates: 46°08′N 08°30′E
- Country: Italy
- Region: Piedmont
- Province: Verbano Cusio Ossola (VB)

Area
  - Total: 27 km^{2} (10 sq mi)

Population (2018-01-01)
  - Total: 830
  - Density: 31/km^{2} (80/sq mi)
- Time zone: UTC+1 (CET)
  - Summer (DST): UTC+2 (CEST)
- Postal code: 28030
- Website: Official website

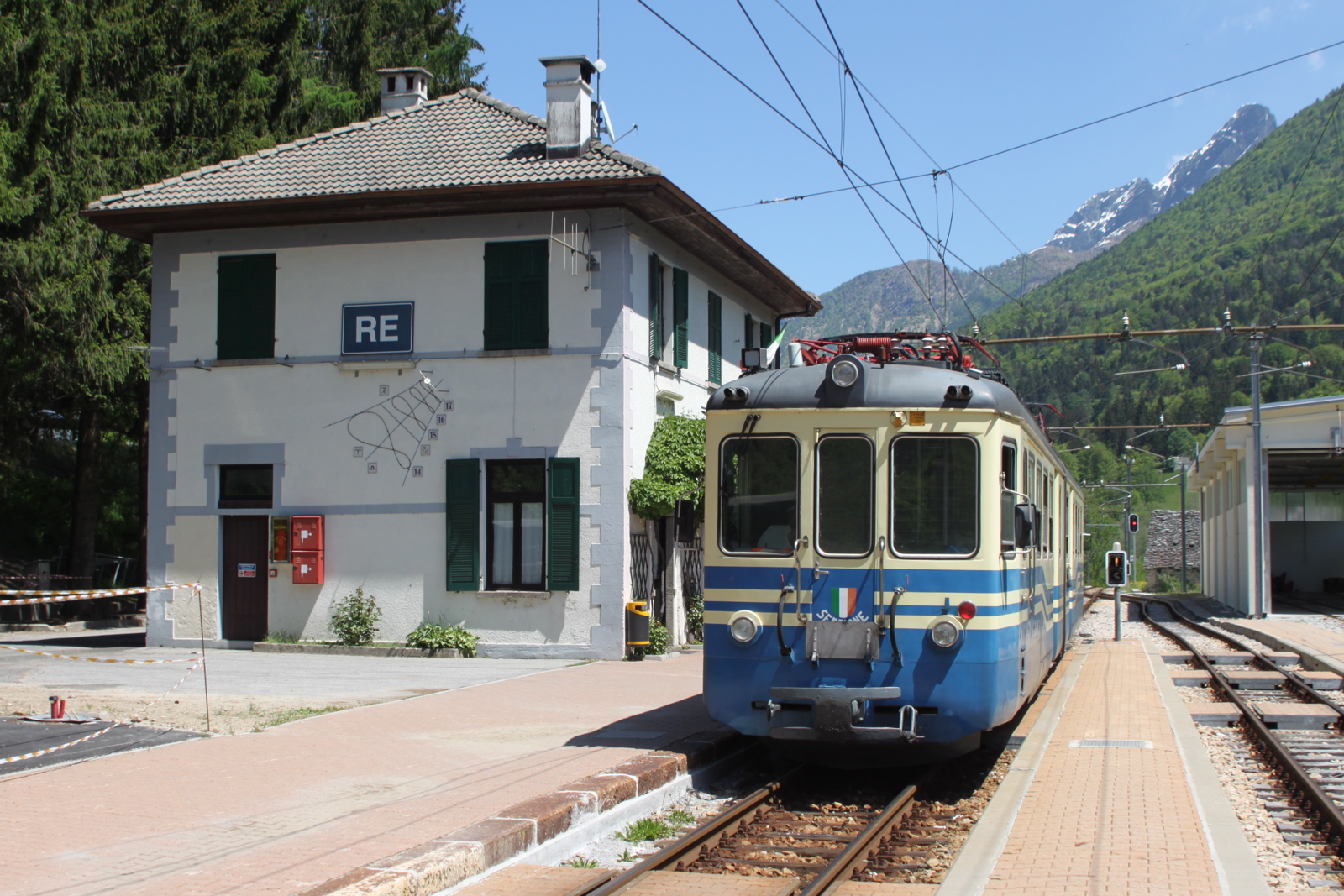
the railway station

Re (Italian pronunciation: [rɛ]) is a village and comune in the Province of Verbano-Cusio-Ossola, in the region of Piedmont, Italy, approximately 20 kilometres (12 mi) from Domodossola and 7 kilometres (4 mi) from the border with Switzerland. It is situated on the Domodossola-Locarno railway and is home to a pilgrimage church.
