= Toceno =

- Comune
- Comune di Toceno
- Coat of arms

- Location within Italy Location within Piedmont
- Coordinates: 46°8′N 8°28′E
- Country: Italy
- Region: Piedmont
- Province: Verbano-Cusio-Ossola (VB)

Government
  - Mayor: Tiziano Ferraris

Area
  - Total: 15.7 km^{2} (6.1 sq mi)
- Elevation: 907 m (2,976 ft)

Population (30 June 2009)
  - Total: 748
  - Density: 47.6/km^{2} (123/sq mi)
- Demonym: Tocenesi
- Time zone: UTC+1 (CET)
  - Summer (DST): UTC+2 (CEST)
- Postal code: 28030
- Dialing code: 0324
- Patron saint: St. Anthony the Abbot
- Saint day: 17 January

Toceno (Lombard: Zén) is a comune (municipality) in the Province of Verbano-Cusio-Ossola in the Italian region Piedmont, located about 130 kilometres (81 mi) northeast of Turin and about 25 kilometres (16 mi) north of Verbania.

Toceno borders the following municipalities: Craveggia, Santa Maria Maggiore.

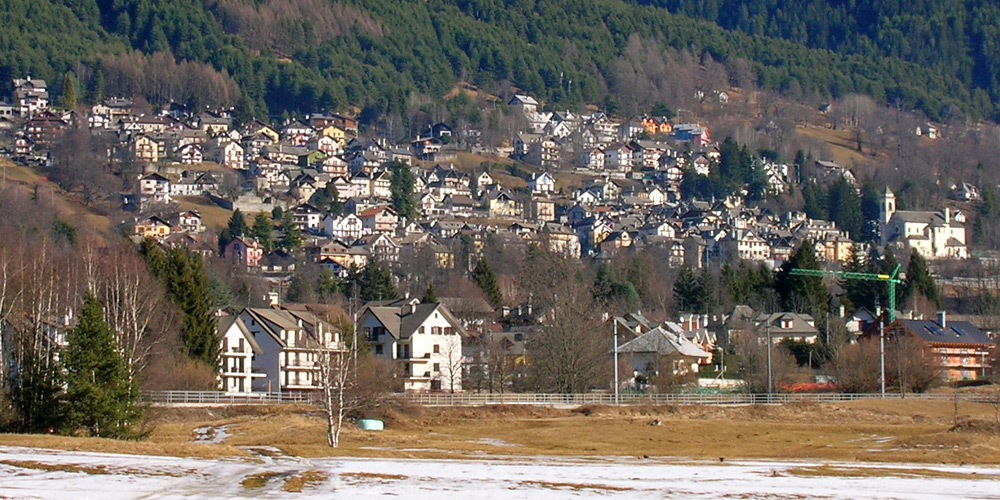
the Town of Toceno
