= Campo, Vallemaggia =

Campo
- Municipality
- Flag Coat of arms
- Location of Campo
- Location within Switzerland Location within Canton of Ticino
- Coordinates: 46°17′N 8°29′E
- Country: Switzerland
- Canton: Ticino
- District: Vallemaggia

Government
  - Mayor: Sindaco

Area
  - Total: 43.27 km^{2} (16.71 sq mi)
- Elevation: 1,321 m (4,334 ft)

Population (December 2004)
  - Total: 56
  - Density: 1.3/km^{2} (3.4/sq mi)
- Time zone: UTC+01:00 (CET)
  - Summer (DST): UTC+02:00 (CEST)
- Postal code: 6684
- SFOS number: 5307
- ISO 3166 code: CH-TI
- Surrounded by: Bosco/Gurin, Cerentino, Cevio, Maggia, Montecrestese (IT-VB), Premia (IT-VB), Santa Maria Maggiore (IT-VB), Vergeletto
- Website: www.campo-vallemaggia.ch

Campo is a municipality in the district of Vallemaggia in the canton of Ticino in Switzerland.

== History ==
In the 15th century, the Valle di Campo along with Cevio, Bignasco and Cavergno formed the Roana Superior, a kind of administrative district. Until 1513, Campo belonged to the parish of Cevio. Cimalmotto and Niva separated from Campo's church in 1767 to form an independent parish. They also formed independent political municipalities until the beginning of the 19th century. The church of S. Bernardo in Campo was probably built in the 14th century. In the first half of the 16th century, in 1620 and 1740-45 it was enlarged. It contains frescoes by Giuseppe Mattia Borgnis (1745), who also worked on the churches of Cimalmotto and Niva, the Baroque chapel of San Giovanni and the facade of Palazzi Pedrazzini.

In the 17th and 18th centuries, the lack of arable land caused a strong migratory flow toward Germany and Italy. Some of the residents, especially merchants and emigrants, became wealthy. Many of the village buildings were richly decorated with frescoes. At this time a wealthy and influential middle class emerged with political and religious power. Currently, a few families still work in agriculture. The majority of houses in the village are second homes. Even in the 18th century the area was popular as a holiday destination. Since 1850, the population has declined with many residents moving to the cities. The great distances (42 km (26 mi) from Locarno) and adverse road make it difficult for the village to become a commuter town.

The unfavorable geological conditions, exacerbated by reckless logging and resultant flooding caused numerous landslides since the beginning of the 19th century.

== Geography ==
Campo has an area, as of 1997, of 43.27 square kilometers (16.71 sq mi). Of this area, 1.07 km^{2} (0.41 sq mi) or 2.5% is used for agricultural purposes, while 19.22 km^{2} (7.42 sq mi) or 44.4% is forested. Of the rest of the land, 0.36 km^{2} (0.14 sq mi) or 0.8% is settled (buildings or roads), 0.79 km^{2} (0.31 sq mi) or 1.8% is either rivers or lakes and 17.21 km^{2} (6.64 sq mi) or 39.8% is unproductive land. Of the built up area, housing and buildings made up 0.4% and transportation infrastructure made up 0.3%. Out of the forested land, 28.0% of the total land area is heavily forested, while 10.6% is covered in small trees and shrubbery and 5.8% is covered with orchards or small clusters of trees. Of the agricultural land, 2.1% is used for growing crops. Of the water in the municipality, 0.2% is in lakes and 1.7% is in rivers and streams. Of the unproductive areas, 19.3% is unproductive vegetation and 20.5% is too rocky for vegetation.

The municipality is located in the Vallemaggia district, in the upper Valle di Campo. It consists of the villages of Campo (Mezzo), Cimalmotto (1,405 m (4,610 ft)), Piano and Niva (955 m (3,133 ft)). The villages are all geographically isolated from each other.

== Coat of arms ==
The blazon of the municipal coat of arms is Azure a fleur de lis or.

== Demographics ==
Campo has a population (as of December 2020) of 49. As of 2008, 8.8% of the population are resident foreign nationals. Over the last 10 years (1997–2007) the population has changed at a rate of -9.5%. Most of the population (as of 2000) speaks Italian language (52 or 89.7%), with German being second most common (5 or 8.6%) and English being third (1 or 1.7%). There are people who speak French and people who speak Romansh.

As of 2008, the gender distribution of the population was 55.8% male and 44.2% female. The population was made up of 27 Swiss men (51.9% of the population), and 2 (3.8%) non-Swiss men. There were 23 Swiss women (44.2%), and (0.0%) non-Swiss women. Of the population in the municipality 26 or about 44.8% were born in Campo and lived there in 2000. There were 9 or 15.5% who were born in the same canton, while 11 or 19.0% were born somewhere else in Switzerland, and 8 or 13.8% were born outside of Switzerland.

In 2008 there was 1 live birth to Swiss citizens and 1 death of a Swiss citizen. Ignoring immigration and emigration, the population of Swiss citizens remained the same while the foreign population remained the same. There was 1 Swiss woman who immigrated back to Switzerland. The total Swiss population remained the same in 2008 and the non-Swiss population remained the same. This represents a population growth rate of 0.0%.

The age distribution, as of 2009, in Campo is; 1 child is between 0 and 9 years old and 1 teenager is between 10 and 19. Of the adult population, 4 people or 7.7% of the population are between 20 and 29 years old. 9 people or 17.3% are between 30 and 39, 7 people or 13.5% are between 40 and 49, and 10 people or 19.2% are between 50 and 59. The senior population distribution is 7 people or 13.5% of the population are between 60 and 69 years old, 1 person is between 70 and 79, there are 12 people or 23.1% who are over 80.

As of 2000, there were 33 people who were single and never married in the municipality. There were 19 married individuals, 1 widow or widower and 5 individuals who are divorced.

As of 2000, there were 30 private households in the municipality, and an average of 1.9 persons per household. There were 13 households that consist of only one person and 2 households with five or more people. Out of a total of 30 households that answered this question, 43.3% were households made up of just one person. Of the rest of the households, there are 8 married couples without children, 3 married couples with children There were 6 households that were made up unrelated people.

In 2000 there were 185 single family homes (or 93.4% of the total) out of a total of 198 inhabited buildings. There were 5 multi-family buildings (2.5%) and 8 other use buildings (commercial or industrial) that also had some housing (4.0%). Of the single family homes 21 were built before 1919, while 1 was built between 1990 and 2000. The greatest number of single family homes (102) were built between 1919 and 1945.

In 2000 there were 202 apartments in the municipality. The most common apartment size was 4 rooms of which there were 41. There were 14 single room apartments and 71 apartments with five or more rooms. Of these apartments, a total of 30 apartments (14.9% of the total) were permanently occupied, while 171 apartments (84.7%) were seasonally occupied and 1 apartment (0.5%) was empty. As of 2007, the construction rate of new housing units was 17.5 new units per 1000 residents. The vacancy rate for the municipality, in 2008, was 0%.

The historical population is given in the following chart:

== Heritage sites of national significance ==
The Case Pedrazzini and Oratory of S. Giovanni Battista and the Parish Church of S. Bernardo with Via Crucis are listed as Swiss heritage site of national significance. The entire villages of Campo and Cimalmotto are part of the Inventory of Swiss Heritage Sites.

== Politics ==
In the 2007 federal election the most popular party was the CVP which received 30.77% of the vote. The next three most popular parties were the SP (24.52%), the FDP (19.71%) and the SVP (9.62%). In the federal election, a total of 26 votes were cast, and the voter turnout was 51.0%.

In the 2007 Gran Consiglio election, there were a total of 53 registered voters in Campo, of which 37 or 69.8% voted. 1 blank ballot was cast, leaving 36 valid ballots in the election. The most popular party was the PPD+GenGiova which received 11 or 30.6% of the vote. The next three most popular parties were; the SSI (with 8 or 22.2%), the PS (with 6 or 16.7%) and the PLRT (with 3 or 8.3%).

In the 2007 Consiglio di Stato election, 1 blank ballot was cast, leaving 36 valid ballots in the election. The most popular party was the PPD which received 11 or 30.6% of the vote. The next three most popular parties were; the PS (with 10 or 27.8%), the SSI (with 8 or 22.2%) and the PLRT (with 3 or 8.3%).

== Economy ==
As of 2007, Campo had an unemployment rate of 1.19%. As of 2005, there were 8 people employed in the primary economic sector and about 3 businesses involved in this sector. 2 people were employed in the tertiary sector, with 1 business in this sector. There were 27 residents of the municipality who were employed in some capacity, of which females made up 33.3% of the workforce.

In 2008 the total number of full-time equivalent jobs was 6. The number of jobs in the primary sector was 5, all of which were in agriculture. There were no jobs in the secondary sector. The number of jobs in the tertiary sector was 1 in a hotel or restaurant.

In 2000, there were 8 workers who commuted away from the municipality. Of the working population, 0% used public transportation to get to work, and 33.3% used a private car.

As of 2009, there was one hotel in Campo.

== Religion ==
From the 2000 census, 47 or 81.0% were Roman Catholic, while 5 or 8.6% belonged to the Swiss Reformed Church. There were 3 (or about 5.17% of the population) belonged to no church, are agnostic or atheist, and 3 individuals (or about 5.17% of the population) did not answer the question.

== Education ==
In Campo about 14 or (24.1%) of the population have completed non-mandatory upper secondary education, and 7 or (12.1%) have completed additional higher education (either university or a Fachhochschule). Of the 7 who completed tertiary schooling, 71.4% were Swiss men, 14.3% were Swiss women.

In Campo there were a total of 2 students (as of 2009). The Ticino education system provides up to three years of non-mandatory kindergarten but in Campo there were no children in kindergarten, primary school or the lower secondary school system.

The upper secondary school includes several options, but at the end of the upper secondary program, a student will be prepared to enter a trade or to continue on to a university or college. In Ticino, vocational students may either attend school while working on their internship or apprenticeship (which takes three or four years) or may attend school followed by an internship or apprenticeship (which takes one year as a full-time student or one and a half to two years as a part-time student). There were no vocational students who were attending school full-time and 1 who attend part-time.

The professional program lasts three years and prepares a student for a job in engineering, nursing, computer science, business, tourism and similar fields. There was 1 student in the professional program.

As of 2000, there was 1 student from Campo who attended a school outside the municipality.
