= Valle Verzasca =

Valley in Switzerland

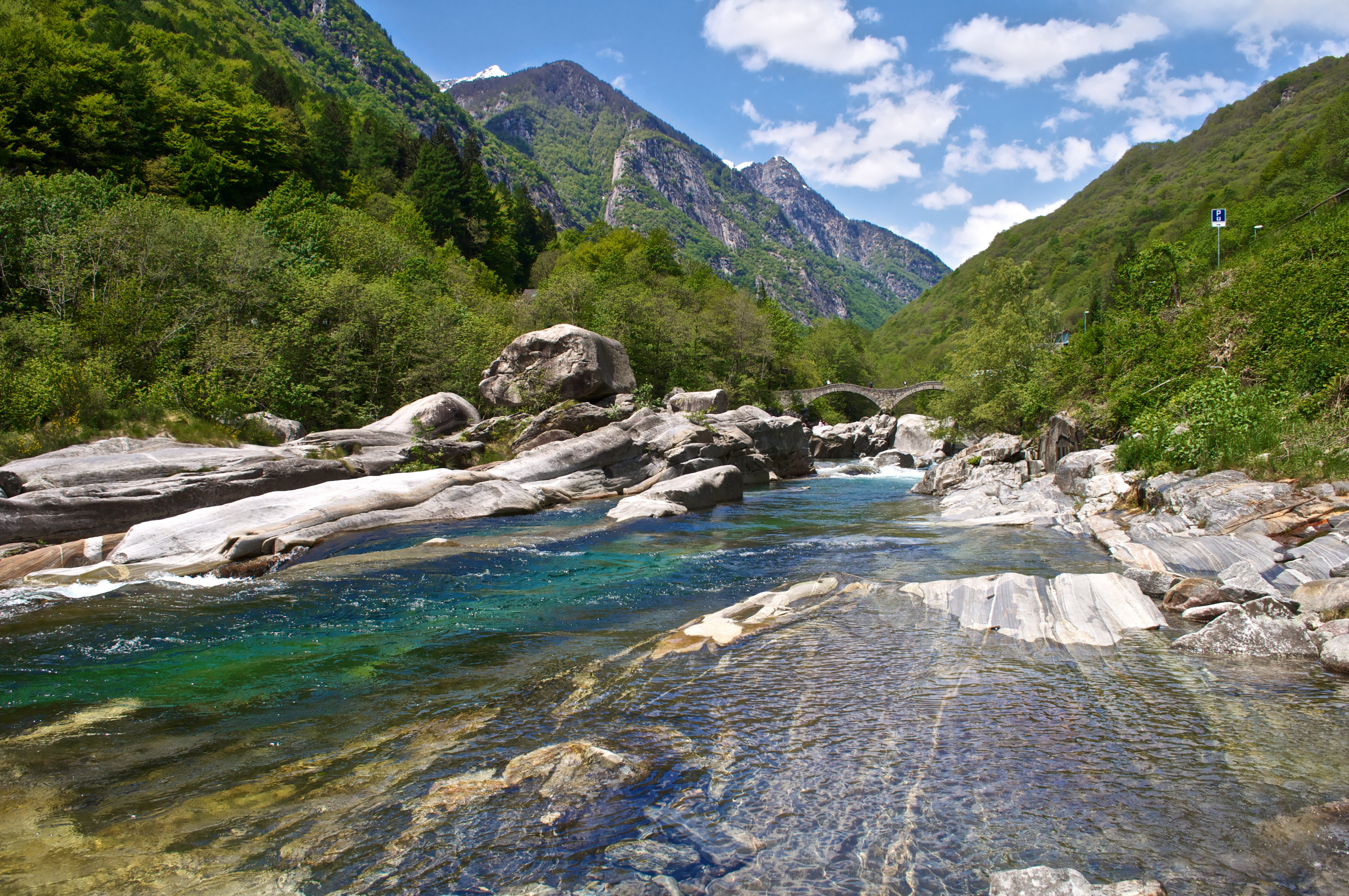
The Valle Verzasca (here at Lavertezzo) is drained by the Verzasca

The Valle Verzasca is a valley in the Locarno District of the canton of Ticino, Switzerland. It comprises the municipalities of Mergoscia, Vogorno, Corippo, Lavertezzo, Brione, Gerra, Frasco, and Sonogno. As of 2004, the total population is 3,200. It is the most central valley of Ticino, and none of the passes out of the valley cross cantonal or national borders. The valley is formed by the river Verzasca and is situated between the Leventina and the Maggia and culminates at Pizzo Barone.

== Geography ==
Located between the Leventina and the Valle Maggia valleys, Valle Verzasca extends over a length of 25 kilometres (16 mi) in north–south direction and is situated in the north of the Lago Maggiore. The valley floor is at about 500 metres (1,640 ft) to 900 metres (2,953 ft) above sea level. The surrounding mountain passes respectively have an average altitude of 2,400 metres (7,874 ft). The valley is crossed by the Verzasca which is dammed at the southernly outlet of the valley, forming the Lago di Vogorno, before it flows in the Magadino plain in the vicinity of the Ticino in the Lago Maggiore.

The Valle Verzasca includes the geographical centre of Ticino, which is located at Mergoscia, near the lower end of the valley.

=== Climate ===
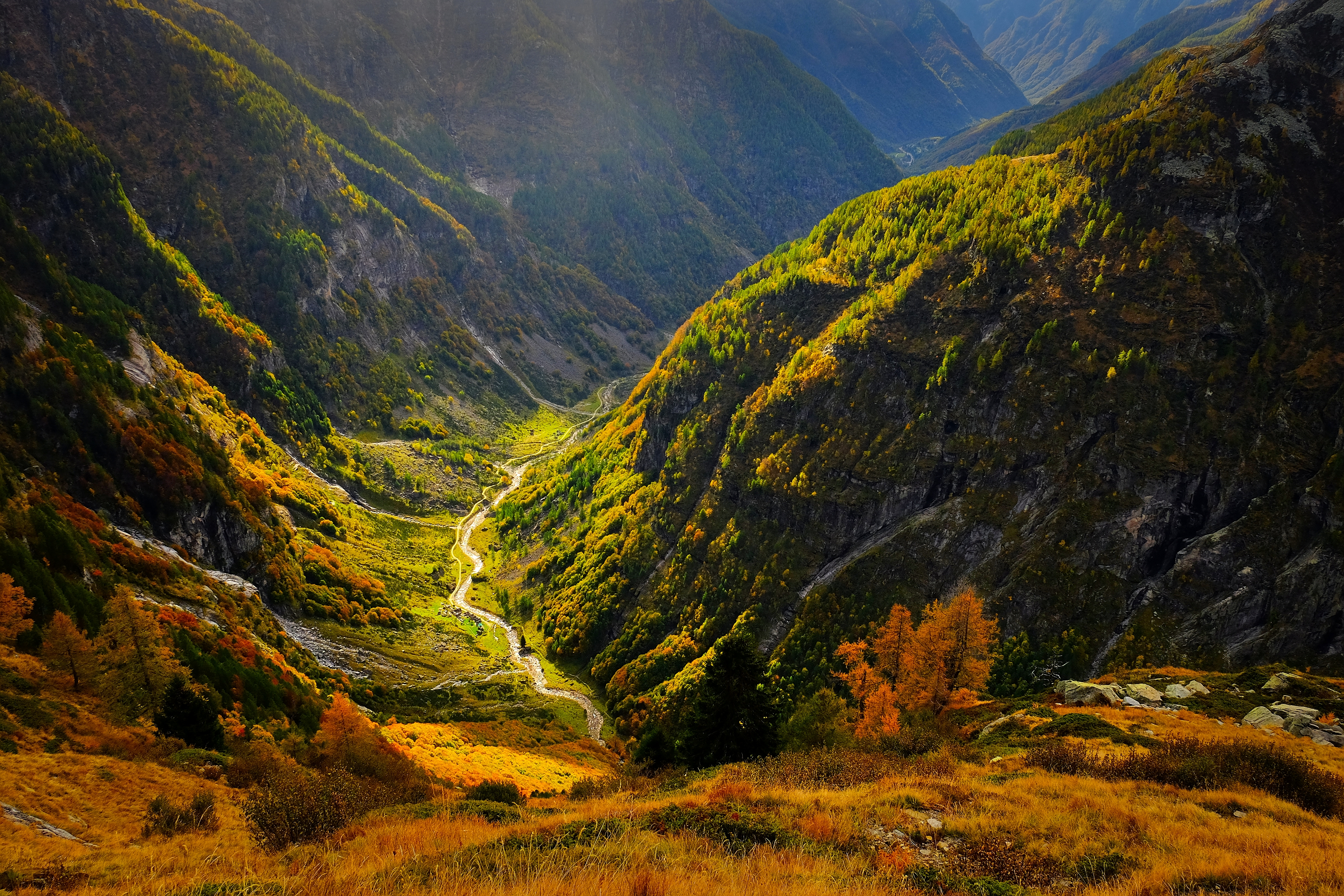
Mixed coniferous forests in the upper valley (Cabiòi)

Due to the different altitudes, all climate zones are combined in the Valle Verzasca. Tenero-contra and Gordola include the insubric climate region thanks to the deep-sea level, close to the Lago Maggiore and protected by the mountains from the north winds. Vineyards and Mediterranean vegetation benefit from the mildest climate area of Switzerland, nebulae are rare and rainfall of short duration. With increasing altitude, the hills and mountain climate goes over to regions dominated by the Alpine climate (over 2,000 metres (6,562 ft)).

=== Flora and fauna ===
The diversity benefits among other things, the cultivation of vines, and it flourish chestnut forests and palm trees thrive. Due to differences in soil type and amounts, almost all flora occurring in the Ticino and fauna of the various environmental zones are found in the Verzasca Valley.

The Romans introduced and comparable to the tropical wood species, Castanea sativa is in the southern part of the valley, below 1,000 metres (3,281 ft), the dominant species. It is no longer actively cultivated, but favors the further diffusion, and studies suggest taking advantage of the valuable wood of chestnut as a valuable wood.

In the Valle Verzasca the endemic Nera Verzasca goat has been preserved, which looks very much like the ancient Roman goat. This medieval durable goat has short hair, because it's not stuck in the snow.

== Culture ==
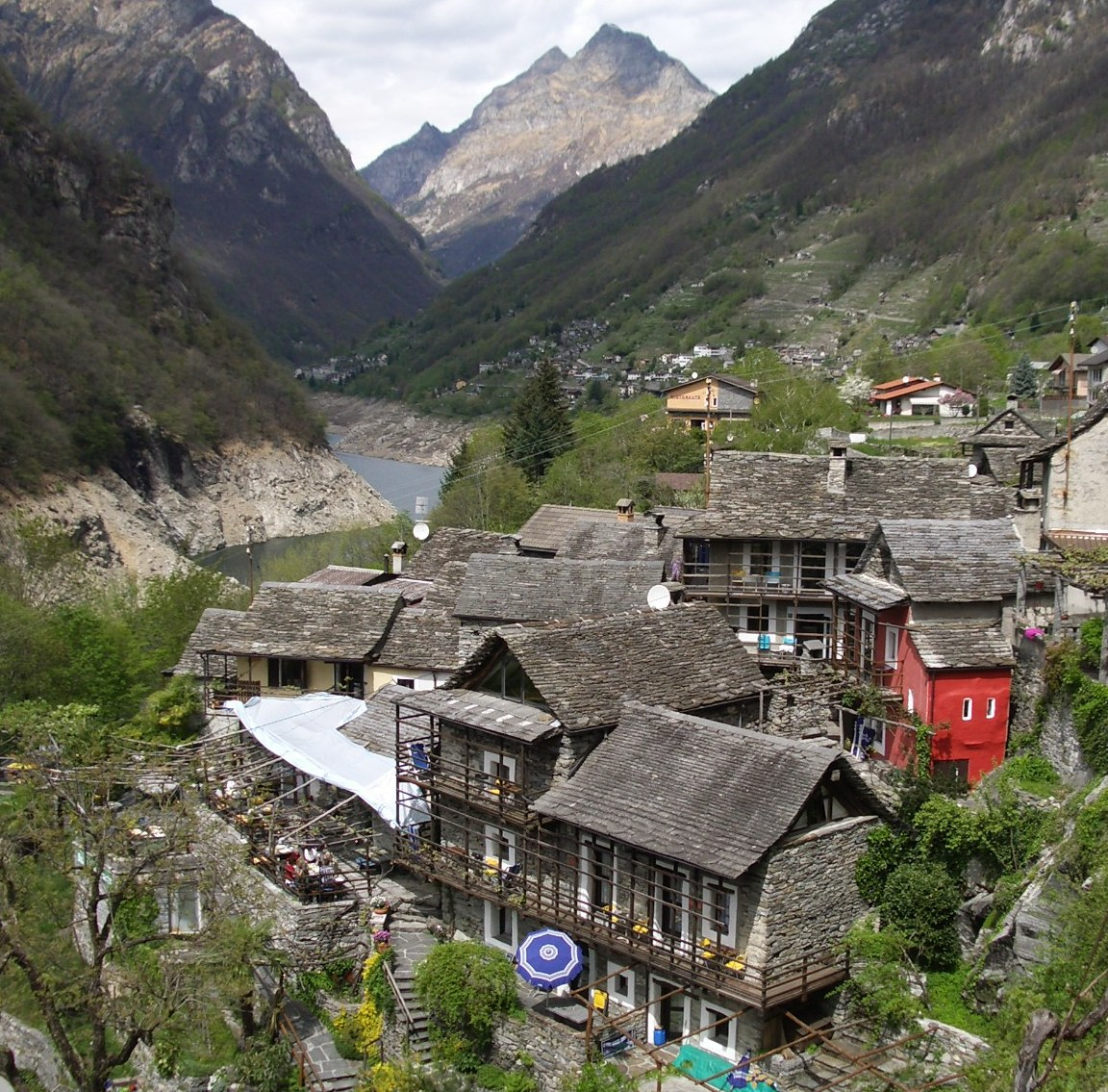
Rustici in Berzona/Vogorno

Due to its isolated location, the Verzasca Valley is claimed as one of the valleys that could best keep its originality. The secluded geographical location made it unattractive for conquerors since the Roman period, and even before. The first traces of settlement in the area are from the early 2nd millennium BC, in its southern part. In Berzona, a locality (frazione) of Vogorno, a carved rock known as a Sass di Striöi (literally: witches stone) is situated on a hiking trail. The shell rock most likely dates from around 600–700 BC; there are about 90 such carved rocks in the Verzasca Valley. Although initially free farmers, the valley was alternately ruled by the Swiss Confederacy, Savoy, Leventia and the Rusca family from about 1410 onwards. In the European Middle Ages, the population were mainly farmers, and since the early 17th century, many residents had to leave for seasonal labour outside their home valley. Often unemployed young men were recruited as mercenaries for foreign armies. In two quarries granite is mined by local workers.

The so-called Rustici (Italian for farm house) in grey stone, with white borders on the windows and heavy stone roofs, are typical houses in the valley. Wood rafters are used to support the heavy stone roof, Castanea sativa wood. Many chapels along the way bear witness to the deep faith of the inhabitants of the valley. Valle Vercasza was the origin of many of the region's so-called Spazzacamini (literally: chimney sweep children).

== Tourism ==
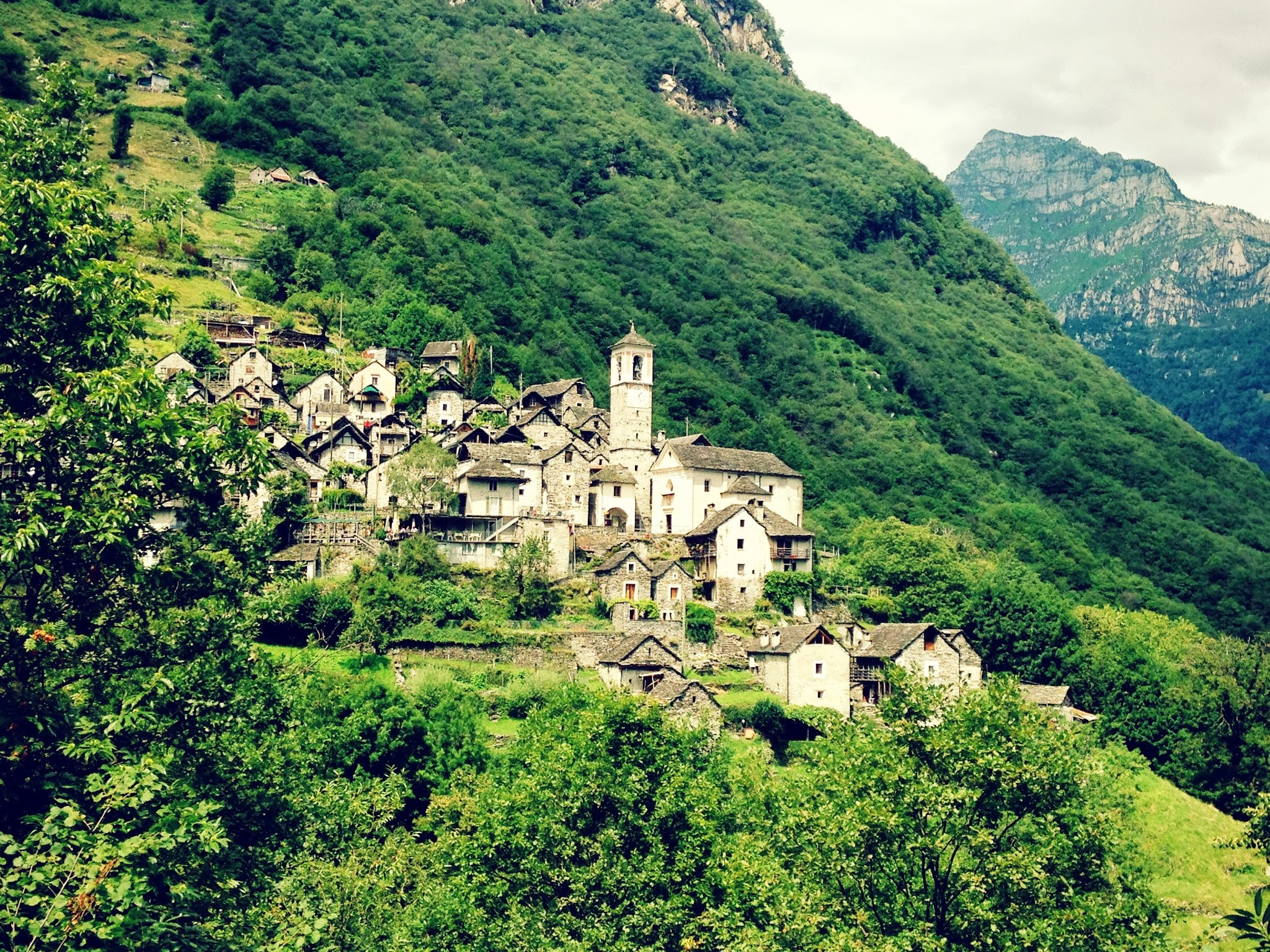
Corippo, Switzerland's smallest municipality

With the connection to the public transport, tourism developed from the end of the 19th century, but the majority of young people from the Valley still look for income opportunities in wealthier regions of Switzerland or northern Italy. Currently the majority of locals are active in the tourism trade. The conversion of the old Rustici houses into holiday houses created jobs, increased tourism revenues and ensured that the old houses and the characteristic image of the Verzasca Valley are preserved.

The mountaintop with views of the Valais, Bernese, Glarus and Grisons Alps, as well as the many transitions in the side and neighbouring valleys are popular to mountain hikers, and around a dozen mountain huts provide accommodation and meals. The Verzasca is popular to canoeists and divers, but considered to be dangerous and difficult. The Verzasca Dam is also well known for its 220 m height jump, which is one of the highest jumps in the world and also the most famous bungy jump, as it was used in the James Bond film GoldenEye.

== Transportation ==
The only valley access for road traffic and the Postauto buses are bounded from Tenero or Gordola. The starting on the left side of the valley road (built from 1866 to 1871) crosses Vogorno, Corippo, Lavertezzo, Brione (Verzasca), Gerra (Verzasca), Frasco and ends in Sonogno; a short road leads to Corippo. On the right side of the valley, the road and post road trips from Locarno ends in Mergoscia.

== Passes ==
name	elev. (m)	coordinates	from	to
left				
Ruscada, Passo di	2069	715.040/121.010	Vogorno > Cap.Borgna	Cugnasco, Sementina (Magadinoebene)
Medee, Bocchetta di	2149	715.230/121.290	Vogorno > Cap.Borgna	Preonzo (Valle Leventina)
Cazzane, Bocchetta	2104	714.730/121.520	Vogorno > Cap.Borgna	Preonzo, Moleno (Valle Leventina)
Rognoi, Bocchetta di	2219	713.450/121.820	Lavertezzo	Vogorno
Rierna, Bocchetta di	2295	710.960/130.210	Lavertezzo	Personico (Valle Leventina)
Gana, Butta della	2207	709.200/132.630	Frasco	Personico (Valle Leventina)
Corte Nuovo, Passo di	2431	708.980/131.010	Gerra	Personico (Valle Leventina)
Gagnone, Passo del	2217	708.710/132.070	Frasco > Cap.d'Efra	Personico (Valle Leventina)
Curtin, Passo del	2242	708.550/131.940	Frasco > Cap.d'Efra	Personico (Valle Leventina)
Piatto, Passo di	2108	704.650/138.540	Sonogno	Chironico (Valle Leventina)
Barone, Passo	2274	701.360/139.940	Sonogno	Chironico (Valle Leventina)
Motto, Bassa di	2274	707.870/130.140	Lavertezzo	Gerra
right:				
Lupo, Passo del	2017	704.870/120.360	Corippo Mergoscia	Gordevio (Valle Maggia)
Orgnana, Bocchetta di	1950	704.650/121.980	Lavertezzo	Gordevio (Valle Maggia)
Nimi, Passo di	2048	703.060/123.290	Brione > Cap. Alpe	Gordevio (Valle Maggia)
Deva, Passo	2036	702.710/125.390	Brione	Maggia (Valle Maggia)
Canova, Bocchetta	2226	696.050/130.780	Brione	Giumaglio (Valle Maggia)
Pini, Bocchetta dei	2198	696.630/132.880	Brione	Menzonio (Val Lavizzara)
Cocco, Passo del	2142	696.510/132.620	Brione	Menzonio (Val Lavizzara)
Mügaia, Bocchetta di	2518	698.230/134.090	Brione	Sonogno
Ciossa	2373	700.480/132.110	Brione > Val d'Osura	Sognono
Redorta, Passo di	2181	699.010/135.850	Sonogno	Prato-Sornico (Val Lavizzara)

== Literature ==
- Giuseppina Togni: Il prete rosso - Geschichte der Val Verzasca, Armando Dadò Editore, 2012, ISBN 978-88-8281-336-9.
- Elfi Rüsch: Distretto di Locarno IV. Gesellschaft für Schweizerische Kunstgeschichte, Bern 2013, ISBN 978-3-03797-084-3.
