= Verzasca, Switzerland =

Verzasca
- Municipality
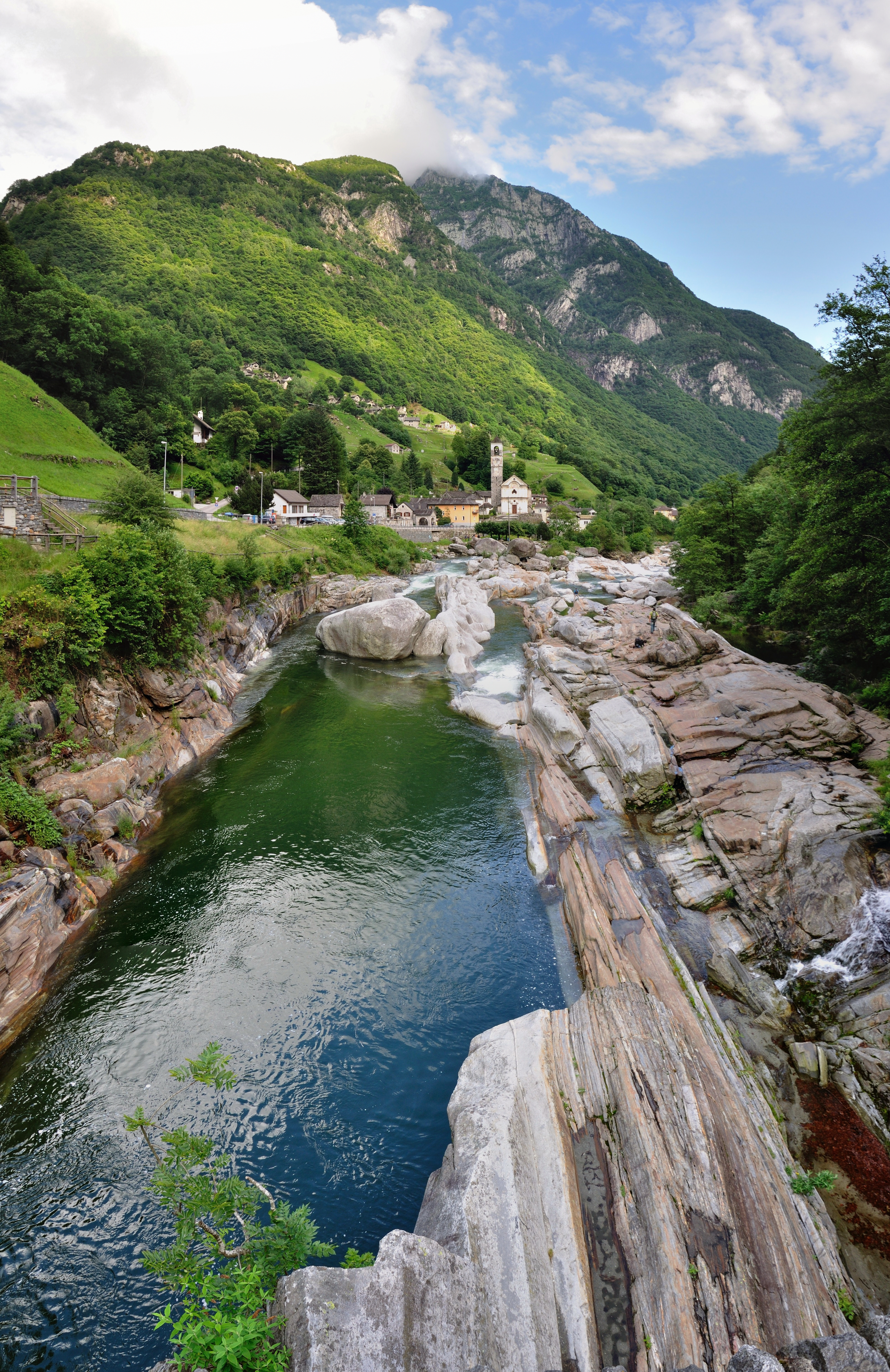
- View of the Verzasca at the village of Lavertezzo.

- Flag Coat of arms
- Location of Verzasca
- Location within Switzerland Location within Canton of Ticino
- Coordinates: 46°13′16″N 8°51′36″E
- Country: Switzerland
- Canton: Ticino
- District: Locarno

Area
  - Total: 143.59 km^{2} (55.44 sq mi)
- Elevation: 461 m (1,512 ft)

Population (2020)
  - Total: 799
  - Density: 5.56/km^{2} (14.4/sq mi)
- Time zone: UTC+01:00 (CET)
  - Summer (DST): UTC+02:00 (CEST)
- Postal codes: 6631 Corippo; 6632 Vogorno; 6634 Brione; 6635 Frasco; 6637 Sonogno
- SFOS number: 5399
- ISO 3166 code: CH-TI
- Surrounded by: Cevio, Avegno Gordevio, Lavizzara
- Website: https://www.verzasca.swiss

Verzasca is a municipality in the district of Locarno in the canton of Ticino in Switzerland.

On 17 October 2020 the former municipalities of Vogorno, Sonogno, Corippo, Brione (Verzasca) and Frasco merged to form the new municipality of Verzasca.

== History ==
Following a vote organized on 10 June 2018 in seven municipalities of the Valle Verzasca, the municipality was to be officially created on 5 April 2020 by the merger of seven municipalities of the Valle Verzasca, namely Brione, Corippo, Frasco, Lavertezzo Valle (locality of Lavertezzo), Sonogno, Vogorno and Gerra Valle (locality of Cugnasco-Gerra). The creation of the municipality was delayed until 17 October 2020.

=== Corippo ===
Corippo is first mentioned in 1224 as Culipo. In 1374 it was mentioned as Quorippo.

=== Brione ===
Aerial view of Brione(1953)

During the Middle Ages it was part of a squadra in the community of Verzasca. Later, it formed a Vicinanza together with Gerra. In 1852 they both became independent municipalities. As one of the main towns of the upper valley, it and Vogorno alternately presented the candidates for the offices of Podestà and governor. The Castello Marcacci was built in Brione in the 17th century and was the summer residence of a traditional Podesta family, the Marcacci.

The Church of Beata Vergine Assunta (expanded in the 17th century and restored in the 19th century) stands on the remains of a chapel from 1295 and contains frescoes from the 14th (Giotto school in Rimini) and the 15th centuries. The parish separated from Vogorno before 1518. In 1644, it established a fund to support a school and chaplain.

The local economy was built mainly around agriculture and grazing. The seasonal migration is well documented since 1600. Since the 14th century many of the residents have spent their winters with their cattle in the Magadino valley.

=== Frasco ===
Frasco is first mentioned in 1235 as Felasco. During the Middle Ages, Frasco was part of the greater Vicinanza of Verzasca. In 1395, it and Sonogno formed a single political municipality, which existed until 1843. The village church of St. Bernhard was probably built in the 14th century. The present church dates from 1868 to 1869 and stands on the foundations of the old building. In 1518 Frasco and Sonogno separated from the parish of Vogorno and formed their own parish, which lasted until it divided again in 1734. For centuries, the inhabitants lived on agriculture and alpine seasonal migrations with livestock. Starting in 1870, the Val d'Efra, a vein of white marble, was exploited for limestone quarries. In 2000, the agricultural sector was the only sector providing jobs in Frasco, while about two-thirds of the workers were commuters. In the hamlet of Piede della Motta, there are frescoes from the 15th century. All of the old settlement areas of the municipality are now protected as historical buildings. More recently, however, many houses have been built in the municipality.

=== Sonogno ===
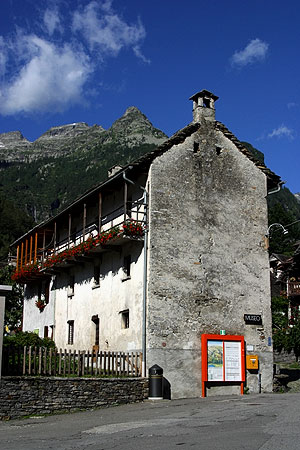
Museum of Verzasca in Sonogno

Sonogno is first mentioned in 1200 as Sornono. In 1417 it was mentioned as Senognio. During the Middle Ages, Sonogno was part of the Vicinanza of Verzasca and shared the fate of the valley. From 1395 to 1843, it formed a single community with Frasco.

It was part of the parish of Vogorno until 1519, when it formed a parish with Frasco. It formed an independent parish in 1734. The parish church of St. Maria Loreto, is first documented in 1519. It was rebuilt in 1854 and decorated with paintings by Cherubino Patà.

The local economy was based mostly on grazing. During the summer, the cattle grazed in the high alpine pastures, in the winter the cows were moved to their winter pastures in the Magadino. Due to limited jobs, many of the residents emigrated and after about 1850, many went overseas. Decedents of residents of Sonogno can be found in nearly 40 different countries. The more recent exodus to urban centers, combined with emigration have caused a steady decline of population since the mid-nineteenth century. The Museum of Verzasca was built in Sonogno in 1974. In 2005 the agricultural sector still offered 47% of jobs in the municipality.

== Geography ==
After the merger, Verzasca has an area, (as of the 2004/09 survey), of 143.59 km^{2} (55.44 sq mi).

== Demographics ==
The new municipality has a population (as of December 2020) of 799.

== Historic population ==
The historical population is given in the following chart:

== Sights ==
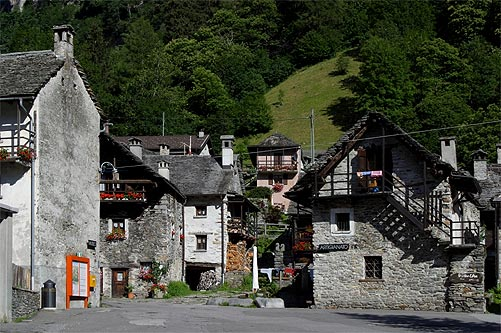
Village of Sonogno

The entire villages of Corippo, Brione (Verzasca) and Sonogno are designated as part of the Inventory of Swiss Heritage Sites.
