= Sonogno =

- Former municipality
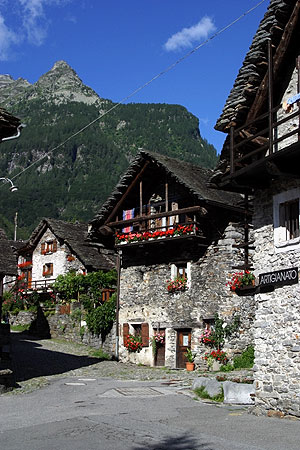

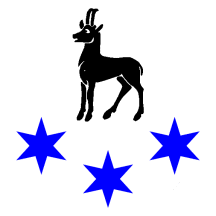
- Flag Coat of arms
- Location of Sonogno
- Location within Switzerland Location within Canton of Ticino
- Coordinates: 46°21′N 8°47′E
- Country: Switzerland
- Canton: Ticino
- District: Locarno

Government
  - Mayor: Sindaco

Area
  - Total: 37.52 km^{2} (14.49 sq mi)
- Elevation: 919 m (3,015 ft)

Population (December 2019)
  - Total: 82
  - Density: 2.2/km^{2} (5.7/sq mi)
- Time zone: UTC+01:00 (CET)
  - Summer (DST): UTC+02:00 (CEST)
- Postal code: 6637
- SFOS number: 5129
- ISO 3166 code: CH-TI
- Surrounded by: Brione (Verzasca), Chironico, Frasco, Gerra (Verzasca), Lavizzara
- Website: www.sonogno.ch

Sonogno is a village and former municipality in the district of Locarno in the canton of Ticino in Switzerland. It is located in Valle Verzasca. On 17 October 2020 the former municipalities of Vogorno, Sonogno, Corippo, Brione (Verzasca) and Frasco merged to form the new municipality of Verzasca.

== History ==
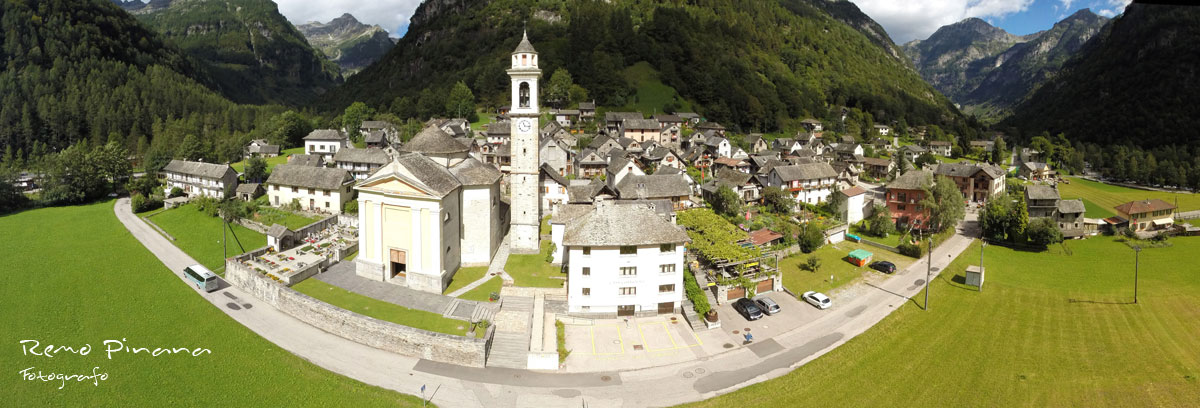
Aerial view of the village

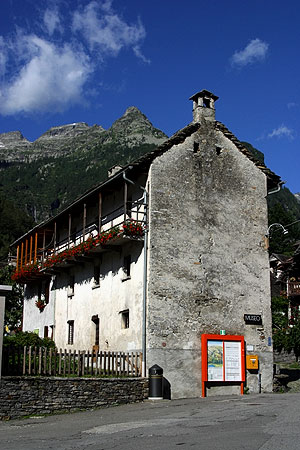
Museum of Verzasca in Sonogno

Sonogno is first mentioned in 1200, as Sornono. In 1417 it was mentioned as Senognio. During the Middle Ages, Sonogno was part of the Vicinanza of Verzasca and shared the fate of the valley. From 1395 to 1843, it formed a single community with Frasco.

It was part of the parish of Vogorno until 1519, when it formed a parish with Frasco. It formed an independent parish in 1734. The parish church of St. Maria Loreto, is first documented in 1519. It was rebuilt in 1854 and decorated with paintings by Cherubino Patà.

The local economy was based mostly on grazing. During the summer, the cattle grazed in the high alpine pastures, in the winter the cows were moved to their winter pastures in the Magadino. Due to limited jobs, many of the residents emigrated and after about 1850, many went overseas. Decedents of residents of Sonogno can be found in nearly 40 different countries. The more recent exodus to urban centers, combined with emigration have caused a steady decline of population since the mid-nineteenth century. The Museum of Verzasca was built in Sonogno in 1974. In 2005 the agricultural sector still offered 47% of jobs in the municipality.

== Geography ==
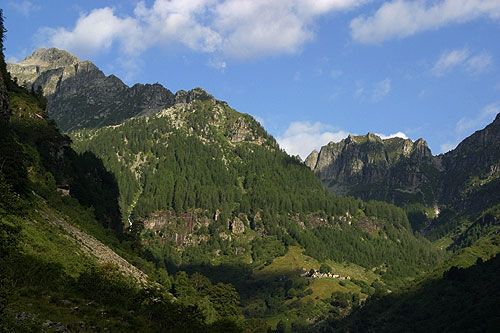
Sonogno in the Val Redòrta

Sonogno has an area of 37.5 square kilometers (14.5 sq mi). Of this area, 1% is settled (buildings or roads), 1% is used for agricultural purposes, 2% are rivers and lakes, 28% is forested, and 68% is unproductive land.

The village is located in the Locarno district, Sonogno is the last village on the paved road through the Valley Verzasca. All motor vehicles are required to park at the entrance to the village. It is located at an elevation of 918 m (3,012 ft) about 30 km (19 mi) from Locarno.

== Coat of arms ==
The blazon of the municipal coat of arms is Argent a chamois sable statant and in base three mullets azure, two and one.

== Demographics ==
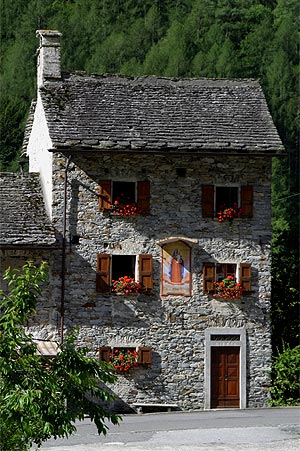
Traditional stone house in Sonogno

Sonogno had a population (as of 2019) of 82. As of 2008, 4.7% of the population are resident foreign nationals. Over the last 10 years (1997–2007) the population has changed at a rate of -15%.

Most of the population (as of 2000) speaks Italian (93.0%), with German being second most common (2.3%) and French being third (2.3%). Of the Swiss national languages (as of 2000), 2 speak German, 2 people speak French, 80 people speak Italian. The remainder (2 people) speak another language.

As of 2008, the gender distribution of the population was 49.4% male and 50.6% female. The population was made up of 43 Swiss men (48.3% of the population), and 1 (1.1%) non-Swiss man. There were 41 Swiss women (46.1%), and 4 (4.5%) non-Swiss women.

In 2008, the ratio of births was one live birth of Swiss citizens to one live birth of non-Swiss citizens. In same time span, there were an average of two deaths of Swiss citizens. Ignoring immigration and emigration, the population of Swiss citizens decreased by 1 while the foreign population increased by 1. The total Swiss population change in 2008 (from all sources, including moves across municipal borders) was a decrease of 2 and the non-Swiss population change was an increase of 2 people. This represents a population growth rate of 0.0%.

The age distribution, as of 2009, in Sonogno is; 7 children or 7.9% of the population are between 0 and 9 years old and 5 teenagers or 5.6% are between 10 and 19. Of the adult population, 3 people or 3.4% of the population are between 20 and 29 years old. 11 people or 12.4% are between 30 and 39, 19 people or 21.3% are between 40 and 49, and 13 people or 14.6% are between 50 and 59. The senior population distribution is 16 people or 18.0% of the population are between 60 and 69 years old, 10 people or 11.2% are between 70 and 79, there are 5 people or 5.6% who are over 80.

As of 2000, there were 38 private households in the municipality, and an average of 2.2 persons per household. In 2000 there were 127 single family homes (or 86.4% of the total) out of a total of 147 inhabited buildings. There were 10 two family buildings (6.8%) and 3 multi-family buildings (2.0%). There were also 7 buildings in the municipality that were multipurpose buildings (used for both housing and commercial or another purpose). The vacancy rate for the municipality, in 2008, was 0%. In 2000 there were 159 apartments in the municipality. The most common apartment size was the 3 room apartment of which there were 53. There were 18 single room apartments and 25 apartments with five or more rooms. Of these apartments, a total of 38 apartments (23.9% of the total) were permanently occupied, while 120 apartments (75.5%) were seasonally occupied and 1 apartments (0.6%) were empty. As of 2007, the construction rate of new housing units was 0 new units per 1000 residents.

The historical population is given in the following table:

year	population
1596	c. 40 hearths
1734	c. 70
1850	334
1900	293
1950	151
2000	86

== Sights ==
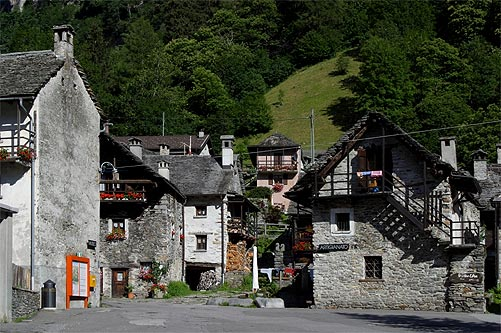
Village of Sonogno

The entire village of Sonogno is designated as part of the Inventory of Swiss Heritage Sites.

== Politics ==
In the 2007 federal election the most popular party was the CVP which received 28.16% of the vote. The next three most popular parties were the SP (26.21%), the FDP (16.99%) and the Ticino League (11.65%). In the federal election, a total of 26 votes were cast, and the voter turnout was 28.9%.

In the 2007 Gran Consiglio election, there were a total of 89 registered voters in Sonogno, of which 51 or 57.3% voted. 2 blank ballots were cast, leaving 49 valid ballots in the election. The most popular party was the SSI which received 14 or 28.6% of the vote. The next three most popular parties were; the PPD+GenGiova (with 12 or 24.5%), the LEGA (with 10 or 20.4%) and the PS (with 6 or 12.2%).

In the 2007 Consiglio di Stato election, the most popular party was the PS which received 13 or 25.5% of the vote. The next three most popular parties were; the PPD (with 12 or 23.5%), the LEGA (with 10 or 19.6%) and the LEGA (with 10 or 19.6%).

== Economy ==
As of 2007, Sonogno had an unemployment rate of 1.22%. There were 46 residents of the municipality who were employed in some capacity, of which females made up 37% of the workforce.

In 2000, there were 11 workers who commuted into the municipality and 16 workers who commuted away. The municipality is a net exporter of workers, with about 1.5 workers leaving the municipality for every one entering. Of the working population, 4.3% used public transportation to get to work, and 47.8% used a private car.

As of 2009, there was one hotel in Sonogno.

== Religion ==
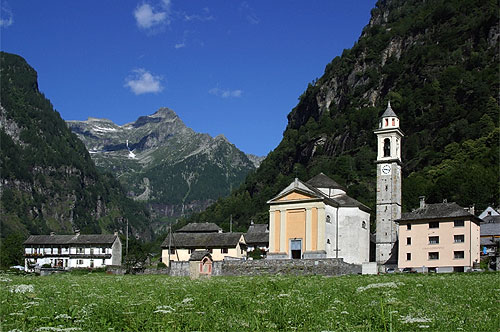
Village church of Sonogno

From the 2000 census, 74 or 86.0% were Roman Catholic, while 1 or 1.2% belonged to the Swiss Reformed Church. There are 6 individuals (or about 6.98% of the population) who belong to another church (not listed on the census), and 5 individuals (or about 5.81% of the population) did not answer the question.

== Weather ==
Sonogno has an average of 108.6 days of rain or snow per year and on average receives 2,110 mm (83 in) of precipitation. The wettest month is September during which time Sonogno receives an average of 249 mm (9.8 in) of rain or snow. During this month there is precipitation for an average of 8.3 days. The month with the most days of precipitation is May, with an average of 13.2, but with only 230 mm (9.1 in) of rain or snow. The driest month of the year is December with an average of 78 mm (3.1 in) of precipitation over 6.4 days.

== Education ==
The entire Swiss population is generally well educated. In Sonogno about 66.7% of the population (between age 25-64) have completed either non-mandatory upper secondary education or additional higher education (either university or a Fachhochschule).

In Sonogno there were a total of 8 students (as of 2009). The Ticino education system provides up to three years of non-mandatory kindergarten and in Sonogno there were 2 children in kindergarten. The primary school program lasts for five years. In the village, students attended the standard primary schools. In the lower secondary school system, students either attend a two-year middle school followed by a two-year pre-apprenticeship or they attend a four-year program to prepare for higher education. There were 4 students in the two-year middle school, while 1 students were in the four-year advanced program.

The upper secondary school includes several options, but at the end of the upper secondary program, a student will be prepared to enter a trade or to continue on to a university or college. In Ticino, vocational students may either attend school while working on their internship or apprenticeship (which takes three or four years) or may attend school followed by an internship or apprenticeship (which takes one year as a full-time student or one and a half to two years as a part-time student). There was 1 vocational student who was attending school full-time and 0 who attend part-time.

As of 2000, there were 1 students from Sonogno who attended schools outside the municipality.

== In popular culture ==
In Pedro Almodóvar's movie Julieta, Julieta's daughter Antía lives in Sonogno.

The events of the German novel, The Black Brothers, and the anime based on it (Romeo's Blue Skies), follow a young boy from Sonogno village who sold himself to work as a chimney sweep in Milan, Italy. It was inspired by a real event where a ferry carrying chimney sweeps sunk in a storm.
