= Ortsgemeinde =

Ortsgemeinde may refer to:

- Ortsgemeinde (Austria), a type of municipality in Austria
- Ortsgemeinde (Germany), a type of municipality in Germany
- Ortsgemeinde (Switzerland)
