= Frasco =

- Former municipality
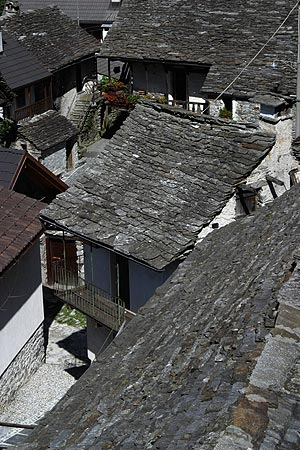
- Frasco village

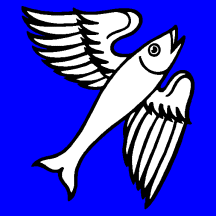
- Flag Coat of arms
- Location of Frasco
- Location within Switzerland Location within Canton of Ticino
- Coordinates: 46°20′N 8°48′E
- Country: Switzerland
- Canton: Ticino
- District: Locarno

Government
  - Mayor: Sindaco

Area
  - Total: 25.72 km^{2} (9.93 sq mi)
- Elevation: 885 m (2,904 ft)

Population (December 2019)
  - Total: 112
  - Density: 4.35/km^{2} (11.3/sq mi)
- Time zone: UTC+01:00 (CET)
  - Summer (DST): UTC+02:00 (CEST)
- Postal code: 6636
- SFOS number: 5105
- ISO 3166 code: CH-TI
- Surrounded by: Chironico, Gerra (Verzasca), Giornico, Lavertezzo, Personico, Sonogno
- Website: www.frasco.ch

Frasco is a village and former municipality in the district of Locarno in the canton of Ticino in Switzerland. On 17 October 2020 the former municipalities of Vogorno, Sonogno, Corippo, Brione (Verzasca) and Frasco merged to form the new municipality of Verzasca.

== History ==
Frasco is first mentioned in 1235 as Felasco. During the Middle Ages, Frasco was part of the greater Vicinanza of Verzasca. In 1395, it and Sonogno formed a single political municipality, which existed until 1843. The village church of St. Bernhard was probably built in the 14th century. The present church dates from 1868 to 1869 and stands on the foundations of the old building. In 1518 Frasco and Sonogno separated from the parish of Vogorno and formed their own parish, which lasted until it divided again in 1734. For centuries, the inhabitants lived on agriculture and alpine seasonal migrations with livestock. Starting in 1870, the Val d'Efra, a vein of white marble, was exploited for limestone quarries. In 2000, the agricultural sector was the only sector providing jobs in Frasco, while about two-thirds of the workers were commuters. In the hamlet of Piede della Motta, there are frescoes from the 15th century. All of the old settlement areas of the municipality are now protected as historical buildings. More recently, however, many houses have been built in the municipality.

== Geography ==
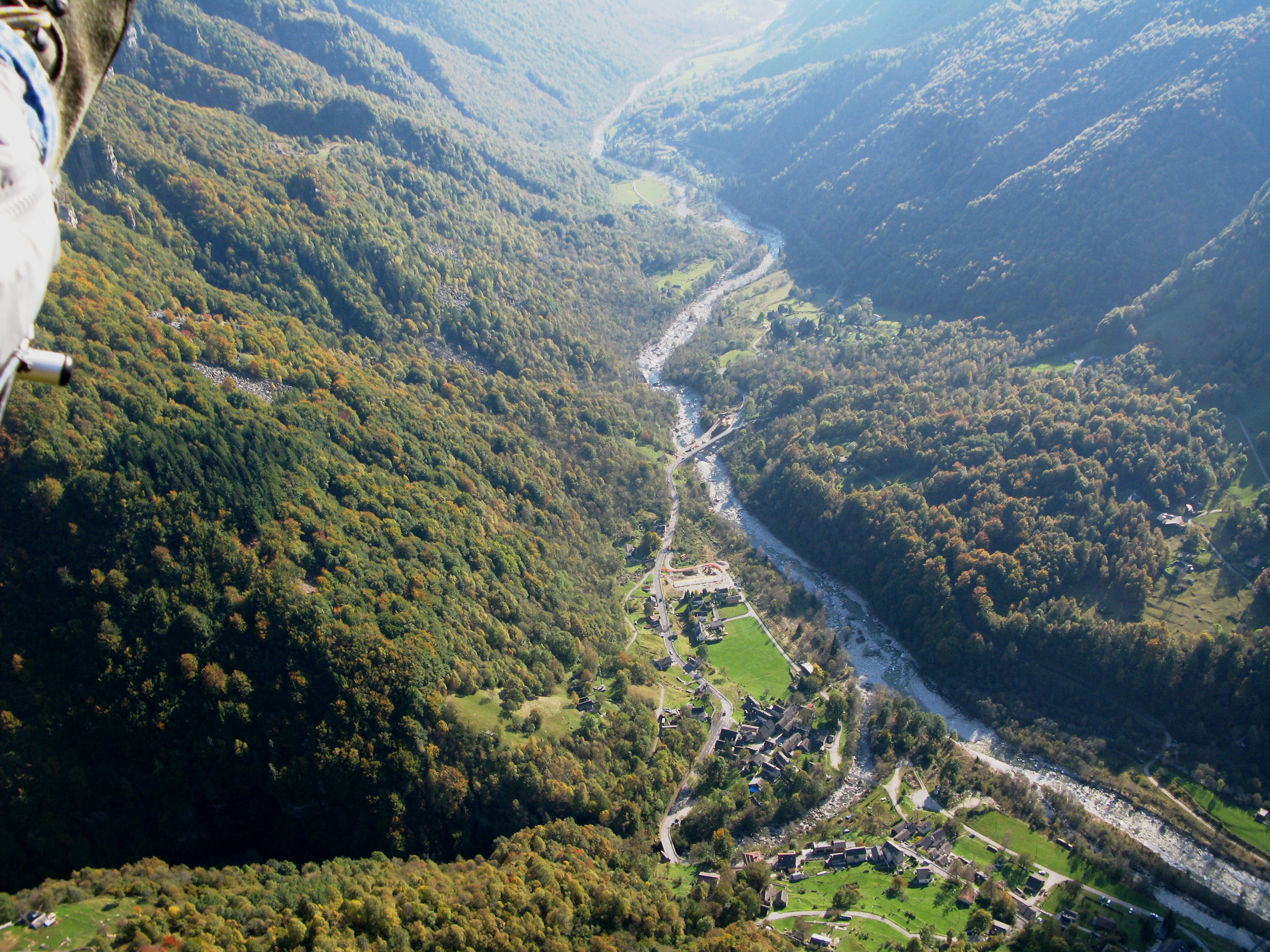
Aerial view of Frasco

Aerial view from 2000 m by Walter Mittelholzer (1923)

Frasco had an area, as of 1997, of 25.72 square kilometers (9.93 sq mi). Of this area, 0.45 km^{2} (0.17 sq mi) or 1.7% is used for agricultural purposes, while 11.14 km^{2} (4.30 sq mi) or 43.3% is forested. Of the rest of the land, 0.22 km^{2} (0.085 sq mi) or 0.9% is settled (buildings or roads), 0.48 km^{2} (0.19 sq mi) or 1.9% is either rivers or lakes and 12.09 km^{2} (4.67 sq mi) or 47.0% is unproductive land.

Of the built up area, housing and buildings made up 0.4% and transportation infrastructure made up 0.3%. Out of the forested land, 27.4% of the total land area is heavily forested, while 11.7% is covered in small trees and shrubbery and 4.1% is covered with orchards or small clusters of trees. Of the agricultural land, 1.3% is used for growing crops. All the water in the municipality is flowing water. Of the unproductive areas, 24.3% is unproductive vegetation and 22.7% is too rocky for vegetation.

The village is located in the Locarno district. It consists of the village of Frasco and multiple scattered settlements along the road in the upper Verzasca valley. The average elevation of the settlements is about 880 meters (2,890 ft).

== Coat of arms ==
The blazon of the municipal coat of arms is Azure a winged fish flying in bend sinister. The flying fish refers to trout breeding and fishing, typical in the area.

== Demographics ==
Frasco had a population (as of 2019) of 112. As of 2008, 7.7% of the population are resident foreign nationals. Over the last 10 years (1997–2007) the population has changed at a rate of 18.8%.

Most of the population (as of 2000) speaks Italian (94.0%), with German and French being second most common (1.0% each). Of the Swiss national languages (as of 2000), 1 speak German, 1 person speaks French, 94 people speak Italian. The remainder (4 people) speak another language.

As of 2008, the gender distribution of the population was 55.8% male and 44.2% female. The population was made up of 60 Swiss men (53.1% of the population), and 3 (2.7%) non-Swiss men. There were 49 Swiss women (43.4%), and 1 (0.9%) non-Swiss women.

In 2008 there was 1 live birth to Swiss citizens and 1 death of a Swiss citizen. At the same time, there was 1 non-Swiss man and 1 non-Swiss woman who immigrated from another country to Switzerland. The total Swiss population change in 2008 (from all sources) was an increase of 1 and the non-Swiss population change was an increase of 2 people. This represents a population growth rate of 2.6%.

The age distribution, as of 2009, in Frasco is; 10 children or 8.8% of the population are between 0 and 9 years old and 19 teenagers or 16.8% are between 10 and 19. Of the adult population, 6 people or 5.3% of the population are between 20 and 29 years old. 13 people or 11.5% are between 30 and 39, 24 people or 21.2% are between 40 and 49, and 16 people or 14.2% are between 50 and 59. The senior population distribution is 14 people or 12.4% of the population are between 60 and 69 years old, 8 people or 7.1% are between 70 and 79, there are 3 people or 2.7% who are over 80.

As of 2000, there were 37 private households in the municipality, and an average of 2.6 persons per household. In 2000 there were 187 single family homes (or 93.5% of the total) out of a total of 200 inhabited buildings. There were 8 two family buildings (4.0%) and 1 multi-family building (0.5%). There were also 4 buildings in the municipality that were multipurpose buildings (used for both housing and commercial or another purpose).

The vacancy rate for the municipality, in 2008, was 0%. In 2000 there were 208 apartments in the municipality. The most common apartment size was the 3 room apartment of which there were 56. There were 23 single room apartments and 33 apartments with five or more rooms. Of these apartments, a total of 36 apartments (17.3% of the total) were permanently occupied, while 172 apartments (82.7%) were seasonally occupied. As of 2007, the construction rate of new housing units was 0 new units per 1000 residents.

The historical population is given in the following table:

year	population
1626	550
1850	445
1900	345
1950	128
1990	157
2000	100

== Politics ==
In the 2007 federal election the most popular party was the CVP which received 32.78% of the vote. The next three most popular parties were the Ticino League (27.39%), the SVP (17.84%) and the FDP (14.52%). In the federal election, a total of 32 votes were cast, and the voter turnout was 36.4%.

In the 2007 Gran Consiglio election, there were a total of 90 registered voters in Frasco, of which 65 or 72.2% voted. The most popular party was the LEGA which received 26 or 40.0% of the vote. The next three most popular parties were; the SSI (with 13 or 20.0%), the PPD+GenGiova (with 12 or 18.5%) and the PS (with 6 or 9.2%).

In the 2007 Consiglio di Stato election, the most popular party was the LEGA which received 23 or 35.4% of the vote. The next three most popular parties were; the PPD (with 13 or 20.0%), the SSI (with 12 or 18.5%) and the PS (with 9 or 13.8%).

== Economy ==
As of 2007, Frasco had an unemployment rate of 1.32%. As of 2005, there were 10 people employed in the primary economic sector and about 4 businesses involved in this sector. No one is employed in the secondary sector or the tertiary sector. There were 37 residents of the municipality who were employed in some capacity, of which females made up 27.0% of the workforce.

In 2000, there were 24 workers who commuted away from the municipality. Of the working population, 2.7% used public transportation to get to work, and 62.2% used a private car.

== Religion ==
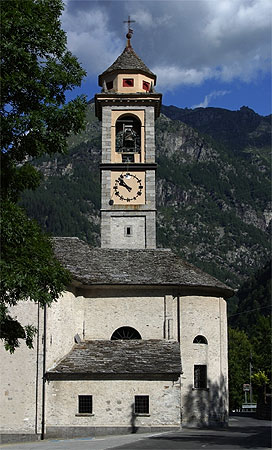
Church of Frasco

From the 2000 census, 87 or 87.0% were Roman Catholic, while 2 or 2.0% belonged to the Swiss Reformed Church. There are 7 individuals (or about 7.00% of the population) who belong to another church (not listed on the census), and 4 individuals (or about 4.00% of the population) did not answer the question.

== Education ==
The entire Swiss population is generally well educated. In Frasco about 63.1% of the population (between age 25 and 64) have completed either non-mandatory upper secondary education or additional higher education (either university or a Fachhochschule).

In Frasco there were a total of 22 students (as of 2009). The Ticino education system provides up to three years of non-mandatory kindergarten and in Frasco there were 2 children in kindergarten. The primary school program lasts for five years. In the municipality, 7 students attended the standard primary schools. In the lower secondary school system, students either attend a two-year middle school followed by a two-year pre-apprenticeship or they attend a four-year program to prepare for higher education. There were 9 students in the two-year middle school, while 1 students were in the four-year advanced program.

The upper secondary school includes several options, but at the end of the upper secondary program, a student will be prepared to enter a trade or to continue on to a university or college. In Ticino, vocational students may either attend school while working on their internship or apprenticeship (which takes three or four years) or may attend school followed by an internship or apprenticeship (which takes one year as a full-time student or one and a half to two years as a part-time student). There was 1 vocational student who was attending school full-time and 2 who attend part-time.

As of 2000, there were 4 students from Frasco who attended schools outside the municipality.

== Crime ==
In 2014 the crime rate, of the over 200 crimes listed in the Swiss Criminal Code (running from murder, robbery and assault to accepting bribes and election fraud), in Frasco was 18.9 per thousand residents, or about 2 crimes that year. Since the rate of violations of immigration, visa and work permit laws was also 18.9 per thousand residents, it appears that the two crimes may have been immigration related. During the same period, the rate of drug crimes was 0 per thousand residents.
