= Vogorno =

- Former municipality
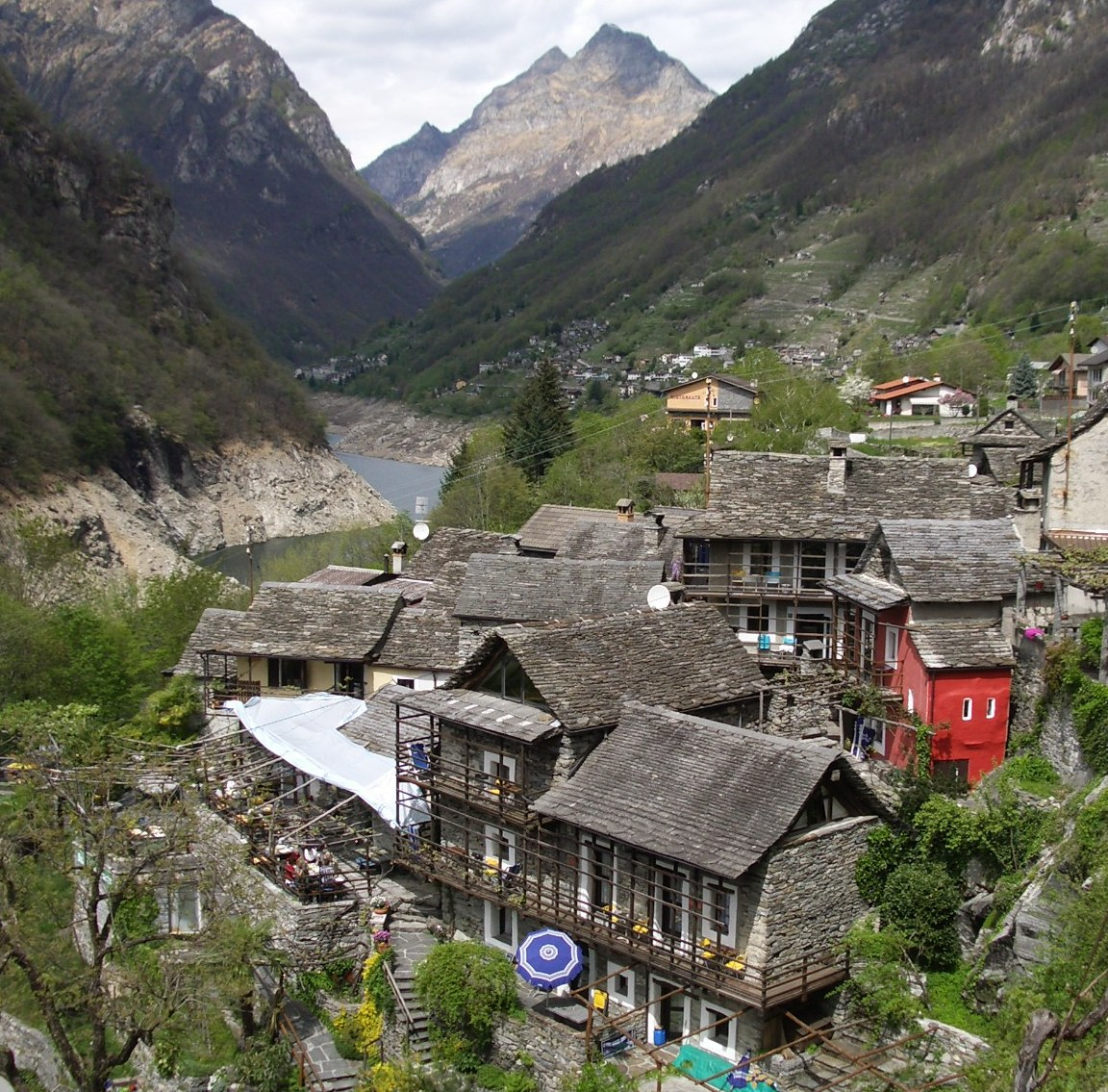

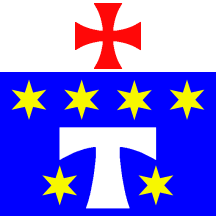
- Flag Coat of arms
- Location of Vogorno
- Location within Switzerland Location within Canton of Ticino
- Coordinates: 46°13′N 8°51′E
- Country: Switzerland
- Canton: Ticino
- District: Locarno

Government
  - Mayor: Sindaco

Area
  - Total: 23.88 km^{2} (9.22 sq mi)
- Elevation: 461 m (1,512 ft)

Population (December 2019)
  - Total: 270
  - Density: 11/km^{2} (29/sq mi)
- Time zone: UTC+01:00 (CET)
  - Summer (DST): UTC+02:00 (CEST)
- Postal code: 6632
- SFOS number: 5135
- ISO 3166 code: CH-TI
- Surrounded by: Corippo, Cugnasco, Gordola, Lavertezzo, Mergoscia, Preonzo
- Website: SFSO statistics

Vogorno is a village and former municipality in the district of Locarno in the canton of Ticino in Switzerland. The village is located above Lago di Vogorno, a reservoir formed by the Verzasca Dam. On 17 October 2020 the former municipalities of Vogorno, Sonogno, Corippo, Brione (Verzasca) and Frasco merged to form the new municipality of Verzasca.

== Geography ==
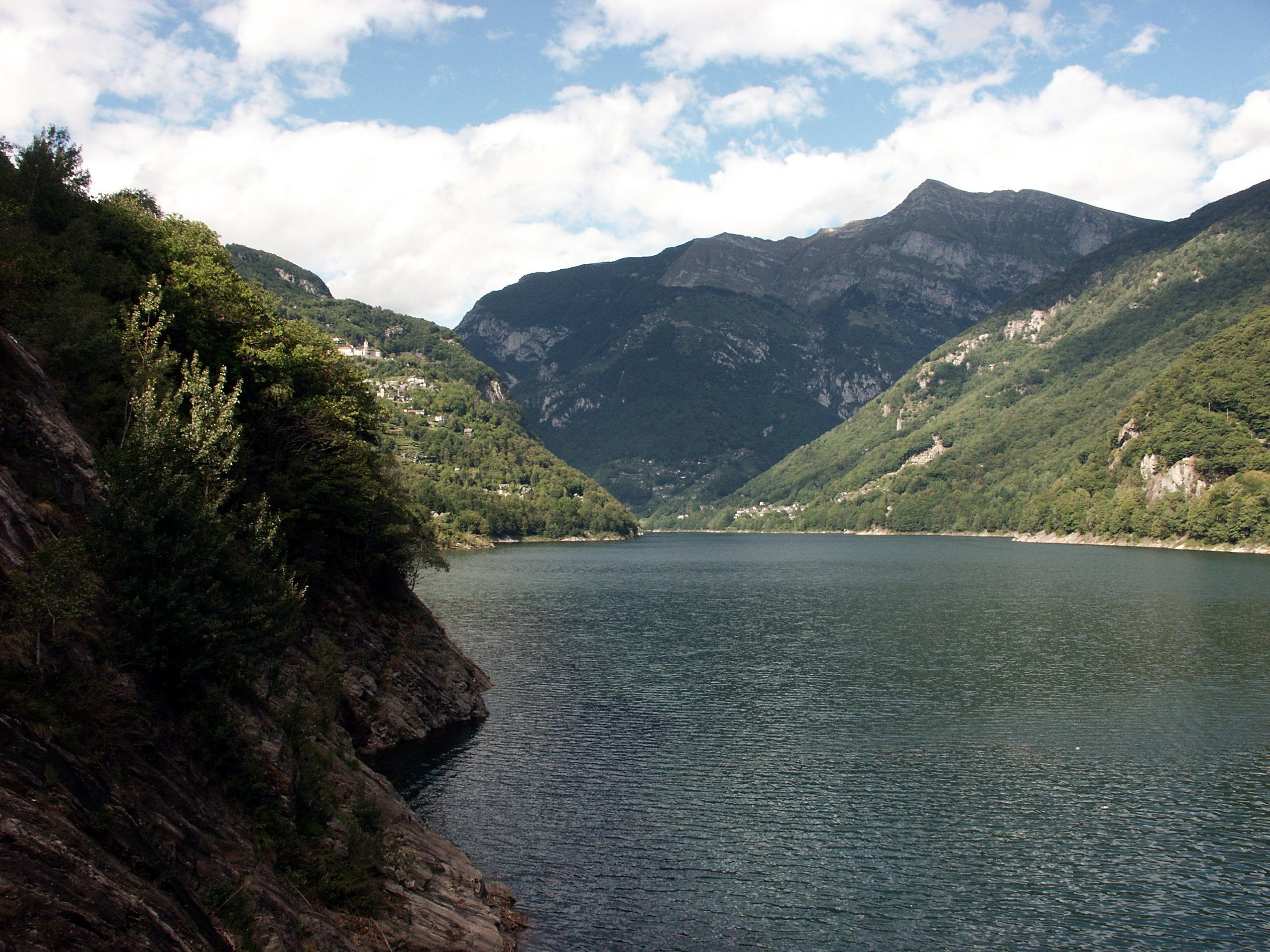
Lago di Vogorno

Vogorno had an area, as of 1997, of 23.88 square kilometers (9.22 sq mi). Of this area, 0.38 km^{2} (0.15 sq mi) or 1.6% is used for agricultural purposes, while 14.21 km^{2} (5.49 sq mi) or 59.5% is forested. Of the rest of the land, 0.3 km^{2} (0.12 sq mi) or 1.3% is settled (buildings or roads), 0.72 km^{2} (0.28 sq mi) or 3.0% is either rivers or lakes and 5.45 km^{2} (2.10 sq mi) or 22.8% is unproductive land.

Of the built up area, housing and buildings made up 0.6% and transportation infrastructure made up 0.6%. Out of the forested land, 50.0% of the total land area is heavily forested and 2.1% is covered with orchards or small clusters of trees. Of the agricultural land, 0.5% is used for growing crops. Of the water in the municipality, 2.6% is in lakes and 0.4% is in rivers and streams. Of the unproductive areas, 15.1% is unproductive vegetation and 7.7% is too rocky for vegetation.

== Coat of arms ==
The blazon of the municipal coat of arms is Azure a Tau cross argent pattee couped between six mullets or four and two and in a chief argent a cross pattee couped gules.

== Demographics ==
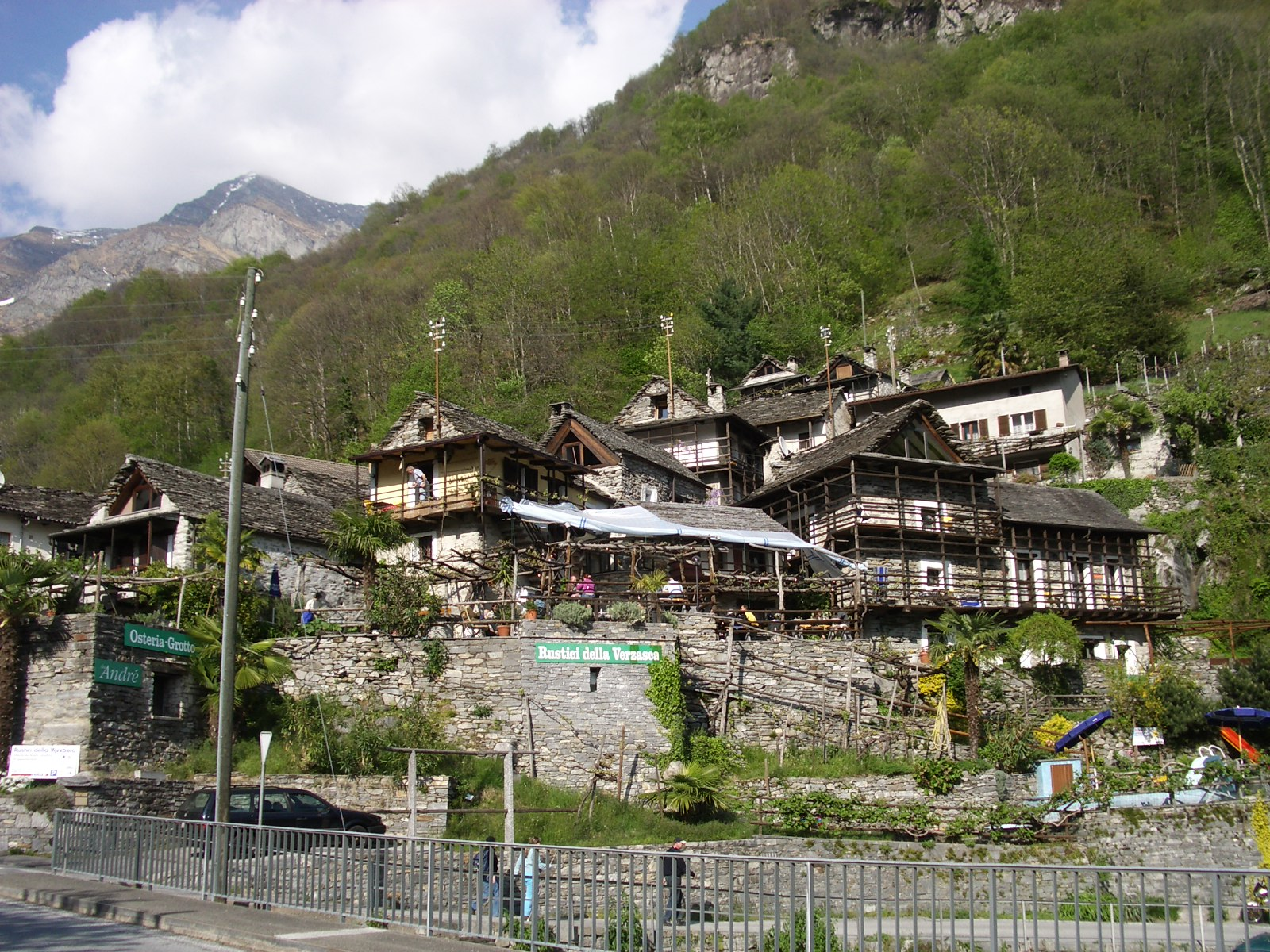
Berzona/Vogorno village

Vogorno has a population (as of 2019) of 270. As of 2008, 5.2% of the population are resident foreign nationals. Over the last 10 years (1997–2007) the population has changed at a rate of -6.5%.

Most of the population (as of 2000) speaks Italian (83.9%), with German being second most common (13.8%) and Spanish being third (1.3%). Of the Swiss national languages (as of 2000), 42 speak German, 1 person speaks French, 255 people speak Italian. The remainder (6 people) speak another language.

As of 2008, the gender distribution of the population was 48.4% male and 51.6% female. The population was made up of 133 Swiss men (46.3% of the population), and 6 (2.1%) non-Swiss men. There were 141 Swiss women (49.1%), and 7 (2.4%) non-Swiss women.

In 2008 there were 3 live births to Swiss citizens and were 6 deaths of Swiss citizens. Ignoring immigration and emigration, the population of Swiss citizens decreased by 3 while the foreign population remained the same. There was 1 non-Swiss man who immigrated from another country to Switzerland. The total Swiss population change in 2008 (from all sources, including moves across municipal borders) was a decrease of 2 and the non-Swiss population change was an increase of 2 people. This represents a population growth rate of 0.0%.

The age distribution, as of 2009, in Vogorno is; 16 children or 5.6% of the population are between 0 and 9 years old and 18 teenagers or 6.3% are between 10 and 19. Of the adult population, 40 people or 13.9% of the population are between 20 and 29 years old. 35 people or 12.2% are between 30 and 39, 42 people or 14.6% are between 40 and 49, and 46 people or 16.0% are between 50 and 59. The senior population distribution is 46 people or 16.0% of the population are between 60 and 69 years old, 22 people or 7.7% are between 70 and 79, there are 22 people or 7.7% who are over 80.

As of 2000, there were 147 private households in the municipality, and an average of 2.1 persons per household. In 2000 there were 448 single family homes (or 92.2% of the total) out of a total of 486 inhabited buildings. There were 24 two family buildings (4.9%) and 5 multi-family buildings (1.0%). There were also 9 buildings in the municipality that were multipurpose buildings (used for both housing and commercial or another purpose).

The vacancy rate for the municipality, in 2008, was 0%. In 2000 there were 519 apartments in the municipality. The most common apartment size was the 3 room apartment of which there were 144. There were 70 single room apartments and 46 apartments with five or more rooms. Of these apartments, a total of 144 apartments (27.7% of the total) were permanently occupied, while 374 apartments (72.1%) were seasonally occupied and 1 apartments (0.2%) were empty. As of 2007, the construction rate of new housing units was 0 new units per 1000 residents.

The historical population is given in the following table:

| year | population |
|---|---|
| 1850 | 658 |
| 1900 | 661 |
| 1950 | 364 |
| 1970 | 252 |
| 1990 | 268 |
| 2000 | 304 |

== Politics ==
In the 2007 federal election the most popular party was the SP which received 36.44% of the vote. The next three most popular parties were the FDP (24.58%), the CVP (12.08%) and the Ticino League (11.23%). In the federal election, a total of 65 votes were cast, and the voter turnout was 25.7%.

In the 2007 Gran Consiglio election, there were a total of 274 registered voters in Vogorno, of which 141 or 51.5% voted. 2 blank ballots were cast, leaving 139 valid ballots in the election. The most popular party was the PLRT which received 32 or 23.0% of the vote. The next three most popular parties were; the PS (with 29 or 20.9%), the SSI (with 26 or 18.7%) and the PPD+GenGiova (with 22 or 15.8%).

In the 2007 Consiglio di Stato election, 1 blank ballot and 1 null ballot was cast, leaving 139 valid ballots in the election. The most popular party was the LEGA which received 39 or 28.1% of the vote. The next three most popular parties were; the PLRT (with 35 or 25.2%), the PS (with 33 or 23.7%) and the PPD (with 17 or 12.2%).

== Economy ==
As of 2007, Vogorno had an unemployment rate of 1.94%. As of 2005, there were 26 people employed in the primary economic sector and about 7 businesses involved in this sector. 11 people were employed in the secondary sector and there were 3 businesses in this sector. 22 people were employed in the tertiary sector, with 8 businesses in this sector. There were 140 residents of the municipality who were employed in some capacity, of which females made up 40.0% of the workforce.

In 2000, there were 14 workers who commuted into the municipality and 100 workers who commuted away. The municipality is a net exporter of workers, with about 7.1 workers leaving the municipality for every one entering. Of the working population, 7.9% used public transportation to get to work, and 60.7% used a private car. As of 2009, there were 2 hotels in Vogorno.

== Religion ==
From the 2000 census, 259 or 85.2% were Roman Catholic, while 20 or 6.6% belonged to the Swiss Reformed Church. There are 21 individuals (or about 6.91% of the population) who belong to another church (not listed on the census), and 4 individuals (or about 1.32% of the population) did not answer the question.

== Education ==
In Vogorno about 63% of the population (between age 25-64) have completed either non-mandatory upper secondary education or additional higher education (either university or a Fachhochschule).

In Vogorno there were a total of 29 students (as of 2009). The Ticino education system provides up to three years of non-mandatory kindergarten and in Vogorno there were 3 children in kindergarten. The primary school program lasts for five years. In the village, 10 students attended the standard primary schools. In the lower secondary school system, students either attend a two-year middle school followed by a two-year pre-apprenticeship or they attend a four-year program to prepare for higher education. There were 9 students in the two-year middle school, while 2 students were in the four-year advanced program.

The upper secondary school includes several options, but at the end of the upper secondary program, a student will be prepared to enter a trade or to continue on to a university or college. In Ticino, vocational students may either attend school while working on their internship or apprenticeship (which takes three or four years) or may attend school followed by an internship or apprenticeship (which takes one year as a full-time student or one and a half to two years as a part-time student). There were 2 vocational students who were attending school full-time and 2 who attend part-time.

The professional program lasts three years and prepares a student for a job in engineering, nursing, computer science, business, tourism and similar fields. There was 1 student in the professional program.

As of 2000, there were 6 students in Vogorno who came from another municipality, while 17 residents attended schools outside the municipality.
