= Lavertezzo =

- Municipality
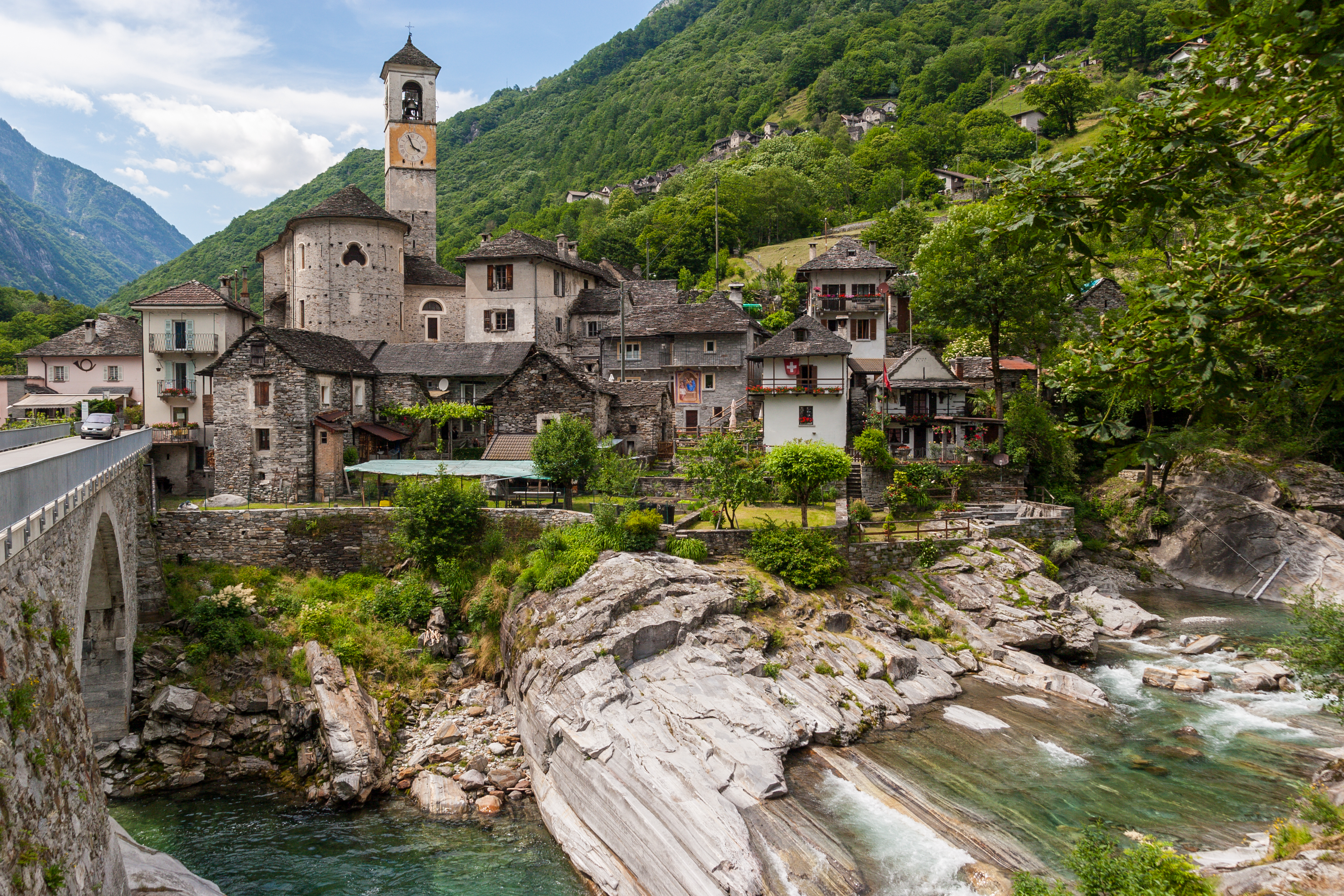
- Lavertezzo Valle

- Flag Coat of arms
- Location of Lavertezzo
- Location within Switzerland Location within Canton of Ticino
- Coordinates: 46°15′N 8°50′E
- Country: Switzerland
- Canton: Ticino
- District: Locarno

Government
  - Mayor: Sindaco

Area
  - Total: 58.11 km^{2} (22.44 sq mi)
- Elevation: 536 m (1,759 ft)

Population (December 2004)
  - Total: 1,161
  - Density: 19.98/km^{2} (51.75/sq mi)
- Time zone: UTC+01:00 (CET)
  - Summer (DST): UTC+02:00 (CEST)
- Postal code: 6595
- SFOS number: 5112
- ISO 3166 code: CH-TI
- Surrounded by: Brione (Verzasca), Corippo, Cugnasco, Frasco, Gerra (Verzasca), Gordevio, Gordola, Iragna, Locarno, Lodrino, Personico, Preonzo, Vogorno
- Website: lavertezzo.ch

Lavertezzo is a municipality in the district of Locarno in the canton of Ticino in Switzerland.

== History ==
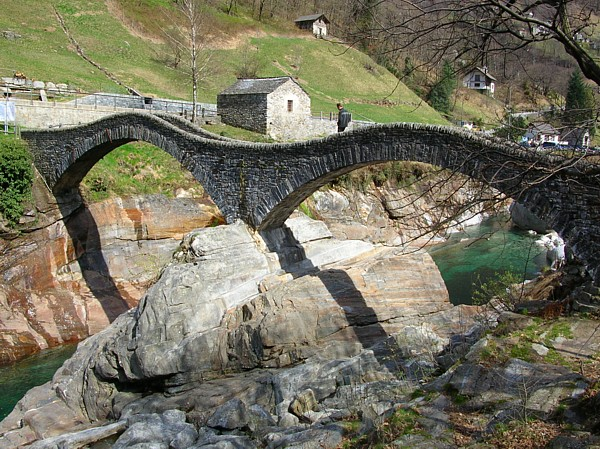
Double arch stone bridge at Ponte dei Salti

Lavertezzo is first mentioned in 1327 as Laverteze. In the Middle Ages, Lavertezzo was a Squadra of the Vicinanza of Verzasca. For centuries, the people lived in the summer months in the Verzasca valley and migrated in the winter, with their cattle, to the lower valleys. After the dissolution of Terricciole in 1920, a shared territory between Locarno, Minusio and Mergoscia, the settlement of Riazzino was allocated to Lavertezzo.

The parish church of Madonna degli Angeli was built in the 18th century. Lavertezzo became an independent parish in the 16th century, when it separated from Vogorno. It was granted a provost in 1806.

The double arch stone bridge was built in the 17th century and is one of the most distinctive sights in the village. The economy in the valley consisted mainly of farming and grazing. There was added income, from emigrants who went to Italy, especially Palermo. In 1873, they began to systematically produce granite from quarries in Lavertezzo. In the last decades of the 20th century Riazzino developed into a shopping and recreation center. By 2000, the agricultural sector still provided a good one-tenth of the jobs in Lavertezzo.

== Geography ==
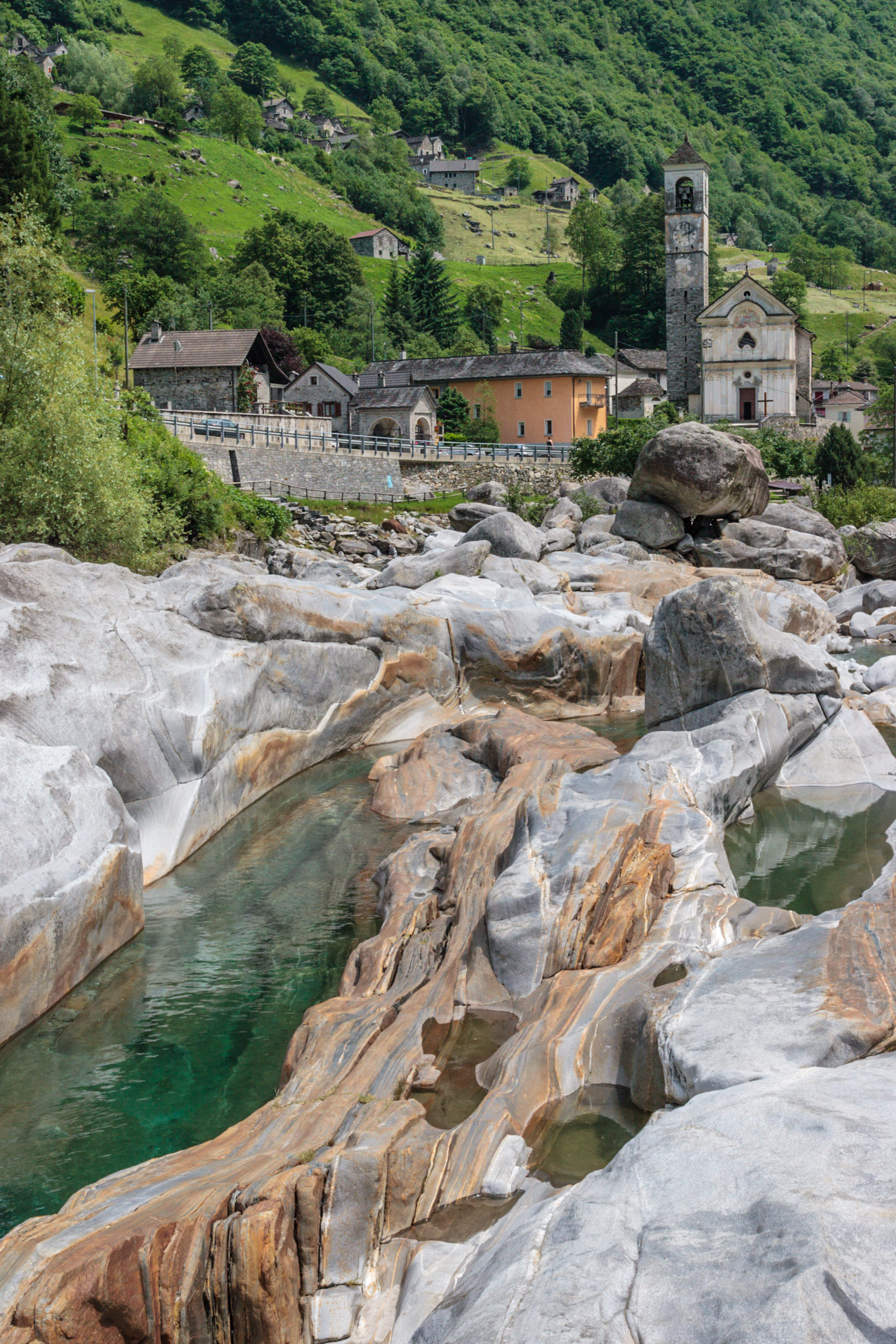
Lavertezzo and Verzasca river

Aerial view (1946)

Lavertezzo has an area, as of 1997, of 58.11 square kilometers (22.44 sq mi). Of this area, 0.7 km^{2} (0.27 sq mi) or 1.2% is used for agricultural purposes, while 29.34 km^{2} (11.33 sq mi) or 50.5% is forested. Of the rest of the land, 0.52 km^{2} (0.20 sq mi) or 0.9% is settled (buildings or roads), 0.96 km^{2} (0.37 sq mi) or 1.7% is either rivers or lakes and 22.83 km^{2} (8.81 sq mi) or 39.3% is unproductive land.

Of the built up area, housing and buildings made up 0.5% and transportation infrastructure made up 0.1%. Out of the forested land, 36.8% of the total land area is heavily forested, while 11.4% is covered in small trees and shrubbery and 2.3% is covered with orchards or small clusters of trees. Of the agricultural land, 0.4% is used for growing crops. All the water in the municipality is flowing water. Of the unproductive areas, 23.4% is unproductive vegetation and 15.9% is too rocky for vegetation.

The municipality is located in the Locarno district. It consists of the village of Lavertezzo in the Verzasca valley (with the hamlets of Aquino, Rancone and Sambugaro) and the exclave of Lavertezzo Piano in the Magadino valley (with the village sections of Riazzino, Montedato and Bugaro).

== Coat of arms ==
The blazon of the municipal coat of arms is Azure a pelican in her piety argent voulned gules. The coat of arms comes from the arms of Bishop Aurelio Bacciarini.

== Demographics ==
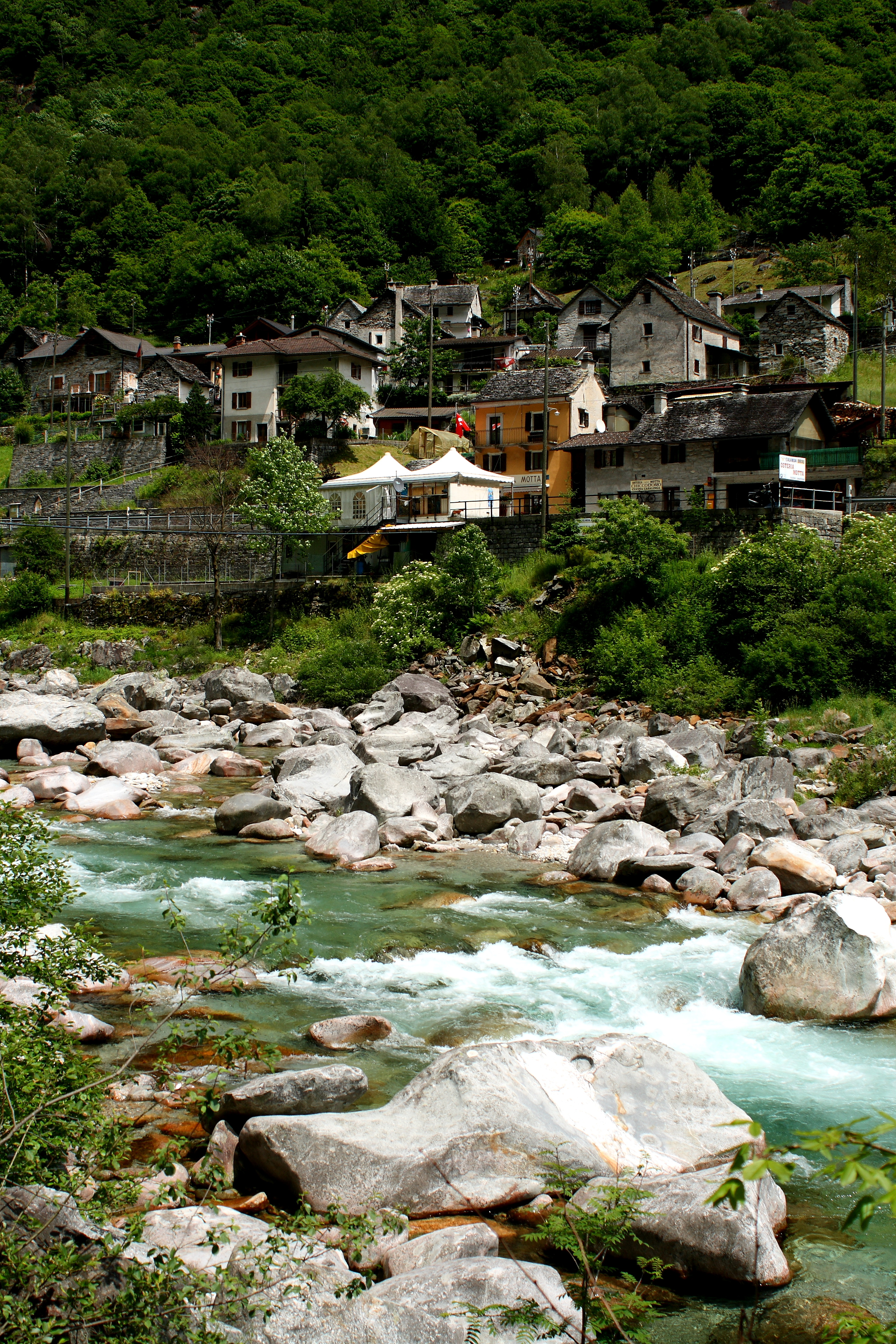
Motta hamlet, one of the small villages along the Verzasca river

Lavertezzo has a population (as of December 2020) of 1,245. As of 2008, 23.6% of the population are resident foreign nationals. Over the last 10 years (1997–2007) the population has changed at a rate of 15.1%.

Most of the population (as of 2000) speaks Italian (82.6%), with German being second most common (9.2%) and Serbian or Croatian language being third (2.6%). Of the Swiss national languages (as of 2000), 101 speak German, 11 people speak French, 907 people speak Italian. The remainder (79 people) speak another language.

As of 2008, the gender distribution of the population was 49.7% male and 50.3% female. The population was made up of 439 Swiss men (35.8% of the population), and 170 (13.9%) non-Swiss men. There were 489 Swiss women (39.9%), and 128 (10.4%) non-Swiss women.

In 2008, there were 11 live births to Swiss citizens and 3 births to non-Swiss citizens, and in same time span there were 7 deaths of Swiss citizens and 1 non-Swiss citizen death. Ignoring immigration and emigration, the population of Swiss citizens increased by 4 while the foreign population increased by 2. There were 3 Swiss men and 2 Swiss women who emigrated from Switzerland. At the same time, there were 6 non-Swiss men and 4 non-Swiss women who immigrated from another country to Switzerland. The total Swiss population change in 2008 (from all sources, including moves across municipal borders) was an increase of 15 and the non-Swiss population change was a decrease of 1 person. This represents a population growth rate of 1.2%.

The age distribution, as of 2009, in Lavertezzo is; 134 children or 10.9% of the population are between 0 and 9 years old and 127 teenagers or 10.4% are between 10 and 19. Of the adult population, 146 people or 11.9% of the population are between 20 and 29 years old. 181 people or 14.8% are between 30 and 39, 231 people or 18.8% are between 40 and 49, and 149 people or 12.2% are between 50 and 59. The senior population distribution is 120 people or 9.8% of the population are between 60 and 69 years old, 90 people or 7.3% are between 70 and 79, there are 48 people or 3.9% who are over 80.

As of 2000, there were 450 private households in the municipality, and an average of 2.4 persons per household. In 2000 there were 374 single family homes (or 82.0% of the total) out of a total of 456 inhabited buildings. There were 52 two family buildings (11.4%) and 14 multi-family buildings (3.1%). There were also 16 buildings in the municipality that were multipurpose buildings (used for both housing and commercial or another purpose).

The vacancy rate for the municipality, in 2008, was 0.13%. In 2000 there were 709 apartments in the municipality. The most common apartment size was the 4 room apartment of which there were 223. There were 39 single room apartments and 116 apartments with five or more rooms. Of these apartments, a total of 450 apartments (63.5% of the total) were permanently occupied, while 250 apartments (35.3%) were seasonally occupied and 9 apartments (1.3%) were empty. As of 2007, the construction rate of new housing units was 7.4 new units per 1000 residents.

The historical population is given in the following table:

year	population
1596	c. 400
1636	460
1850	464
1900	685
1950	358
2000	1,098

== Sights ==
The entire village of Lavertezzo is designated as part of the Inventory of Swiss Heritage Sites.

== Politics ==
In the 2007 federal election the most popular party was the FDP which received 26.19% of the vote. The next three most popular parties were the CVP (25.45%), the SP (18.51%) and the Ticino League (12.87%). In the federal election, a total of 266 votes were cast, and the voter turnout was 36.3%.

In the 2007 Gran Consiglio election, there were a total of 713 registered voters in Lavertezzo, of which 401 or 56.2% voted. 2 blank ballots and 2 null ballots were cast, leaving 397 valid ballots in the election. The most popular party was the PPD+GenGiova which received 104 or 26.2% of the vote. The next three most popular parties were; the PLRT (with 79 or 19.9%), the SSI (with 74 or 18.6%) and the PS (with 58 or 14.6%).

In the 2007 Consiglio di Stato election, 2 blank ballots and 3 null ballots were cast, leaving 396 valid ballots in the election. The most popular party was the PPD which received 97 or 24.5% of the vote. The next three most popular parties were; the LEGA (with 93 or 23.5%), the PLRT (with 69 or 17.4%) and the PS (with 62 or 15.7%).

== Economy ==
As of 2007, Lavertezzo had an unemployment rate of 4.71%. As of 2005, there were 27 people employed in the primary economic sector and about 13 businesses involved in this sector. 344 people were employed in the secondary sector and there were 21 businesses in this sector. 228 people were employed in the tertiary sector, with 59 businesses in this sector. There were 523 residents of the municipality who were employed in some capacity, of which females made up 41.5% of the workforce.

In 2000, there were 579 workers who commuted into the municipality and 384 workers who commuted away. The municipality is a net importer of workers, with about 1.5 workers entering the municipality for every one leaving. About 40.2% of the workforce coming into Lavertezzo are coming from outside Switzerland. Of the working population, 8.2% used public transportation to get to work, and 67.9% used a private car.

As of 2009, there were 2 hotels in Lavertezzo.

== Religion ==
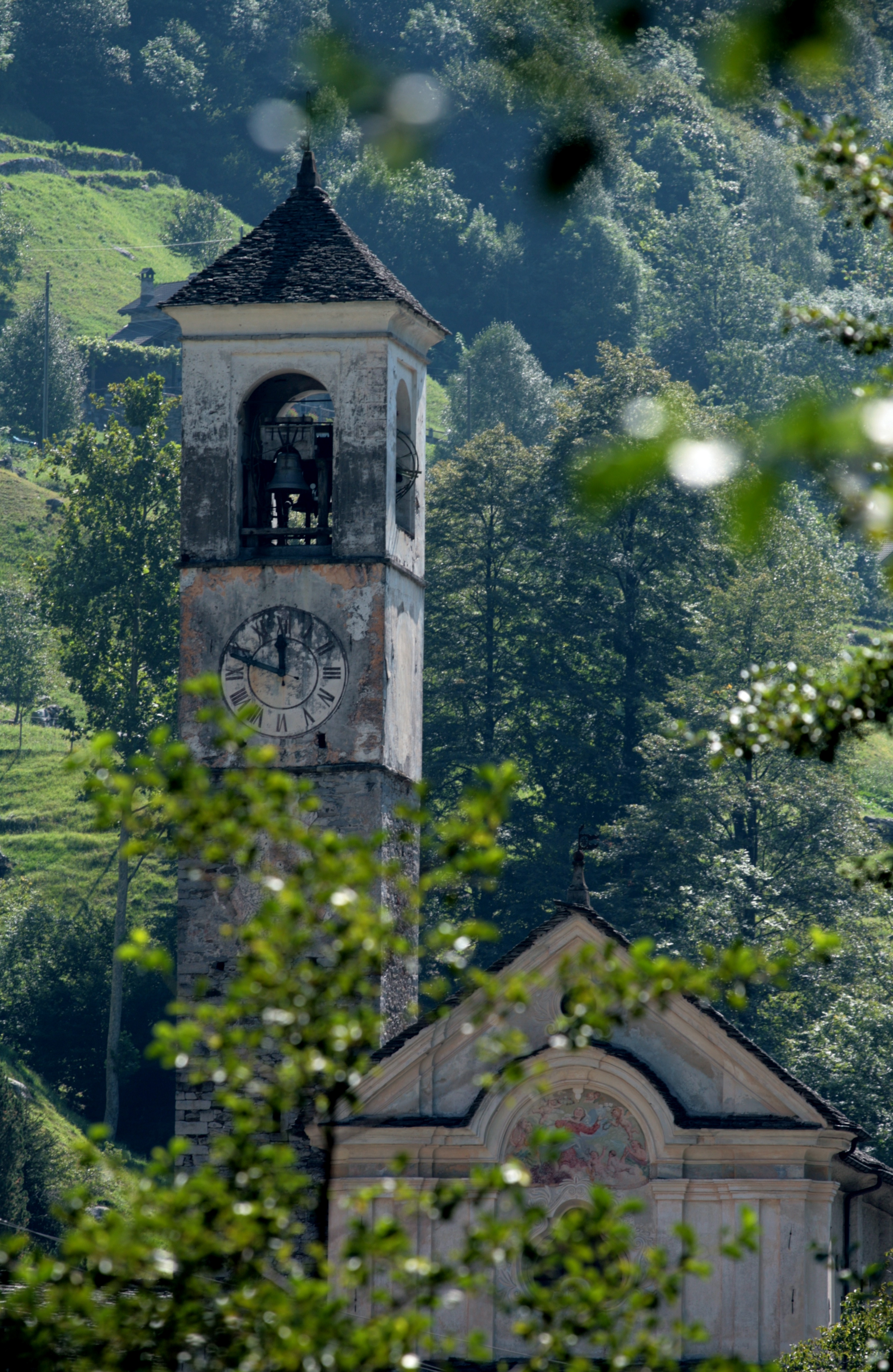
Church tower of the Church of Lavertezzo

According to the 2000 census, 840 or 76.5% were Roman Catholic, while 119 or 10.8% belonged to the Swiss Reformed Church. There are 96 individuals (or about 8.74% of the population) who belong to another church (not listed on the census), and 43 individuals (or about 3.92% of the population) did not answer the question.

== Education ==
The entire Swiss population is generally well educated. In Lavertezzo about 61.7% of the population (between age 25–64) have completed either non-mandatory upper secondary education or additional higher education (either university or a Fachhochschule).

In Lavertezzo there were a total of 221 students (as of 2009). The Ticino education system provides up to three years of non-mandatory kindergarten and in Lavertezzo there were 44 children in kindergarten. The primary school program lasts for five years and includes both a standard school and a special school. In the village, 74 students attended the standard primary schools and 3 students attended the special school. In the lower secondary school system, students either attend a two-year middle school followed by a two-year pre-apprenticeship or they attend a four-year program to prepare for higher education. There were 50 students in the two-year middle school, while 6 students were in the four-year advanced program.

The upper secondary school includes several options, but at the end of the upper secondary program, a student will be prepared to enter a trade or to continue on to a university or college. In Ticino, vocational students may either attend school while working on their internship or apprenticeship (which takes three or four years) or may attend school followed by an internship or apprenticeship (which takes one year as a full-time student or one and a half to two years as a part-time student). There were 15 vocational students who were attending school full-time and 28 who attend part-time.

The professional program lasts three years and prepares a student for a job in engineering, nursing, computer science, business, tourism and similar fields. There was 1 student in the professional program.

As of 2000, there were 99 students from Lavertezzo who attended schools outside the municipality.
