= Corippo =

- Former municipality
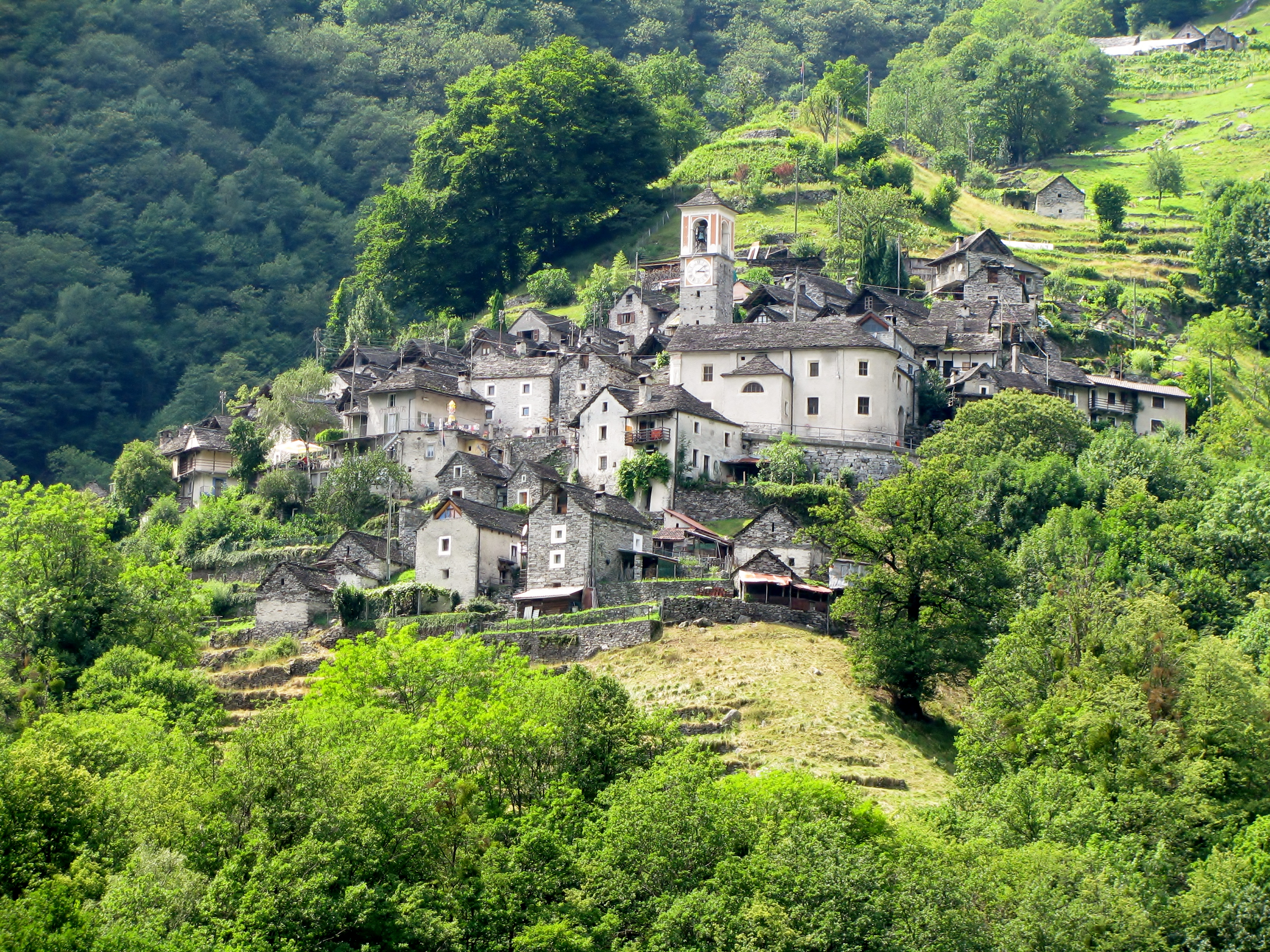

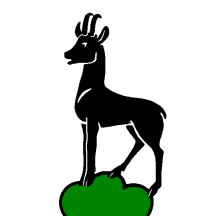
- Flag Coat of arms
- Location of Corippo
- Location within Switzerland Location within Canton of Ticino
- Coordinates: 46.236°N 8.841°E
- Country: Switzerland
- Canton: Ticino
- District: Locarno

Government
  - Mayor: Sindaco; Claudio Scettrini

Area
  - Total: 7.73 km^{2} (2.98 sq mi)
- Elevation: 558 m (1,831 ft)

Population (2019)
  - Total: 9
  - Density: 1.2/km^{2} (3.0/sq mi)
- Time zone: UTC+01:00 (CET)
  - Summer (DST): UTC+02:00 (CEST)
- Postal code: 6631
- SFOS number: 5102
- ISO 3166 code: CH-TI
- Surrounded by: Gordevio, Lavertezzo, Mergoscia, Vogorno
- Website: SFSO statistics

Corippo is a village and former municipality in the district of Locarno in the canton of Ticino in Switzerland.

With a population of just 12 inhabitants in July 2018, and dropping to 9 by December 2019 it was the smallest municipality in Switzerland. Despite this, it possessed the trappings of communities many times its size: its own coat of arms, a village church, a restaurant, and a mayor who led a town council consisting of three local citizens. The village had maintained its status as an independent entity since its incorporation in 1822. However, on 17 October 2020 the former municipalities of Vogorno, Sonogno, Corippo, Brione (Verzasca) and Frasco merged to form the new municipality of Verzasca with a combined population of then 640.

== Description ==
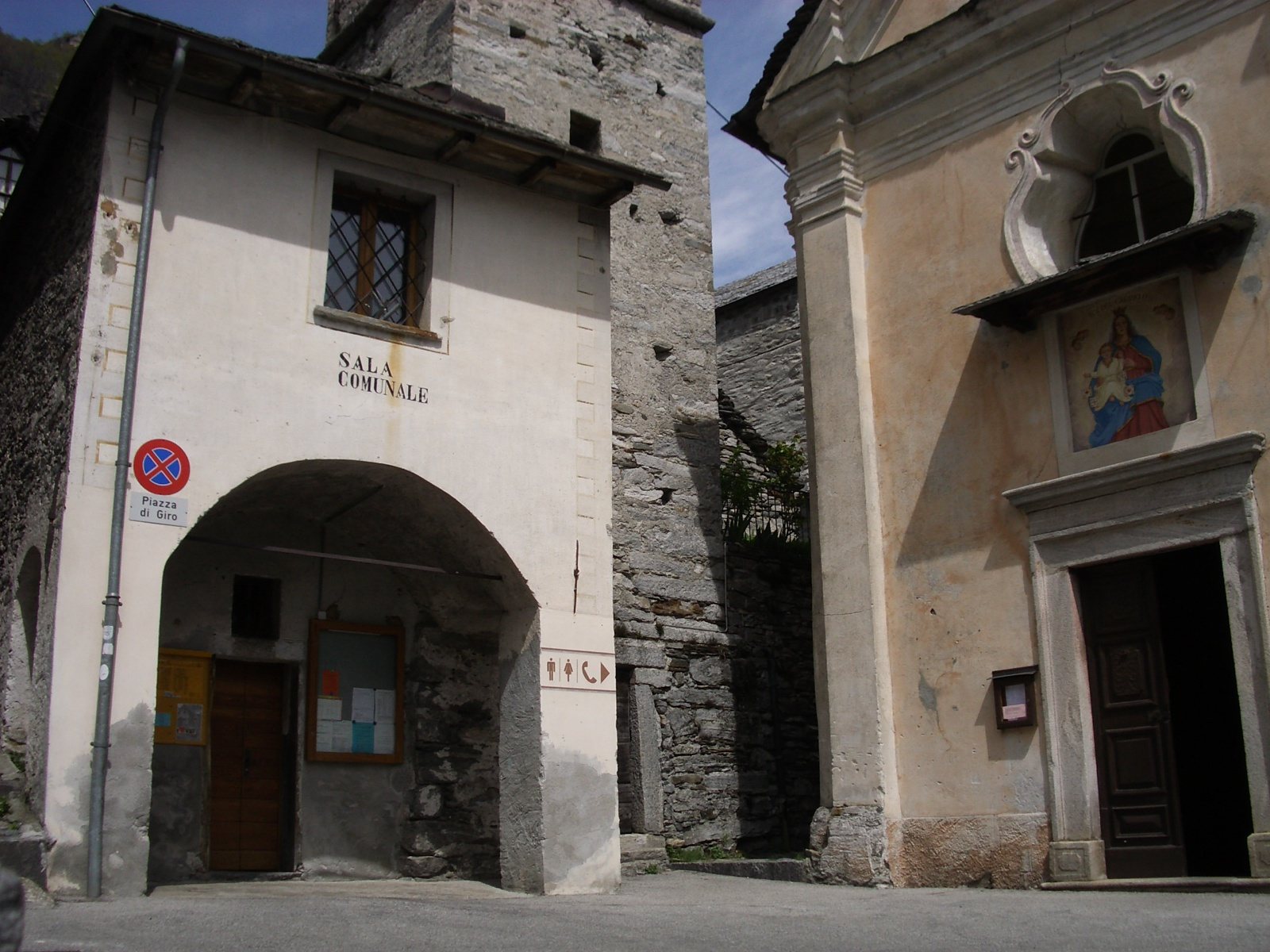
Corippo

Corippo is a mountain village in the Verzasca valley some 12 kilometers (7.5 mi) from Locarno, at the north end of the artificial Lake Vogorno and 20 km (12 mi) from the border with Italy. The houses are built from the local Ticino granite with slate roofs and have changed little for several hundred years, leading the Italian writer Piero Bianconi to describe Corippo as "Verzasca's gentlest village". Its early 17th century Church of the Blessed Virgin Annunciata (later the Blessed Virgin Carmine) was extended in the late eighteenth century. Corippo's architectural value has caused the entire village centre to be placed under a conservation order, and in 1975 the European Architectural Heritage Congress named the village as an "exemplary model" for historical preservation.

Corippo was originally part of the larger parish and commune of Vogorno (though maintaining a certain degree of autonomy), before becoming a fully independent municipality in 1822. The village first became connected to the wider world in 1883 when a road was built linking it to the Verzasca valley road.

Depopulation has been a long-standing problem of the commune as scarceness of agricultural resources has driven the inhabitants, historically farmers and herdsmen, to move out to more populated areas, and within the last hundred and fifty years the village census has declined by over 94%.

== History ==
Corippo is first mentioned in 1224 as Culipo. In 1374 it was mentioned as Quorippo.

== Geography ==
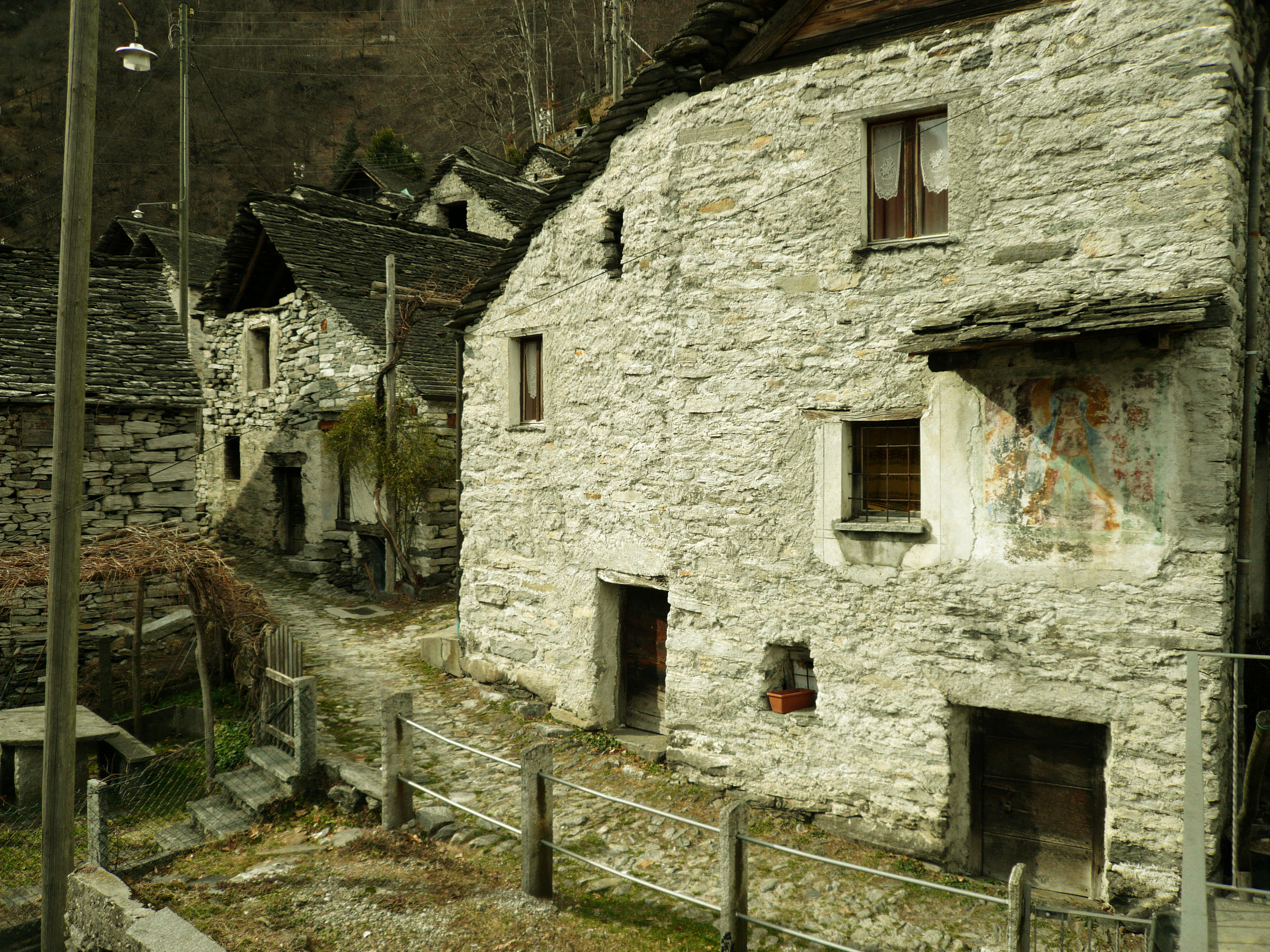
Corippo

Aerial view (1946)

Corippo had an area, as of 1997, of 7.73 square kilometers (2.98 sq mi). Of this area, 0.07 km^{2} (0.027 sq mi) or 0.9% is used for agricultural purposes, while 4.95 km^{2} (1.91 sq mi) or 64.0% is forested. Of the rest of the land, 0.02 km^{2} (4.9 acres) or 0.3% is settled (buildings or roads), 0.33 km^{2} (0.13 sq mi) or 4.3% is either rivers or lakes and 1.81 km^{2} (0.70 sq mi) or 23.4% is unproductive land.

Of the built up area, housing and buildings made up 0.1% and transportation infrastructure made up 0.1%. Out of the forested land, 51.2% of the total land area is heavily forested and 3.4% is covered with orchards or small clusters of trees. Of the agricultural land, 0.8% is used for growing crops. Of the water in the municipality, 2.5% is in lakes and 1.8% is in rivers and streams. Of the unproductive areas, 17.5% is unproductive vegetation and 6.0% is too rocky for vegetation.

The village is located in the Locarno district, on the western slope of the Verzasca valley, above the lake. It consists of the haufendorf village (an irregular, unplanned and quite closely packed village, built around a central square) of Corippo.

== Coat of arms ==
The blazon of the municipal coat of arms is Argent a chamois sable statant on a coupeaux vert.

== Demographics ==
Corippo had a population (as of December 2019) of 9. As of 2008, 5.6% of the population were resident foreign nationals. Most of the population (as of 2000) speaks Italian (86.4%), with the rest speaking German.

As of 2008, the gender distribution of the population was 53.3% male and 46.7% female. The population was made up of 7 Swiss men (46.7% of the population), and 1 (6.7%) non-Swiss man. There were 7 Swiss women (46.7%), and 0 non-Swiss women. In 2008 there was 1 death of Swiss citizens. The total Swiss population change in 2008 (from all sources) was a decrease of 1 which represents a population growth rate of -5.3%.

The age distribution in Corippo as of 2009 is as follows. There are no children or teenagers between 0 and 19 years old. Of the adult population, no one is between 20 and 29 years old. One person is between 30 and 39, one person is between 40 and 49, and one person is between 50 and 59. The senior population distribution is five people or 33.3% of the population between 60 and 69 years old, four people or 26.7% between 70 and 79, and three people or 20.0% who are over 80.

As of 2000, there were 11 private households in the municipality, and an average of 1.9 persons per household. In 2000 there were 66 single family homes (or 98.5% of the total) out of a total of 67 inhabited buildings. There was also 1 building in the municipality that was a multipurpose building (used for both housing and commercial or another purpose).

The vacancy rate for the municipality, in 2008, was 0%. In 2000 there were 67 apartments in the municipality. The most common apartment size was the 2 room apartment of which there were 30. There were 15 single room apartments and apartments with five or more rooms. Of these apartments, a total of 11 apartments (16.4% of the total) were permanently occupied, while 56 apartments (83.6%) were seasonally occupied. As of 2007, the construction rate of new housing units was 0 new units per 1000 residents.

The historical population is given in the following table:

year	population
1669	41 Households
1795	269
1850	294
1900	196
1950	73
2000	22
2004	17
2010	15
2016	14
2018	11
2019	9

== Sights ==
The entire village of Corippo is designated as part of the Inventory of Swiss Heritage Sites.

== Politics ==
In the 2007 federal election the most popular party was the Ticino League which received 38.46% of the vote. The next three most popular parties were the CVP (36.54%), the SP (7.69%) and the SVP (7.69%). In the federal election, a total of 13 votes were cast, and the voter turnout was 72.2%.

In the 2007 Gran Consiglio election, there were a total of 18 registered voters in Corippo, of which 12 or 66.7% voted. 1 blank ballot was cast, leaving 11 valid ballots in the election. The most popular party was the CVP+GenGiova which received 5 or 45.5% of the vote. The next three most popular parties were; the Ticino League (with 3 or 27.3%), the SP (with 1 or 9.1%) and the SVP (with 1 or 9.1%).

In the 2007 Consiglio di Stato election, the most popular party was the CVP which received 5 or 41.7% of the vote. The next three most popular parties were; the Ticino League (with 3 or 25.0%), the SSI (with 2 or 16.7%) and the SP (with 1 or 8.3%).

== Economy ==
In 2007, Corippo had an unemployment rate of 0%. As of 2005, there were 3 people employed in the primary economic sector and about 1 business involved in this sector. No one was employed in the secondary sector or tertiary sector. There were 9 residents of the municipality who were employed in some capacity, of which females made up 22.2% of the workforce.

In 2000, there were 6 workers who commuted away from the municipality. Of the working population, 0% used public transportation to get to work, and 66.7% used a private car.

As of September 2017, the mayor was the only resident still employed, the other 15 being retired, and it was planned to restore some of the many vacant houses in the village and create an albergo diffuso.

== Religion ==
From the 2000 census, 21 or 95.5% were Roman Catholic, while 0 belonged to the Swiss Reformed Church and 1 person belonged to another church (not listed on the census).
