= Bürgergemeinde =

Statutory corporation in public law in Switzerland

The Bürgergemeinde (also Burgergemeinde, Ortsgemeinde, Ortsbürgergemeinde, Tagwen, commune bourgeoise, vischnanca burgaisa; English: citizens' community) is a statutory corporation in public law in Switzerland. It includes all individuals who are citizens of the Bürgergemeinde, usually by having inherited the Bourgeoisie (citizenship), regardless of where they were born or where they may currently live. Membership of the Bürgergemeinde of a municipality is not to be confused with holding the municipality's citizenship, which, in certain cantons such as Valais, are two distinct legal concepts. Instead of the place of birth, Swiss legal documents, e.g. passports, contain the Heimatort (place of origin). It is, however, possible for a person to not possess bourgeoisie of the municipality from which they originate; laws relating to these matters vary depending on the canton in which the Bürgergemeinde is located. The Bürgergemeinde also often holds and administers the common property which had been bequeathed or otherwise given to the members of the bourgeoisie. The political communes or municipalities, the parish and the Bürgergemeinde often include the same area but may be separate depending on the relevant cantonal law. With the increase in mobility since the first half of the 19th century, the Bürgergemeinde and the rights associated with citizenship in the municipality have lost most of their meaning. Today, in Switzerland there are nearly 2000 Bürgergemeinden and corporations.

It is not to be confused with the urban patriciate, a social and political elite of the Old Swiss Confederacy that monopolized municipal councils and offices.

== Names ==
The Bürgergemeinde is known by different names in individual cantons. These names include: bourgeoisie (in Valais and Fribourg), commune bourgeois in Jura, Burgergemeinde (Bern, Valais), Ortsbürgergemeinde (Uri, Aargau), Ortsgemeinde (St. Gallen, Thurgau), vischnanca burgaisa (Graubünden) or Tagwen (Glarus). In Ticino, they are called patriziati, which emerged from the so-called vicinanze and are their legal successor. In the cantons of Zurich, Lucerne, Nidwalden, Schwyz, Glarus, Schaffhausen, Appenzell Ausserrhoden, Appenzell Innerrhoden, Neuchâtel, Geneva, and Vaud there are no Bürgergemeinden with the political communes handle the associated responsibilities. In Nidwalden, Schwyz, and Appenzell Innerrhoden, however, there are privately organized corporations (German: Korporationsgemeinde) that operate in much the same way.

The various types of Bürgergemeinden indicate the large differences in the degree of organization, powers and responsibilities that they hold throughout Switzerland. While in many cantons the political municipalities holds the power to make and implement policy, in some cities the Bürgergemeinde has right to self-government, and can have its own executive council. In Basel and Bern the Bürgergemeinden even have their own legislative assembly. In some cantons, the Bürgergemeinde still grants municipal citizenship, which is a fundamental aspect of the process of naturalisation. In addition, in many cantons the Bürgergemeinde is active in the local community. It may run hospitals, retirement and youth homes, provide scholarships and support the unemployed, the disabled and addicts. Some Bürgergemeinden also provide cultural services, such as supporting libraries and museums. To cover these tasks, the Bürgergemeinde may collect taxes or interest, or use their community assets (such as fields, farms and woods).

== History ==
The beginnings of the modern municipality system date back to the Helvetic Republic. Under the Old Swiss Confederacy, citizenship was granted by each town and village only to residents. These citizens enjoyed access to community property and in some cases additional protection under the law. Additionally, the urban towns and the rural villages had differing rights and laws. The creation of Helvetic citizenship, which gave equality to citizens of the old towns and their tenants and servants, led to conflict. The wealthier villagers and urban citizens held rights to forests, common lands and other municipal properties which they did not wish to share with the newly enfranchised, who were generally poor. The compromise solution, which was written into the municipal laws of the Helvetic Republic, is still valid today. Two politically separate but often geographically similar organizations were created. The first, the so-called municipality, was a political community formed by election and its voting body consists of all resident citizens. However, the community land and property remained with the former local citizens who were gathered together into the Bürgergemeinde. During the Mediation era (1803–1814), and especially during the Restoration era (1814–1830), certain canton, having regained independence, revoked the reforms that the French-imposed Helvetic Republic had implemented. In the Regeneration era (1830–1848), the liberal revolutions of the common people helped to restore some rights again in a few cantons. In other cantons, the Bürgergemeinden were able to maintain power as political communities. In the canton of Zurich the Municipal Act of 1866 brought the political municipality back into existence.

The relationship between the political municipality and the Bürgergemeinde was often dominated by the latter's ownership of community property. Often the administration and profits made from the property were retained by the Bürgergemeinden, leaving the political municipality dependent on the Bürgergemeinde for money and use of the property. It was not until the political municipalities acquired rights over property that served the public (such as schools, fire stations, etc.) and taxes, that they obtained full independence. For example, in the city of Bern, the property division of 1852 gave the political municipality the right to levy taxes.

The Federal Constitution of 1874 removed discrimination based on one's place and canton of origin and all male Swiss citizens were granted equal political rights. This revised constitution finally removed all the political voting and electoral body rights from the Bürgergemeinde. In the cities, the percentage of members in the Bürgergemeinde in the population was reduced as a result of increasing migration from rural areas to the cities. This led to the Bürgergemeinde losing its former importance to a large extent. Nevertheless, the institution was not fundamentally challenged in certain cantons. This may be due, primarily, to the tradition of the Bürgergemeinde providing relief to the poor in certain cantons. This tradition dates back to the 16th century. In the 20th century, this was taken over by the Federal Social Welfare organization, and later by cantonal governments. However, in some cantons Bürgergemeinden have voluntarily remained active participants in the provision of social welfare. In many other cantons, e.g. the canton of Lucerne, the Bürgergemeinde and political municipality have merged into each other.

== See also ==
- Communes of Switzerland
- Degagna
- Burgrecht
