= Angelo Monotti =

Swiss photographer (1835–1915)

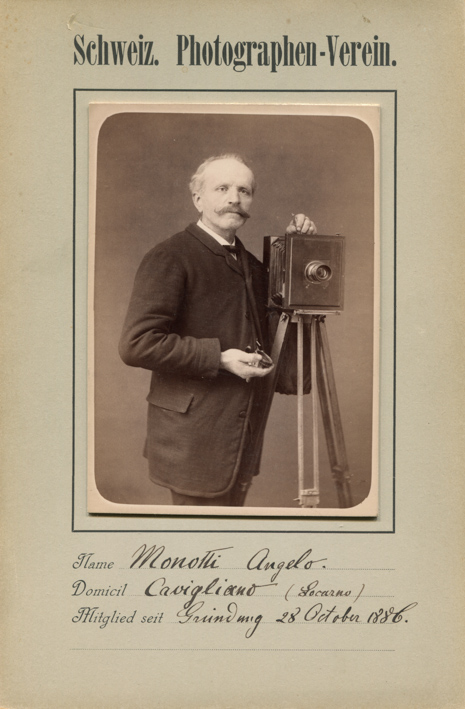
- Angelo Monotti
- Born: 24 February 1835; Cavigliano, Canton Ticino, Switzerland
- Died: 5 June 1915 (aged 80); Cavigliano, Canton Ticino, Switzerland
- Known for: Photography

Angelo Monotti (Cavigliano, February 24, 1835 – June 5, 1915) was a Swiss photographer, considered one of the pioneers of photography in the Canton of Ticino together with Antonio Rossi.

== Early life ==
The son of Giacinto Monotti and Maddalena Selna, he had two brothers, Alessandro and Clemente. He trained as a cabinetmaker in Livorno, where his father and grandfather were active in the wine trade. In 1858 he married Maria Maestretti, a landowner from Verscio, with whom he had five children: Giacinto, Silvio, Alice, Angelina and Valentino.

== Career ==
In 1860, Monotti began working at Giuseppe Marzocchini's studio, where he became acquainted with photography and came into contact with, among others, Alphonse Bernoud and Carlo Neopolo Bettini. He devoted a significant part of his work to portraiture and landscape photography, and also produced postcards and stereoscopies.

Returning to the Canton of Ticino in 1873, he opened the photographic studio La Galleria the following year, becoming one of the first professional photographers active in the canton. After establishing a studio in Cavigliano, he opened a second atelier in Locarno in 1895.

Alongside his artistic activity, he was also active in politics: between 1876 and 1888, he served two consecutive terms as conservative mayor of his hometown. During his tenure, he continued his photographic work, documenting, among other subjects, the construction of the Centovalli road.

His fourth son, Valentino, followed in his footsteps and inherited the photographic studio.

== Monotti photographic collection ==
In 2008, the Angelo and Valentino Monotti Photographic Collection was established at the Archivio di Stato del Cantone Ticino, in collaboration with Memoriav, the Lugano Cantonal Art Museum and the Visual Culture Laboratory of the University of Applied Sciences and Arts of Southern Switzerland (SUPSI).

The archive contains approximately 2,500 photographs donated by the heirs, of which 609 are works by Angelo (222 negatives and 387 prints) and the remainder by his son Valentino. About a hundred images are attributed to other authors, including a daguerreotype by Alphonse Bernoud. The collection has been restored, preserved and digitized, and has been held at the State Archives of the Canton of Ticino since 2008, when it was donated to the institution by the heirs.
