= SUPSI =

Public Swiss university

University of Applied Sciences and Arts of Southern Switzerland
- Scuola universitaria professionale della Svizzera italiana
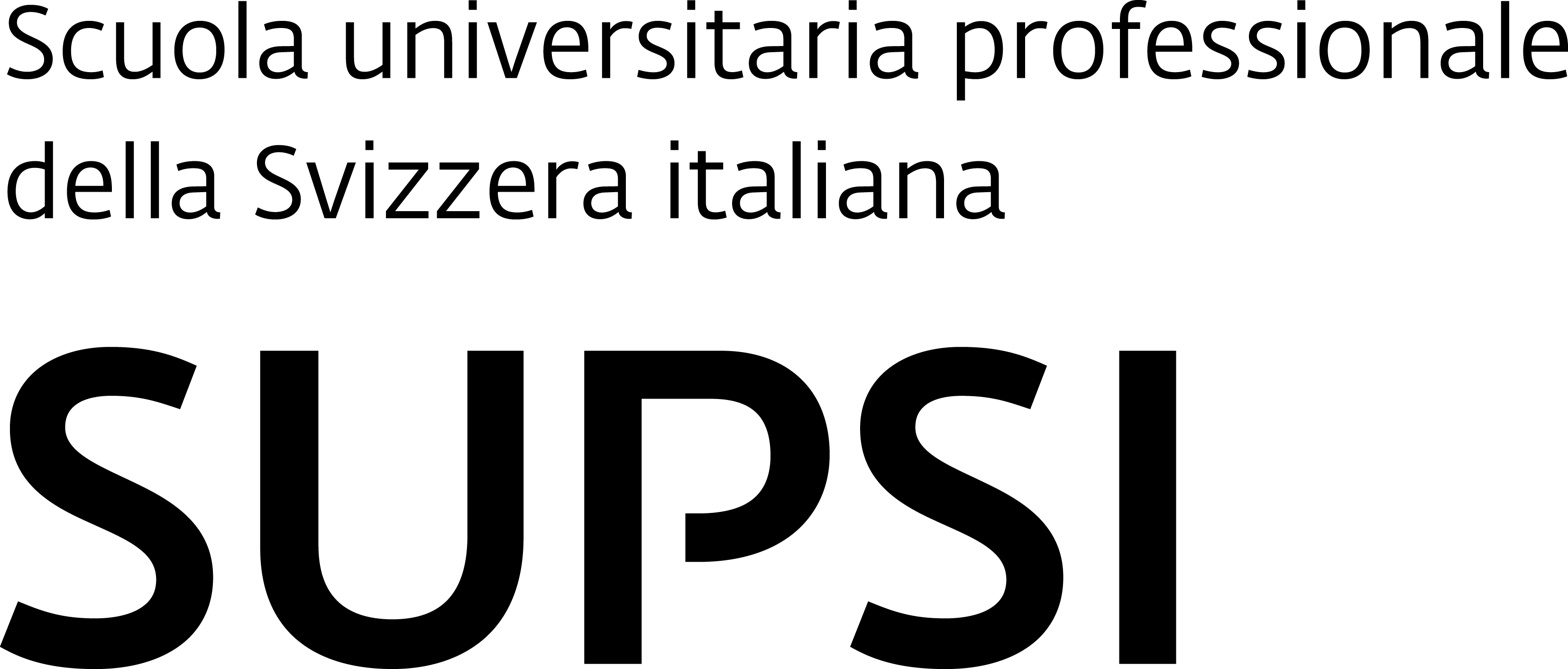
- Type: Public; Swiss University of Applied Sciences and Arts, Fachhochschule, Haute école specialisée
- Established: 1997; 29 years ago
- President: Giovanni Merlini
- Rector: Franco Gervasoni, director
- Administrative staff: 794
- Students: 3,681 (bachelors and masters) + 5,505 continuing education
- Undergraduates: 3,164
- Postgraduates: 517
- Location: Manno, Canobbio, Brig, Landquart, Locarno, Lugano e Verscio, Canton Ticino, Switzerland; 46.0233°N 8.9172°E
- Language: Italian, English, German
- Website: supsi.ch

The University of Applied Sciences and Arts of Southern Switzerland (SUPSI, Italian: Scuola universitaria professionale della Svizzera italiana) is a public vocational university located in Ticino, Switzerland. It offers over 30 bachelor's and master's programs, blending theoretical scientific knowledge with practical technological applications in real-world projects. Instruction is mainly in Italian, with some courses delivered in English and German.

== History ==
SUPSI was established on 11 March 1997 by Canton Ticino and it received federal recognition in 2003. The new institution integrates preexisting specialized schools and public and private research institutes which date back to 1852 with the Cantonal High School initiated by Carlo Cattaneo and providing higher education courses in mechanics and architecture.

In 1997 SUPSI integrates within its new organization:

- STS Electronic Engineering Section (established in Manno in 1993)
- SSQEA College for Financial and Administrative Managers (established by Canton Ticino in 1987 as a third cycle following the commercial schools)
- SSAA College of Applied Arts (established by Canton Ticino in Lugano in 1985 as a third cycle of the CSIA Educational Centre for Artistic Industry)
- ICIMSI Institute of Computer Integrated Manufacturing of Southern Switzerland (established in Manno in 1992 as a private-public initiative to develop applied research in support of industry)
- ICTS the Cantonal Experimental Technical Institution
- the Cantonal Office of Geology and Hydrology which becomes the Institute of Earth Science (IST).

In 1997 SUPSI is divided into four departments: Construction and Territory, Computer Science and Electronic Engineering, Applied Art and Business Administration.

In the following years other specialized schools and public and private research institutes were integrated:

- 1998 College of Social Work (established by Canton Ticino) becomes a department.
- 1999 IDSIA Dalle Molle Institute for Artificial Intelligence Research (established in Lugano in 1988); it is jointly run by Università della Svizzera italiana and SUPSI thanks to an agreement between the two institutions.
- 2004 Fernfachhochshule Schweiz (FFHS) based in Brig and with training centers in Basel, Bern and Zurich.
- 2006 Conservatorio della Svizzera italiana - Scuola Universitaria di Musica (Conservatory of Southern Switzerland/Ticino Music Conservatory)
- 2006 Accademia Teatro Dimitri (established in 1975 by the Swiss clown Dimitri as a school of movement theatre).
- 2007 Phsyiotherapie Graubünden (based in Landquart); Bachelor in Physiotherapy affiliated to the Department of Health Sciences.
- 2011 MAInD; Master of Arts in Interaction Design.

== Organization and administration ==
As a Swiss University of Applied Sciences (Fachhochschule, Haute école specialisée, scuola universitaria professionale), SUPSI is an autonomous organization, and it has a university status with a focus on professional training and applied research. Its four institutional mandates are first and second level university education (bachelor's degree and master's degree), continuing education, applied research and consulting and support services to businesses and institutions.

The governance of SUPSI is based on:

- SUPSI Council is composed of members nominated by the State Council of Canton Ticino and it has a mandate of strategic direction and control.
- SUPSI Board
- University administration includes the director, the head of shared services and the directors and deans of the departments and the associated schools.
- Departments and associated schools
- Consultative commissions. Each department and associated school has a Consultative Commission appointed by the SUPSI Board.

From a financial point of view, SUPSI is supported by Ticino cantonal contributions, contributions from the Swiss Confederation and is self-financing. The support of Canton Ticino is regulated by a performance contract based on the number of students enrolled and on the volume of projects acquired.

=== Departments and associated schools ===
SUPSI is organized in departments and associated schools. The associated schools are managed by private institutions, and they are integrated within SUPSI general administration. Departments include institutes, laboratories, and centres of expertise; they are organized in academic disciplines.

Due to the progressive integration of preexisting specialized schools and public and private research institutes, the structure of the departments changes through time

==== Department for Environment, Constructions and Design ====
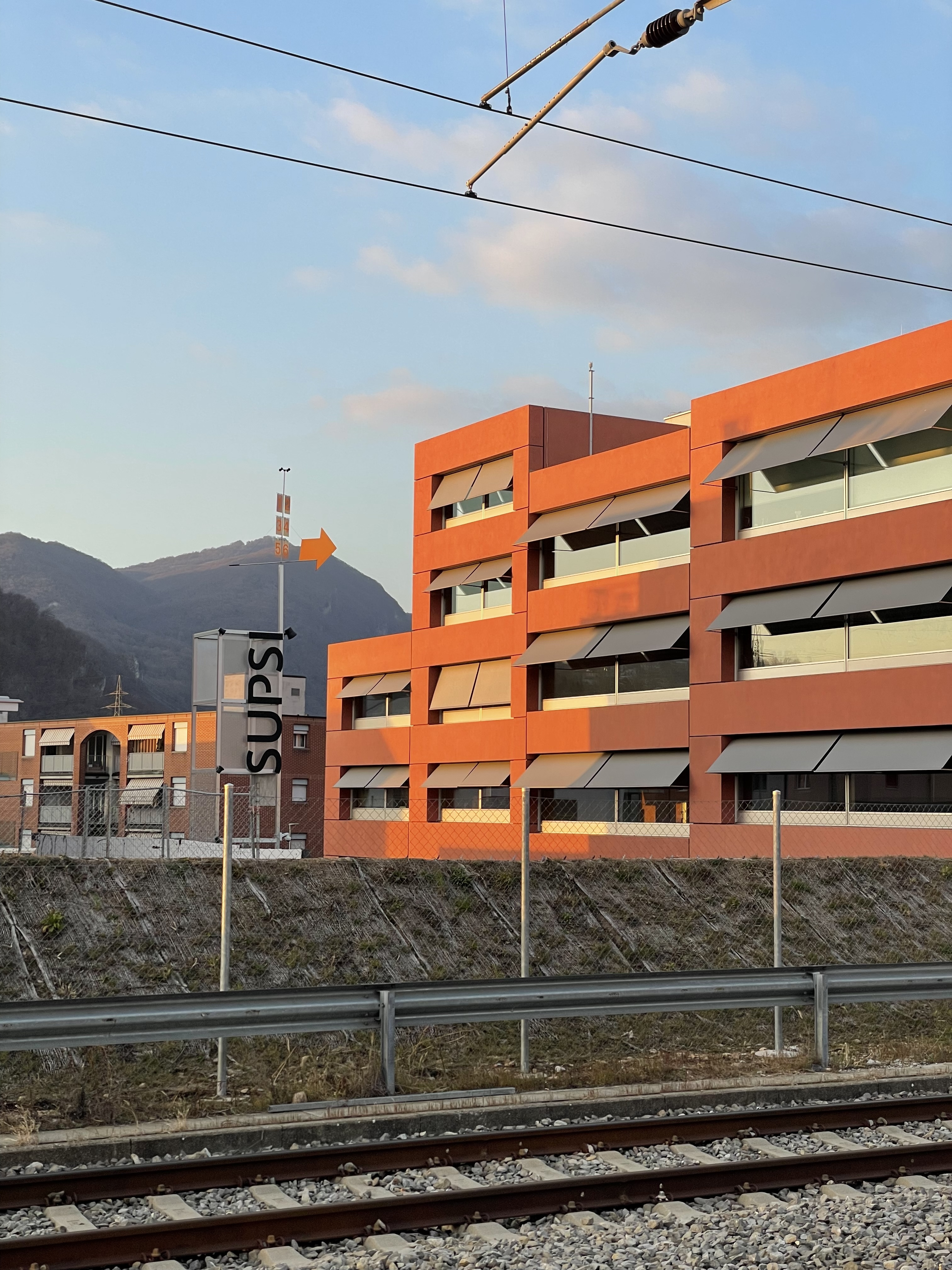
The view of the SUPSI Campus DACD in Mendrisio

- Institute for Materials and Constructions
- Institute of Earth Sciences
- Institute for Applied Sustainability to the Built Environment
- Institute of Design
- Laboratory of Applied Microbiology

==== Department of Business Economics, Health and Social Care ====
The departments works in basic training, continuing education, research and services.

- Inno3 Competence Centre
- Tax Law Competence Centre
- Laboratory of methodology and statistics
- Medical Humanities Centre

==== Department of Innovative Technologies ====
The focus of the Department of Innovative Technologies is applied engineering sciences in the industrial sector, technological and IT services for both educational and research purposes. Within the department there are:

- Institute CIM (Computer Integrated Manufacturing) for Sustainable Innovation.
- AI Lab IDSIA Institute Dalle Molle for Artificial Intelligence.
- Institute for Information Systems and Networking
- Institute for Systems and Applied Electronics
- Institute of Systems and Technologies for Sustainable Production

==== Department of Teaching and Learning ====
The department works in education, research and services.

==== Associated schools ====
1. Accademia Teatro Dimitri
2. Conservatorio della Svizzera italiana
3. Fernfachhochschule Schweiz

== Campus ==
SUPSI is located in southern Switzerland, in cantons Ticino, Valais and Graubünden.

Location	Centres	Facilities	Note
Mendrisio	Department of Environment Constructions and Design		
Manno	Supsi Directorship, Department of Business, Health and Social Care	Day nursery	
Locarno	Department of Teaching and Learning	Day nursery	
Lugano	Department of Innovative Technologies and Conservatorio della Svizzera italiana	Day nursery	
Verscio	Accademia Teatro Dimitri		
Brig	Fernfachhochschule Schweiz		
Landquart	Physiotherapie Graubünden		

== Academics ==
The first SUPSI diplomas are awarded in 2000 in architecture, civil engineering, computer science, electronic engineering, interior design, visual communication, conservation and restoration, business administration and social work. In 2001 the Canton Ticino Chamber of Commerce for Industry and Craftsmanship, the Association of Ticino Industries, the Ticino Banking Association and by Ticino Section Swiss Construction Companies establish the Ticino Economy Prize (Premio dell'Economia Ticinese) for the best SUPSI graduates; in 2011 the Prize Talenthesis is established.

=== Undergraduate programme (Bachelor's degree) ===
Field	Bachelor	Location	Centre	Language
Architecture, Construction and Planning	Architecture	Mendrisio	Department for Environment Constructions and Design	Italian
Architecture, Construction and Planning	Civil engineering	Mendrisio	Department for Environment Constructions and Design	Italian
Design	Conservation	Mendrisio	Department for Environment Constructions and Design	Italian
Design	Interior design	Mendrisio	Department for Environment Constructions and Design/Laboratory of Visual Culture	Italian
Design	Visual communication	Mendrisio	Department for Environment Constructions and Design/Laboratory of Visual Culture	Italian
Business Management and Services	Business administration	Manno	Department of Business and Social Sciences	Italian
Teacher Training	Pre-primary school teacher training	Locarno	Department of Formation and Learning	Italian
Teacher Training	Primary school teacher training	Locarno	Department of Formation and Learning	Italian
Social Work	Social Work	Manno	Department of Business and Social Sciences	Italian
Music, Theatre and Art	Music	Lugano	Conservatorio della Svizzera italian	Italian
Music, Theatre and Art	Music and movement	Lugano	Department for Environment Constructions and Design	Italian
Music, Theatre and Art	Theater	Verscio	Scuola Teatro Dimitri	Italian
Health	Occupational therapy	Manno	Department of Health Sciences	Italian
Health	Physiotherapy	Manno	Department of Health Sciences	Italian
Health	Nursing	Manno	Department of Health Sciences	Italian
Health	Physiotherapy (Landquart)	Landquart	Department of Health Sciences	German
Engineering and IT	Computer science	Lugano	Department of Innovative Technologies	Italian
Engineering and IT	Electrical engineering	Lugano	Department of Innovative Technologies	Italian
Engineering and IT	Engineering and management	Lugano	Department of Innovative Technologies	Italian
Engineering and IT	Mechanical engineering	Lugano	Department of Innovative Technologies	Italian

=== Graduate programme (Master's degree) ===
Field	Master	Location	Centre	Language
Design	Conservation-restoration	Canobbio	Department for Environment Constructions and Design	Italian
Design	Master of Arts in Interior-Architectural Design (IMIAD)	Canobbio	Department for Environment Constructions and Design	English
Design	Master of Advanced Studies in Interaction Design (MAIND)	Canobbio	Department for Environment Constructions and Design	English
Design	Master of Arts in Filmmaking (Regia cinematografica)	Canobbio	Department for Environment Constructions and Design in the frame of Réseau Cinéma CH	English
Business Management and Services	Business administration	Brig	Fernfachhochschule Schweiz	German
Business Management and Services	Business administration	Manno	Department of Business and Social Sciences	Italian
Social Work	Travail social (Social work)	Department of Business and Social Sciences	Lausanne (mainly)	French
Teacher Training	Middle school teacher training	Locarno	Department of Formation and Learning	Italian
Teacher Training	Secondary school teacher training (upper middle school)	Locarno	Department of Formation and Learning	Italian (some lessons German, French)
Engineering and IT	Engineering	Manno	Department of Innovative Technologies	Italian, French, German, English
Engineering and IT	Informatics	Manno	Department of Innovative Technologies	English
Music, Theatre and Art	Music composition and theory	Lugano	Conservatorio della Svizzera italiana	Italian
Music, Theatre and Art	Music pedagogy	Lugano	Conservatorio della Svizzera italiana	Italian
Music, Theatre and Art	Music performance	Lugano	Department for Environment Constructions and Design	Italian
Music, Theatre and Art	Specialized music performance	Lugano	Department for Environment Constructions and Design	Italian
Music, Theatre and Art	Theatre	Verscio	Scuola Teatro Dimitri	Italian

=== Continuing education ===
SUPSI provides further trainings and qualifications:

- Master of Advanced Studies (MAS)
- Executive Master of Business Administration (EMBA)
- Diploma of Advanced Studies (DAS)
- Certificate of Advanced Studies (CAS)

Typology	Field	Title	Location	Centre	Language
Master of Advanced Studies		MAS Tax Law	Manno	Department of Business and Social Sciences	
Executive Master of Business Administration		EMBA Executive Master of Business Administration	Manno	Department of Business and Social Sciences	
Master of Advanced Studies		MAS Clinica generale	Manno	Department of Business and Social Sciences	
Master of Advanced Studies		MAS Cultural Management	Manno	Department of Business and Social Sciences	
Master of Advanced Studies		MAS Gestione sanitaria	Manno	Department of Business and Social Sciences	
Master of Advanced Studies		MAS Human capital management	Manno	Department of Business and Social Sciences	
Master of Advanced Studies		MAS Industrial Engineering and Operations	Lugano		
Master of Advanced Studies		MAS IT Management and Governance	Lugano		
Master of Advanced Studies		MAS Library and Information Science	Lugano		
Master of Advanced Studies		MAS Mobile and Internet Applications	Lugano		
Diploma of Advanced Studies		DAS Gestione sanitaria	Manno		
Diploma of Advanced Studies		DAS Indirizzo clinico	Manno		
Diploma of Advanced Studies		DAS ICT Systems and Security			
Master of Advanced Studies	Design	MAS Interaction Design	Mendrisio	Department for Environment Constructions and Design/Laboratory of Visual Culture	English

== Research ==
A research service is co-managed by SUPSI and Università della Svizzera italiana.

== See also ==
- Education in Switzerland
- List of universities in Switzerland
- List of largest universities by enrollment in Switzerland
