= Gordemo =

- Village
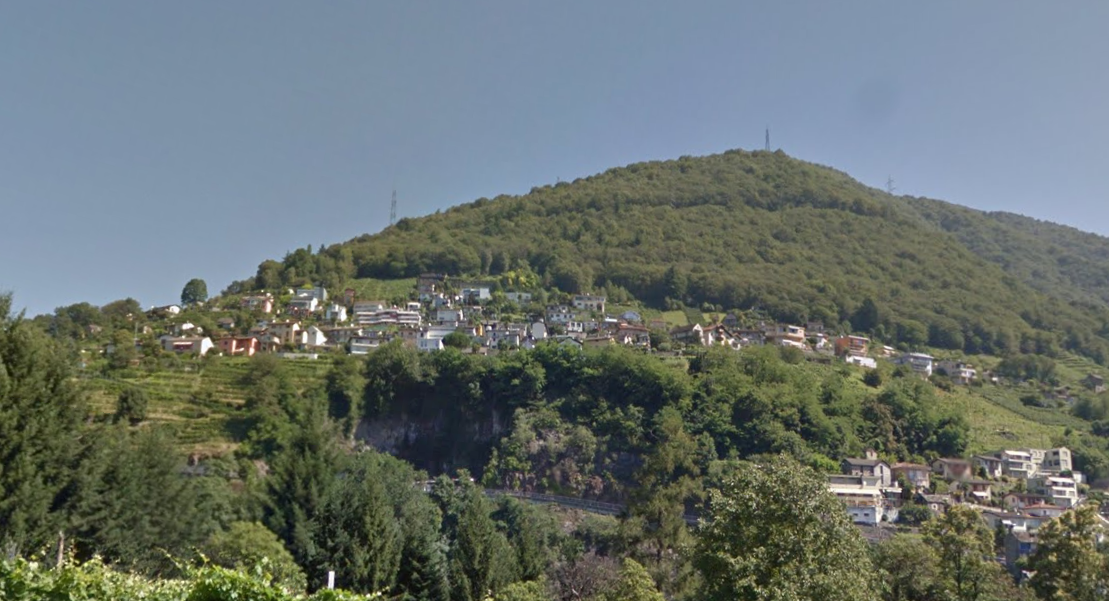

- Location in Switzerland
- Coordinates: 46°11′12.52″N 8°51′0.32″E
- Country: Switzerland
- Canton: Ticino
- District: Locarno
- Municipality: Gordola
- Elevation: 427 m (1,401 ft)

Population (2015)
  - Total: 200+
- Time zone: UTC+1

Gordemo is a hillside village in Locarno District, Switzerland, to the northwest of Gordola. It is notably located close to the Verzasca Dam, about 800 metres (1/2 mi) downstream in the valleyside (Valle Verzasca).
