= Dimitri (clown) =

Swiss clown (1935–2016)

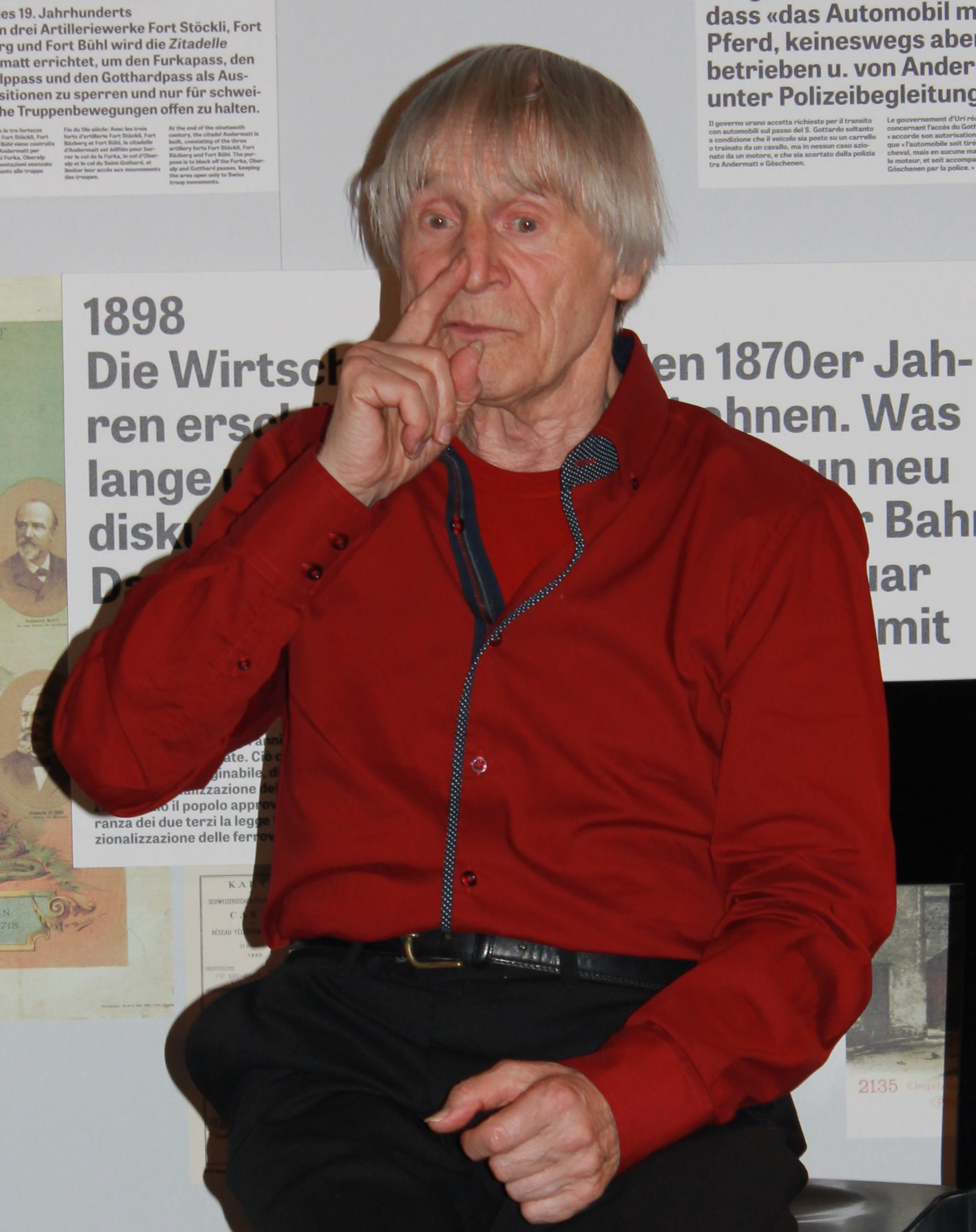
- Dimitri in 2016
- Born: Dimitri Jakob Müller; 18 September 1935; Ascona, Switzerland
- Died: 19 July 2016 (aged 80); Borgnone, Ticino, Switzerland
- Occupation: Clown

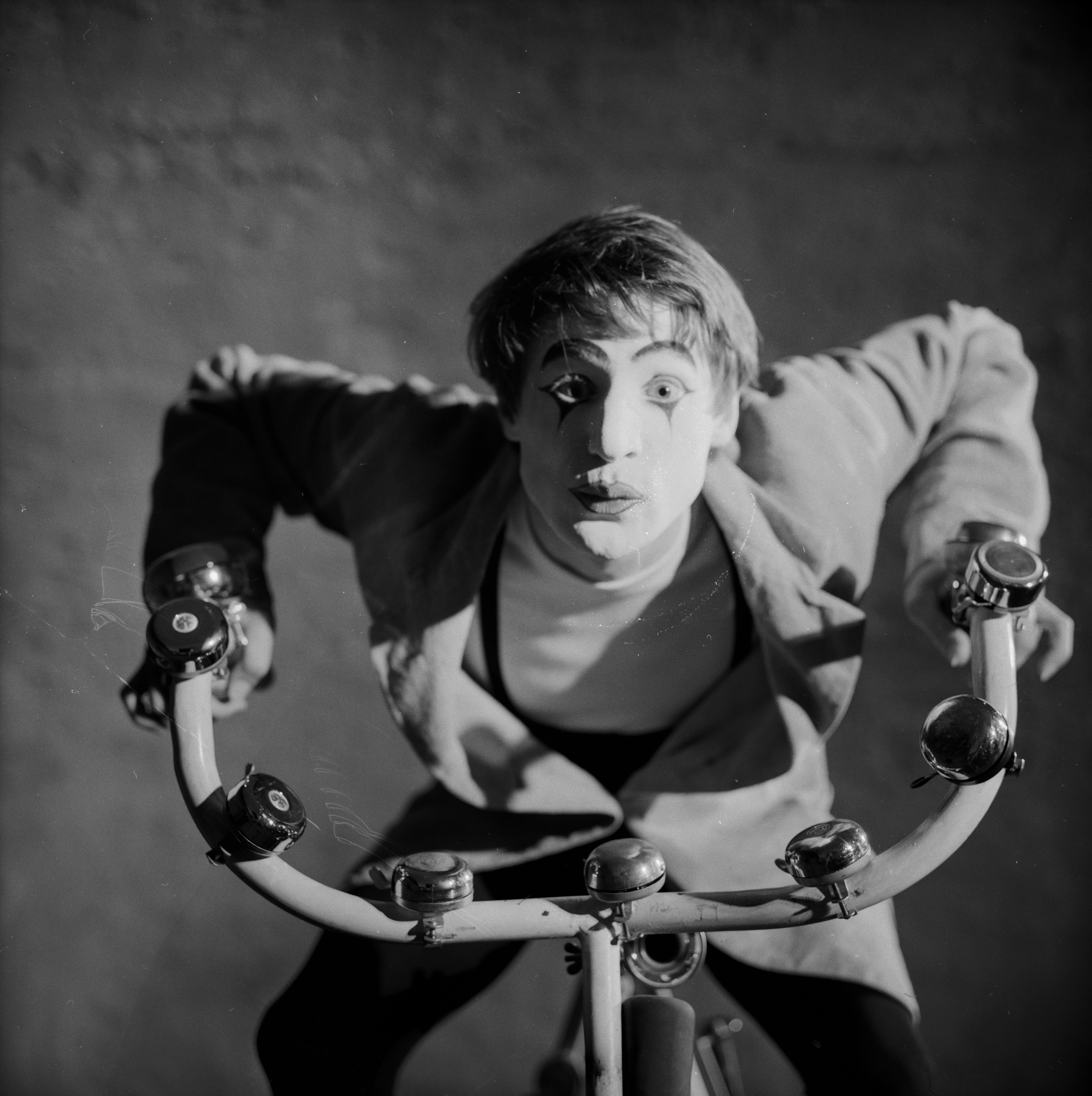
Dimitri 1962

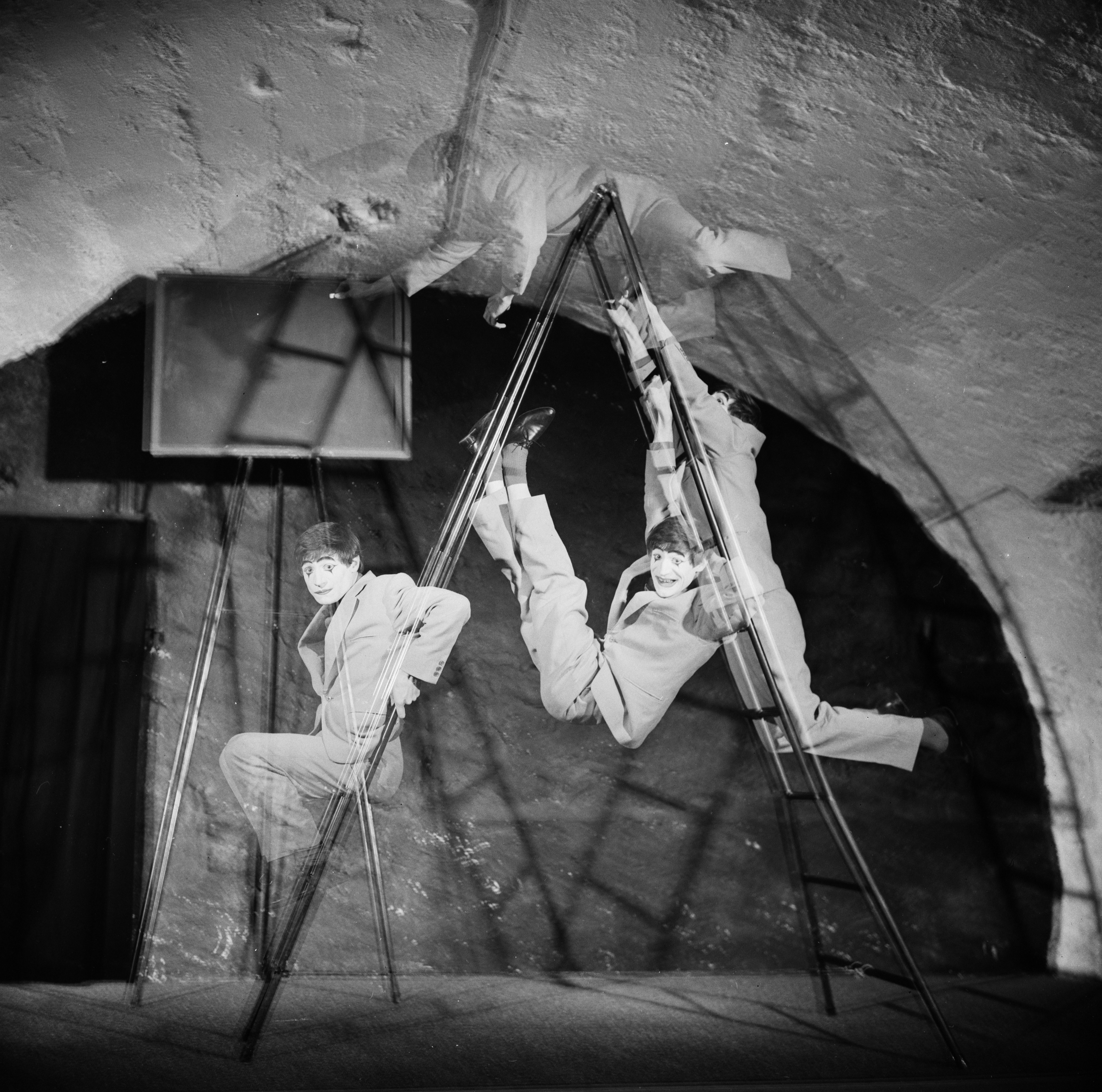
In Ascona 1962

Dimitri Jakob Muller (18 September 1935 – 19 July 2016), known as Dimitri was a Swiss clown and mime artist. He later changed his name to Jakob Dimitri.

== Career ==
Dimitri was born in Ascona, Switzerland in 1935. When he was seven years old he decided he wanted to become a clown. After graduating from school, Dimitri became an apprentice potter while studying music and theater. He went to Paris to study under Etienne Decroux, then Marcel Marceau.

In 1959, he was hired as an Auguste by Louise Maisse, a whiteface clown. He then created his own solo mime act which was received with much acclaim during the 1962 International Mime Festival in Berlin. In 1971, Dimitri founded with his wife Gunda a theater. In 1975, he founded the Scuola Teatro Dimitri in Verscio, now Terre di Pedemonte. It is a small performing arts college in the Swiss national higher education system. In 1973, he was awarded the Grock prize, and appeared with New York's Big Apple Circus. He has also performed in many other countries across the globe. He was inducted into the International Clown Hall of Fame in 1995.

== Death ==
He died at the age of 80 on 19 July 2016 in Borgnone, Ticino.

== Style ==
Dimitri preferred performing solo in theaters with a few props and no scenery. His act was motivated with his comic logic and playful spirit allowing him to incorporate a wide variety of circus skills. Interaction with the audience was an integral part of both his stage acts. The finale of his show was to play four saxophones simultaneously. He was a published author and songwriter, and operated a theater company with his wife Gunda, in Verscio, in the canton of Ticino in the Italian speaking part of Switzerland.
