= Locarno District =

Coordinates: 46°10′N 8°48′E

Locarno District Distretto di Locarno
- District
- Country: Switzerland
- Canton: Ticino
- Capital: Locarno

Area
  - Total: 591.67 km^{2} (228.45 sq mi)

Population (2020)
  - Total: 63,774
  - Density: 107.79/km^{2} (279.17/sq mi)
- Time zone: UTC+1 (CET)
  - Summer (DST): UTC+2 (CEST)
- Municipalities: 23

The Locarno District (also called Locarnese) is a district of Canton Ticino, Switzerland. It has a population of 63,774 (as of 31 December 2020).

== Geography ==
The Locarno District has an area, as of 1997, of 551.08 square kilometers (212.77 sq mi). Of this area, 35.25 km^{2} (13.61 sq mi) or 6.4% is used for agricultural purposes, while 320.45 km^{2} (123.73 sq mi) or 58.1% is forested. Of the rest of the land, 26.96 km^{2} (10.41 sq mi) or 4.9% is settled (buildings or roads), 12.76 km^{2} (4.93 sq mi) or 2.3% is either rivers or lakes and 133.75 km^{2} (51.64 sq mi) or 24.3% is unproductive land.

Of the built up area, housing and buildings made up 2.8% and transportation infrastructure made up 1.2%. Out of the forested land, 47.1% of the total land area is heavily forested and 3.6% is covered with orchards or small clusters of trees. Of the agricultural land, 3.0% is used for growing crops and 2.8% is used for alpine pastures. Of the water in the district, 0.5% is in lakes and 1.9% is in rivers and streams. Of the unproductive areas, 14.7% is unproductive vegetation and 9.6% is too rocky for vegetation.

== Demographics ==
The Locarno District has a population (as of December 2020) of 63,774. Of the Swiss national languages (as of 2000), 8,831 speak German, 971 people speak French, 43,408 people speak Italian, and 83 people speak Romansh. The remainder (4,034 people) speak another language.

As of 2008, the gender distribution of the population was 47.5% male and 52.5% female. The population was made up of 21,828 Swiss men (35.1% of the population), and 7,688 (12.4%) non-Swiss men. There were 25,836 Swiss women (41.5%), and 6,847 (11.0%) non-Swiss women.

In 2008 there were 397 live births to Swiss citizens and 104 births to non-Swiss citizens, and in same time span there were 483 deaths of Swiss citizens and 86 non-Swiss citizen deaths. Ignoring immigration and emigration, the population of Swiss citizens decreased by 86 while the foreign population increased by 18. There were 29 Swiss men and 22 Swiss women who immigrated back to Switzerland. At the same time, there were 317 non-Swiss men and 269 non-Swiss women who immigrated from another country to Switzerland. The total Swiss population change in 2008 (from all sources) was an increase of 487 and the non-Swiss population change was an increase of 170 people. This represents a population growth rate of 1.1%.

The age distribution, as of 2009, in the Locarno District is: 5,081 children or 8.2% of the population are between 0 and 9 years old and 5,956 teenagers or 9.6% are between 10 and 19. Of the adult population, 6,214 people or 10.0% of the population are between 20 and 29 years old. 7,768 people or 12.5% are between 30 and 39, 10,299 people or 16.6% are between 40 and 49, and 8,443 people or 13.6% are between 50 and 59. The senior population distribution is 8,344 people or 13.4% of the population are between 60 and 69 years old, 6,067 people or 9.8% are between 70 and 79, there are 4,027 people or 6.5% who are over 80.

In 2000 there were 29,582 single family homes (or 45.4% of the total) out of a total of 65,150 inhabited buildings. There were 7,996 two family buildings (12.3%) and 20,959 multi-family buildings (32.2%). There were also 6,613 buildings in the district that were multipurpose buildings (used for both housing and commercial or another purpose).

In 2000 there were 43,636 apartments in the district. The most common apartment size was the 3 room apartment of which there were 13,418. There were 3,749 single room apartments and 6,608 apartments with five or more rooms. Of these apartments, a total of 26,170 apartments (60.0% of the total) were permanently occupied, while 16,398 apartments (37.6%) were seasonally occupied and 1,068 apartments (2.4%) were empty.

The historical population is given in the following table:

year	population
1850	22,362
1880	24,361
1900	24,594
1950	33,218
1980	50,778
1990	52,286
2000	57,327

== Politics ==
In the 2007 federal election the most popular party was the FDP which received 30.3% of the vote. The next three most popular parties were the CVP (21.47%), the SP (18.43%) and the SVP (11.71%). In the federal election, a total of 16,768 votes were cast, and the voter turnout was 42.5%.

In the 2007 Ticino Gran Consiglio election, there were a total of 39,570 registered voters in the Locarno District, of which 21,970 or 55.5% voted. 394 blank ballots and 50 null ballots were cast, leaving 21,526 valid ballots in the election. The most popular party was the PLRT which received 4,711 or 21.9% of the vote. The next three most popular parties were; the PPD+GenGiova (with 3,991 or 18.5%), the SSI (with 3,935 or 18.3%) and the PS (with 3,590 or 16.7%).

In the 2007 Ticino Consiglio di Stato election, 242 blank ballots and 99 null ballots were cast, leaving 21,637 valid ballots in the election. The most popular party was the PLRT which received 4,349 or 20.1% of the vote. The next three most popular parties were; the PS (with 4,243 or 19.6%), the PPD (with 4,076 or 18.8%) and the LEGA (with 4,057 or 18.8%).

== Religion ==
From the 2000 census, 41,145 or 71.8% were Roman Catholic, while 6,229 or 10.9% belonged to the Swiss Reformed Church. There are 7,244 individuals (or about 12.64% of the population) who belong to another church (not listed on the census), and 2,709 individuals (or about 4.73% of the population) did not answer the question.

== Education ==
In the Locarno District there was a total of 9,332 students (as of 2009). The Ticino education system provides up to three years of non-mandatory kindergarten and in the Locarno District there were 1,319 children in kindergarten. The primary school program lasts for five years and includes both a standard school and a special school. In the district, 2,781 students attended the standard primary schools and 148 students attended the special school. In the lower secondary school system, students either attend a two-year middle school followed by a two-year pre-apprenticeship or they attend a four-year program to prepare for higher education. There were 2,410 students in the two-year middle school and 37 in their pre-apprenticeship, while 947 students were in the four-year advanced program.

The upper secondary school includes several options, but at the end of the upper secondary program, a student will be prepared to enter a trade or to continue on to a university or college. In Ticino, vocational students may either attend school while working on their internship or apprenticeship (which takes three or four years) or may attend school followed by an internship or apprenticeship (which takes one year as a full-time student or one and a half to two years as a part-time student). There were 478 vocational students who were attending school full-time and 1,080 who attend part-time.

The professional program lasts three years and prepares a student for a job in engineering, nursing, computer science, business, tourism and similar fields. There were 132 students in the professional program.

== Circles and municipalities ==
Circolo di Locarno
Flag	Coat of arms	Municipality	Population (31 December 2020)	Area km^{2}
Locarno	Locarno	Locarno	15,728	19.27
Muralto	Muralto	Muralto	2,604	0.60
Orselina	Orselina	Orselina	706	1.94
		Total	19,038	21.81

Circolo delle Isole
Flag	Coat of arms	Municipality	Population (31 December 2020)	Area km^{2}
Ascona	Ascona	Ascona	5,554	4.97
Brissago	Brissago	Brissago	1,685	17.79
Ronco sopra Ascona	Ronco sopra Ascona	Ronco sopra Ascona	550	5.02
Losone	Losone	Losone	6,647	9.53
		Total	14,436	37.31

Circolo di Onsernone
Flag	Coat of arms	Municipality	Population (31 December 2020)	Area km^{2}
Onsernone	Onsernone	Onsernone	663	29.86
		Total	663	29.86

Circolo del Gambarogno
Flag	Coat of arms	Municipality	Population (31 December 2020)	Area km^{2}
Gambarogno	Gambarogno	Gambarogno	5,163	51.8
		Total	5,163	51.8

Circolo della Melezza
Flag	Coat of arms	Municipality	Population (31 December 2020)	Area km^{2}
Centovalli	Centovalli	Centovalli	1,135	51.1
Terre di Pedemonte	Terre di Pedemonte	Terre di Pedemonte	2,627	11.59
		Total	3,701	62.47

Circolo della Verzasca
Flag	Coat of arms	Municipality	Population (31 December 2020)	Area km^{2}
Lavertezzo	Lavertezzo	Lavertezzo	1,245	58.11
Verzasca	Verzasca	Verzasca	799	c. 143
Cugnasco-Gerra	Cugnasco-Gerra	Cugnasco-Gerra	2,780	35.72
		Total	4,665	237.24

Circolo della Navegna
Flag	Coat of arms	Municipality	Population (31 December 2020)	Area km^{2}
Tenero-Contra	Tenero-Contra	Tenero-Contra	3,201	3.69
Minusio	Minusio	Minusio	7,356	5.85
Mergoscia	Mergoscia	Mergoscia	201	12.14
Brione sopra Minusio	Brione sopra Minusio	Brione sopra Minusio	480	3.84
Gordola	Gordola	Gordola	4,650	7.04
		Total	15,888	32.56

== Mergers and name changes ==
- On 25 October 2009 the municipalities of Borgnone, Intragna and Palagnedra merged into the municipality of Centovalli.
- Gambarogno was created on 25 April 2010 through the merger of the municipalities of Caviano, Contone, Gerra Gambarogno, Indemini, Magadino, Piazzogna, San Nazzaro, Sant'Abbondio and Vira Gambarogno.
- The municipalities of Cavigliano, Tegna and Verscio merged on 14 April 2013 into the new municipality of Terre di Pedemonte.
- The municipalities of Gresso, Isorno, Mosogno and Vergeletto merged on 10 April 2016 into the new municipality of Onsernone.
- The municipalities of Brione/Verzasca, Corippo, Frasco, Sonogno, and Vogorno merged into the new municipality of Verzasca on 18 October 2020. Additionally, some territory formerly in Lavertezzo and Cugnasco-Gerra municipalities transferred into Verzasca on this date.

== Villages ==
- Gordemo
