= Terre di Pedemonte =

- Municipality
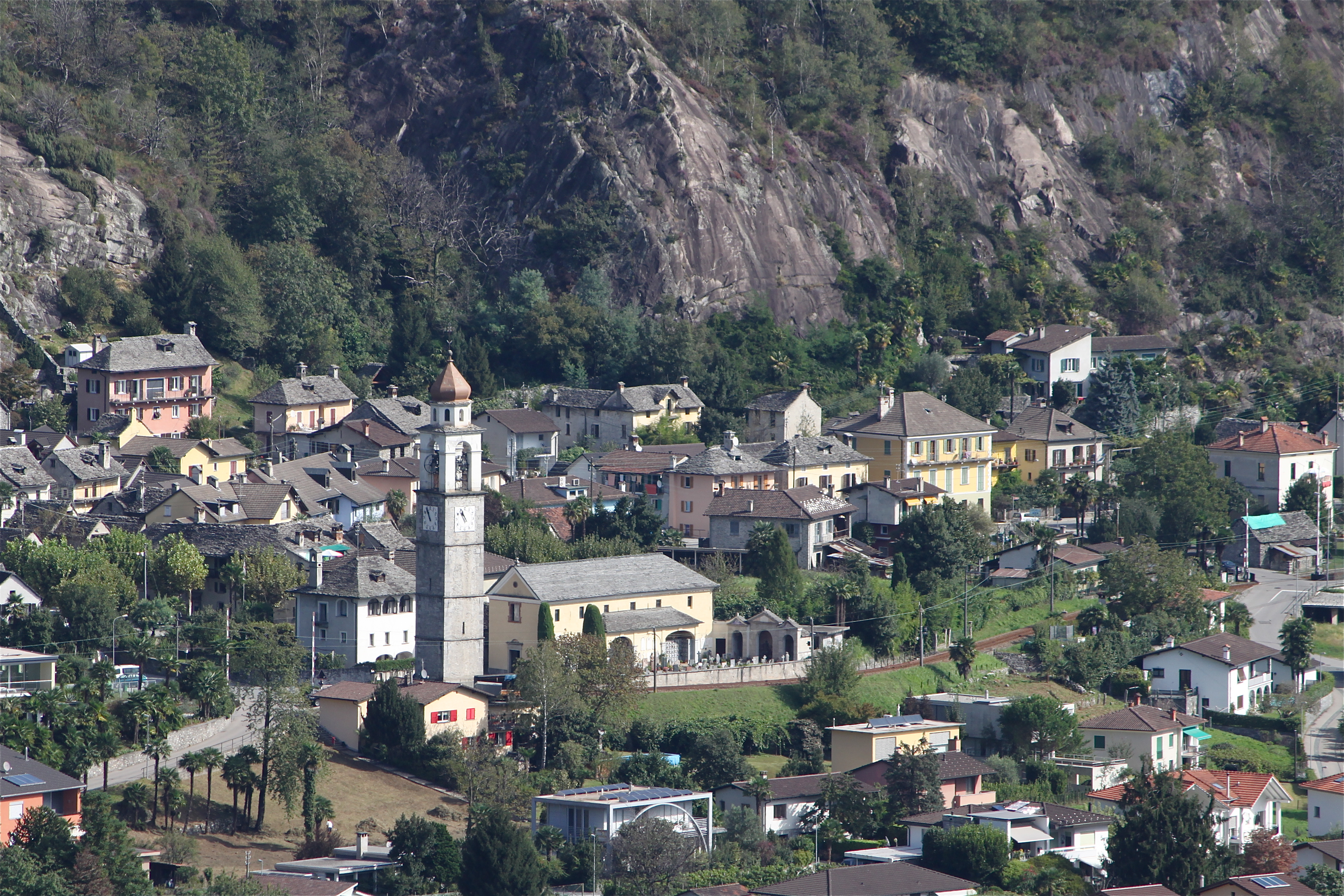
- Tegna village

- Flag Coat of arms
- Location of Terre di Pedemonte
- Location within Switzerland Location within Canton of Ticino
- Coordinates: 46°11′N 8°43′E
- Country: Switzerland
- Canton: Ticino
- District: Locarno

Government
  - Mayor: Sindaco

Area
  - Total: 11.37 km^{2} (4.39 sq mi)
- Elevation: 366 m (1,201 ft)

Population (Dec 2011)
  - Total: 2,537
  - Density: 223.1/km^{2} (577.9/sq mi)
- Time zone: UTC+01:00 (CET)
  - Summer (DST): UTC+02:00 (CEST)
- Postal code: 6652, 6653, 654
- SFOS number: 5396
- ISO 3166 code: CH-TI
- Surrounded by: Intragna, Isorno, Losone, Maggia
- Website: pedemonte.ch

Terre di Pedemonte is a municipality in the district of Locarno in the canton of Ticino in Switzerland. The municipalities of Cavigliano, Tegna and Verscio merged on 14 April 2013 into the new municipality of Terre di Pedemonte.

== History ==
=== Cavigliano ===
The earliest trace of a settlement in the area come from the Bronze Age. Other artifacts have been found from the Iron Age and Roman era tombs and coins from the 1st to 3rd century. The modern municipality of Cavigliano is first mentioned in 1213 as Caveliano. In 1591 it was mentioned as Caviano, Pedemonte di sopra and Terra di cima. During the Middle Ages the village was part of the Locarno and Ascona region, and it paid a tithe to the Capitanei of Locarno. During this time the villages of Cavigilano, Tegna, Verscio and Auressio formed the municipality of Pedemonte. Tegna left Pedemonte in 1464 to form an independent municipality. In the 16th century it became part of the bailiwick of Locarno. The village evolved into an independent political municipality in 1803.

The village Church of S. Michele dates from the 16th century, while the Catholic parish of Cavigliano was created in 1850.

The train station in the municipality on the Locarno–Domodossola line was built in 1923. Since the 1960s, the agrarian municipality gradually become a commuter town for the agglomeration of Locarno. The tourist and educational center of the Swiss Labor Assistance, known as Casa solidarietà, has been in the municipality since 1946.

=== Tegna ===
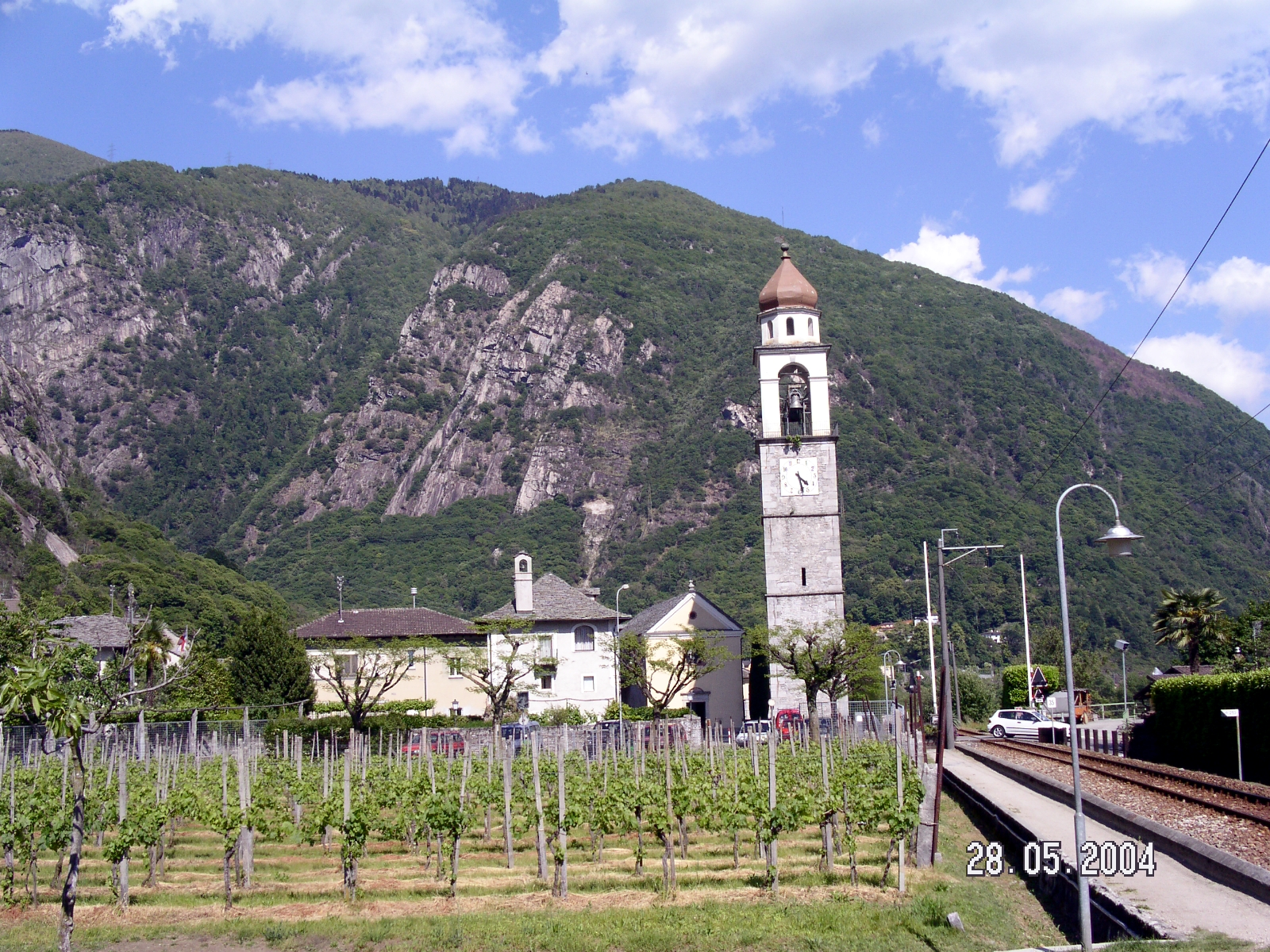
Village church of Tegna

Tegna was first mentioned in 1238 as Tenia. The oldest trace of a settlement in the area are several Bronze Age graves. The remains of a wall from a La Tène era fortification and a later Roman era building have also been discovered. During the Middle Ages, Tegna Castle and another smaller fortress were built in the mountains above the village. Both structures are now ruins.

The village church of S. Maria Assunta was first mentioned in the 14th century. At that time it was a filial church of the parish church in Verscio. S. Maria Assunta became the parish church for the Tegna parish in 1692/93.

During the Middle Ages the population grew crops and raised cattle in the valley around the village. Beginning in the 16th century they began a seasonal migration for work in the Livorno area. In the beginning of the 20th century, many residents migrated to jobs building the Locarno-Domodossola railroad line and nearby hydroelectric power plants. Much of the village was destroyed in a massive flood in 1978.

=== Verscio ===
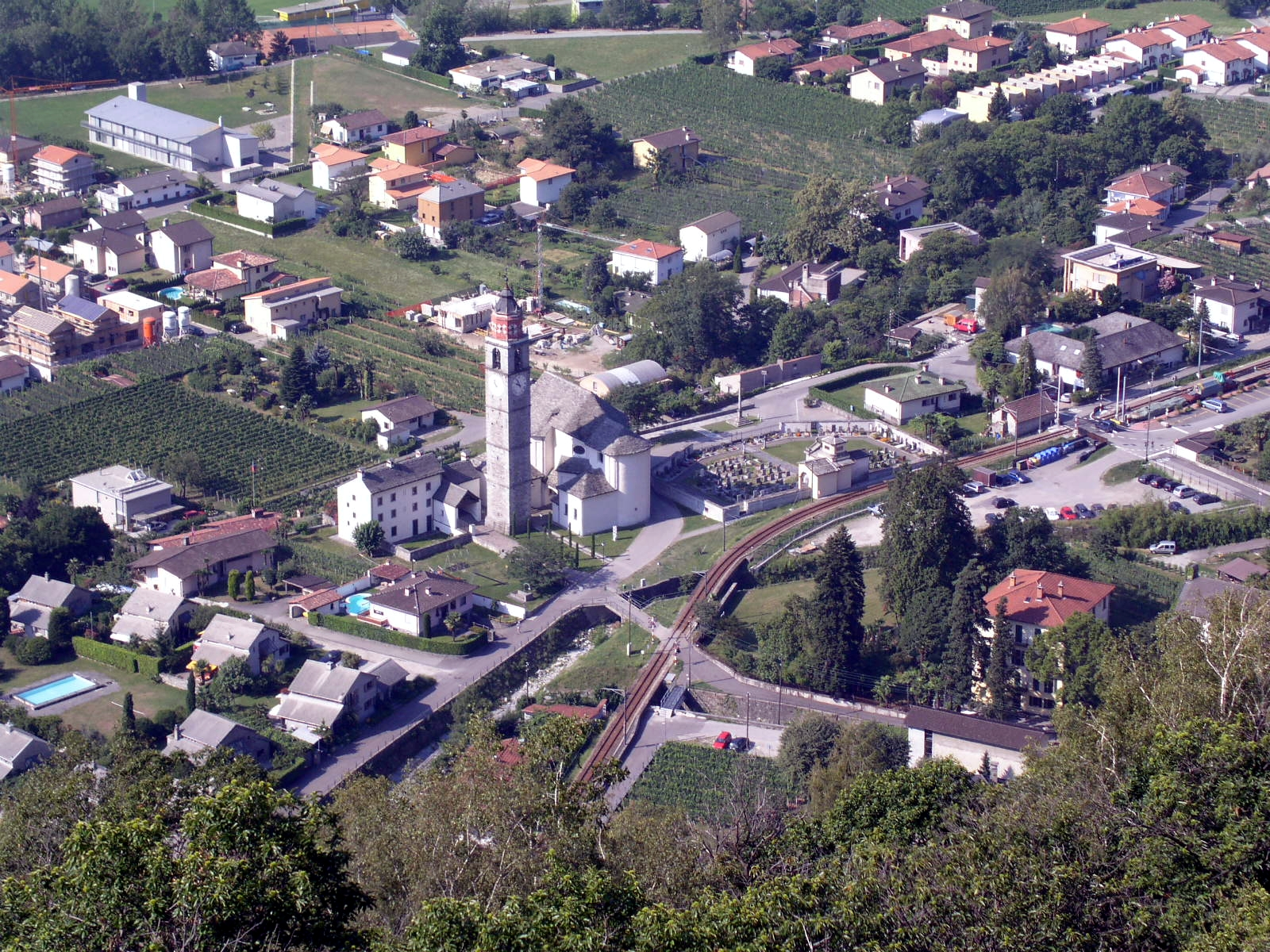
Aerial view of Verscio village

Verscio was first mentioned in 1335 as Varzio. In 1366 it was mentioned as Vercio. Throughout its history, Verscio was the political and religious center of the Pedemonte community.

The village parish church of S. Fedele was consecrated in 1214 and served as the religious center of the surrounding villages until 1692/93 for Tenga and 1850 for Cavigliano. The early church was decorated with Romanesque and Gothic frescoes. The current church tower was built in 1707 and the rest of the church was renovated in 1743–48.

During the Middle Ages the population grew crops in the valley around the village. Beginning in the 16th century they began a seasonal migration for work in the Livorno area. The thin soil and limited farming land kept the village small and the population poor. In the 19th century many residents emigrated to other countries and the population dropped in Verscio. Beginning in the 1920s work in the watch industry provided about 60 jobs for residents. This remained an important part of the local economy until the 1970s when cheaper import watches damaged the Swiss watch industry. During the 1960s the city of Locarno began to expand and Verscio became a commuter town for the growing city. Today almost three-quarters of the working population commutes to jobs in Locarno.

In 1971 the Teatro Dimitri was founded in the village. The Teatro was the first permanent theater in the canton. Four years later it expanded into the Scuola Teatro Dimitri (Dimitri Theater School) and in 2004 it became a full secondary school.

== Historic population ==
The historical population is given in the following chart:

== Heritage sites of national significance ==
The Castelliere, a site with scattered prehistoric objects and Roman era buildings is listed on the Swiss Inventory of Cultural Property of National and Regional Significance. The entire village of Verscio is designated as part of the Inventory of Swiss Heritage Sites
