= Tegna, Switzerland =

Tegna
- Former municipality
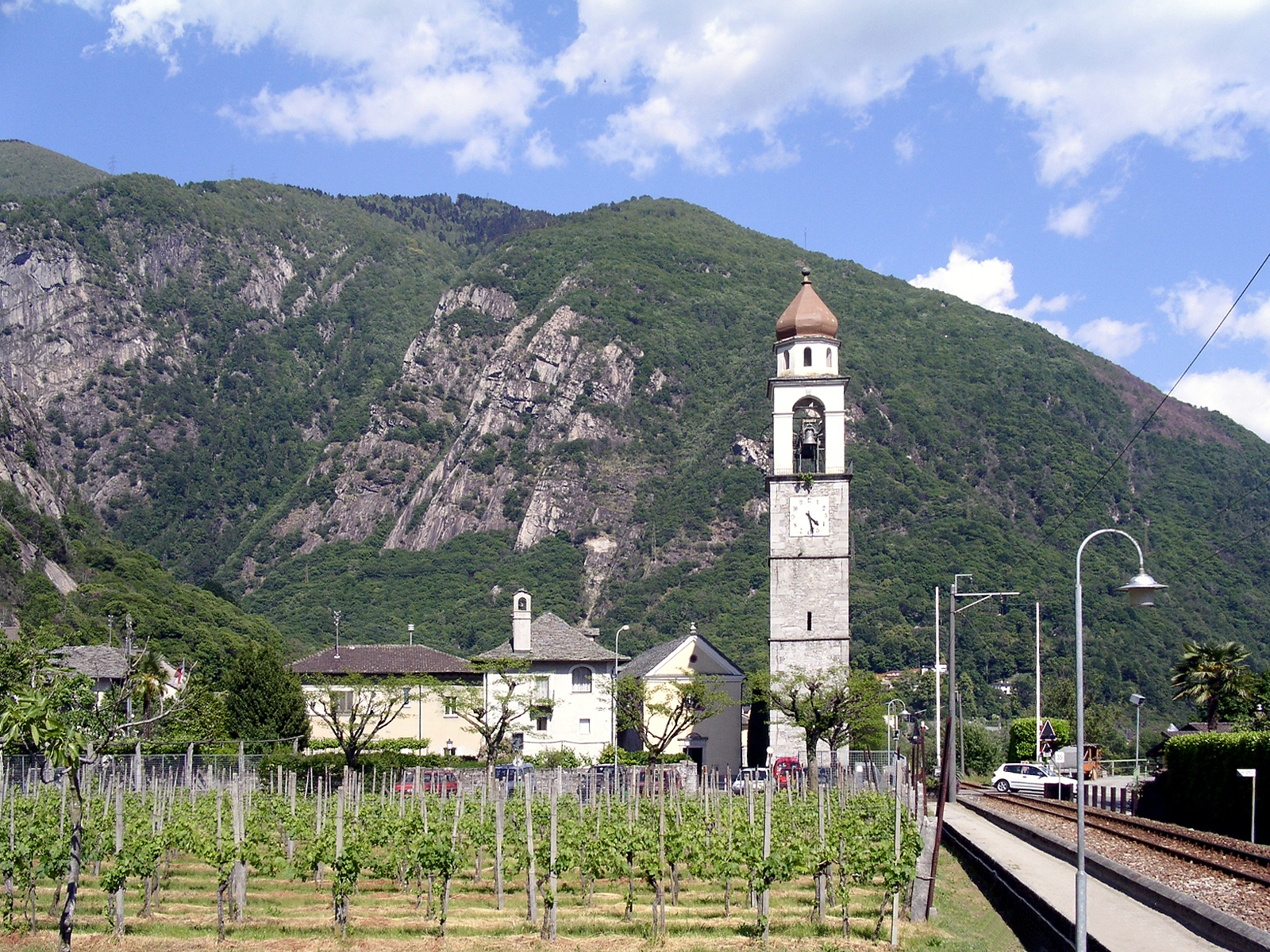
- Tegna village and church

- Flag Coat of arms
- Location of Tegna
- Location within Switzerland Location within Canton of Ticino
- Coordinates: 46°11′N 8°45′E
- Country: Switzerland
- Canton: Ticino
- District: Locarno

Area
  - Total: 2.89 km^{2} (1.12 sq mi)
- Elevation: 255 m (837 ft)

Population (Dec 2011)
  - Total: 749
  - Density: 259/km^{2} (671/sq mi)
- Time zone: UTC+01:00 (CET)
  - Summer (DST): UTC+02:00 (CEST)
- Postal code: 6652
- SFOS number: 5130
- ISO 3166 code: CH-TI
- Surrounded by: Avegno, Locarno, Losone, Verscio
- Website: SFSO statistics

Tegna is a former municipality in the district of Locarno in the canton of Ticino in Switzerland. The municipalities of Cavigliano, Tegna and Verscio merged on 14 April 2013 into the new municipality of Terre di Pedemonte.

== Geography ==
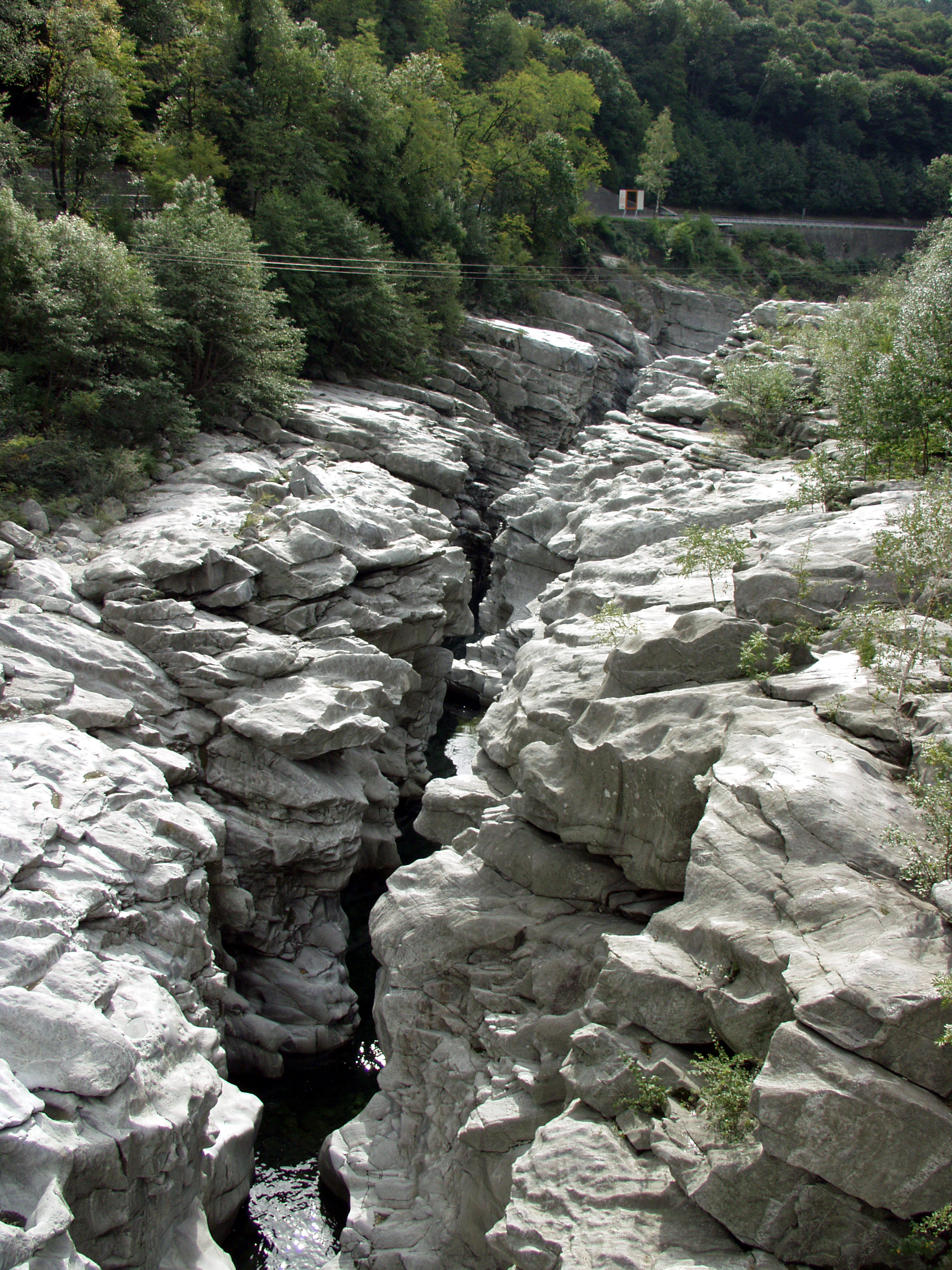
Ponte Brolla gorge on the Maggia river, near Tegna

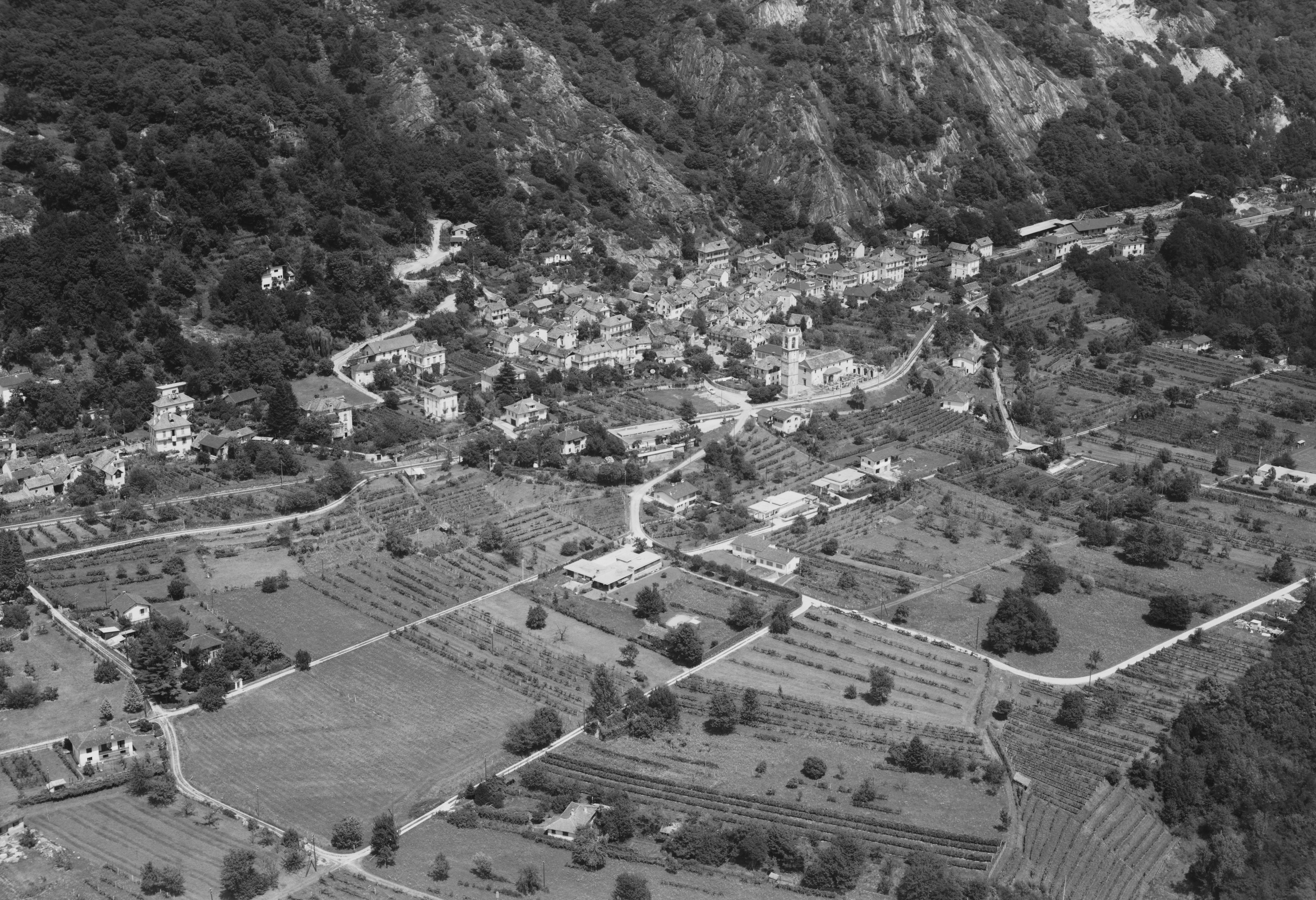
Aerial view (1964)

Before the merger, Tegna had a total area of 2.9 km^{2} (1.1 mi^{2}). Of this area, 0.34 km^{2} (0.13 sq mi) or 11.8% is used for agricultural purposes, while 1.72 km^{2} (0.66 sq mi) or 59.5% is forested. Of the rest of the land, 0.47 km^{2} (0.18 sq mi) or 16.3% is settled (buildings or roads), 0.14 km^{2} (35 acres) or 4.8% is either rivers or lakes and 0.51 km^{2} (0.20 sq mi) or 17.6% is unproductive land.

Of the built up area, housing and buildings made up 10.4% and transportation infrastructure made up 4.2%. Power and water infrastructure as well as other special developed areas made up 1.4% of the area. Out of the forested land, 55.4% of the total land area is heavily forested and 4.2% is covered with orchards or small clusters of trees. Of the agricultural land, 1.0% is used for growing crops and 10.4% is used for alpine pastures. All the water in the municipality is flowing water. Of the unproductive areas, 15.2% is unproductive vegetation and 2.4% is too rocky for vegetation.

== Coat of arms ==
The blazon of the municipal coat of arms is Argent a cross gules and in canton a bar azure embowed in base.

== Demographics ==
Tegna had a population (as of 2011) of 749. As of 2008, 13.6% of the population are resident foreign nationals. Over the last 10 years (1997–2007) the population has changed at a rate of 7.9%.

Most of the population (as of 2000) speaks Italian (77.6%), with German being second most common (15.7%) and French being third (2.9%). Of the Swiss national languages (as of 2000), 104 speak German, 19 people speak French, 513 people speak Italian, and 1 person speaks Romansh. The remainder (24 people) speak another language.

As of 2008, the gender distribution of the population was 48.6% male and 51.4% female. The population was made up of 295 Swiss men (39.7% of the population), and 66 (8.9%) non-Swiss men. There were 350 Swiss women (47.1%), and 32 (4.3%) non-Swiss women.

In 2008 there were 5 live births to Swiss citizens and were 8 deaths of Swiss citizens and 1 non-Swiss citizen death. Ignoring immigration and emigration, the population of Swiss citizens decreased by 3 while the foreign population decreased by 1. There were 3 Swiss men and 1 Swiss woman who immigrated back to Switzerland. At the same time, there was 1 non-Swiss woman who immigrated from another country to Switzerland. The total Swiss population change in 2008 (from all sources, including moves across municipal borders) was a decrease of 11 and the non-Swiss population change was a decrease of 0 people. This represents a population growth rate of -1.5%.

The age distribution, as of 2009, in Tegna is; 68 children or 9.2% of the population are between 0 and 9 years old and 81 teenagers or 10.9% are between 10 and 19. Of the adult population, 71 people or 9.6% of the population are between 20 and 29 years old. 92 people or 12.4% are between 30 and 39, 139 people or 18.7% are between 40 and 49, and 105 people or 14.1% are between 50 and 59. The senior population distribution is 100 people or 13.5% of the population are between 60 and 69 years old, 56 people or 7.5% are between 70 and 79, there are 31 people or 4.2% who are over 80.

As of 2000, there were 274 private households in the municipality, and an average of 2.4 persons per household. In 2000 there were 209 single family homes (or 77.4% of the total) out of a total of 270 inhabited buildings. There were 34 two family buildings (12.6%) and 18 multi-family buildings (6.7%). There were also 9 buildings in the municipality that were multipurpose buildings (used for both housing and commercial or another purpose).

The vacancy rate for the municipality, in 2008, was 0%. In 2000 there were 348 apartments in the municipality. The most common apartment size was the 4 room apartment of which there were 108. There were 18 single room apartments and 106 apartments with five or more rooms. Of these apartments, a total of 272 apartments (78.2% of the total) were permanently occupied, while 73 apartments (21.0%) were seasonally occupied and 3 apartments (0.9%) were empty. As of 2007, the construction rate of new housing units was 17.3 new units per 1000 residents.

The historical population is given in the following table:

year	population
1850	240
1900	225
1950	393
1970	412
1990	616
2000	661

== Heritage sites of national significance ==
The Castelliere, a site with scattered prehistoric objects and Roman era buildings is listed as a Swiss heritage site of national significance.

== Politics ==
In the 2007 federal election the most popular party was the FDP which received 35.31% of the vote. The next three most popular parties were the CVP (18.36%), the SP (17.43%) and the Ticino League (11.99%). In the federal election, a total of 299 votes were cast, and the voter turnout was 56.2%.

In the 2007 Gran Consiglio election, there were a total of 524 registered voters in Tegna, of which 322 or 61.5% voted. 4 blank ballots were cast, leaving 318 valid ballots in the election. The most popular party was the PLRT which received 82 or 25.8% of the vote. The next three most popular parties were; the PPD+GenGiova (with 58 or 18.2%), the PS (with 56 or 17.6%) and the SSI (with 53 or 16.7%).

In the 2007 Consiglio di Stato election, 2 blank ballots were cast, leaving 320 valid ballots in the election. The most popular party was the PLRT which received 78 or 24.4% of the vote. The next three most popular parties were; the PS (with 72 or 22.5%), the LEGA (with 59 or 18.4%) and the PPD (with 57 or 17.8%).

== Economy ==
As of 2007, Tegna had an unemployment rate of 3.49%. As of 2005, there were 22 people employed in the primary economic sector and about 3 businesses involved in this sector. 49 people were employed in the secondary sector and there were 9 businesses in this sector. 85 people were employed in the tertiary sector, with 22 businesses in this sector. There were 299 residents of the municipality who were employed in some capacity, of which females made up 38.1% of the workforce.

In 2000, there were 196 workers who commuted into the municipality and 214 workers who commuted away. The municipality is a net exporter of workers, with about 1.1 workers leaving the municipality for every one entering. About 21.4% of the workforce coming into Tegna are coming from outside Switzerland. Of the working population, 5.4% used public transportation to get to work, and 62.5% used a private car.

As of 2009, there were 5 hotels in Tegna with a total of 40 rooms and 81 beds.

== Religion ==
From the 2000 census, 461 or 69.7% were Roman Catholic, while 84 or 12.7% belonged to the Swiss Reformed Church. There are 82 individuals (or about 12.41% of the population) who belong to another church (not listed on the census), and 34 individuals (or about 5.14% of the population) did not answer the question.

== Education ==
In Tegna about 81.5% of the population (between age 25–64) have completed either non-mandatory upper secondary education or additional higher education (either university or a Fachhochschule).

In Tegna there were a total of 137 students (as of 2009). The Ticino education system provides up to three years of non-mandatory kindergarten and in Tegna there were 21 children in kindergarten. The primary school program lasts for five years and includes both a standard school and a special school. In the village, 41 students attended the standard primary schools and 3 students attended the special school. In the lower secondary school system, students either attend a two-year middle school followed by a two-year pre-apprenticeship or they attend a four-year program to prepare for higher education. There were 41 students in the two-year middle school, while 8 students were in the four-year advanced program.

The upper secondary school includes several options, but at the end of the upper secondary program, a student will be prepared to enter a trade or to continue on to a university or college. In Ticino, vocational students may either attend school while working on their internship or apprenticeship (which takes three or four years) or may attend school followed by an internship or apprenticeship (which takes one year as a full-time student or one and a half to two years as a part-time student). There were 5 vocational students who were attending school full-time and 17 who attend part-time.

The professional program lasts three years and prepares a student for a job in engineering, nursing, computer science, business, tourism and similar fields. There was 1 student in the professional program.

As of 2000, there were 5 students in Tegna who came from another municipality, while 77 residents attended schools outside the municipality.
