= Cavigliano =

- Former municipality
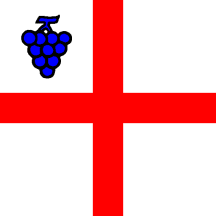
- Flag Coat of arms
- Location of Cavigliano
- Location within Switzerland Location within Canton of Ticino
- Coordinates: 46°11′N 8°43′E
- Country: Switzerland
- Canton: Ticino
- District: Locarno

Area
  - Total: 5.48 km^{2} (2.12 sq mi)
- Elevation: 366 m (1,201 ft)

Population (Dec 2011)
  - Total: 697
  - Density: 127/km^{2} (329/sq mi)
- Time zone: UTC+01:00 (CET)
  - Summer (DST): UTC+02:00 (CEST)
- Postal code: 6654
- SFOS number: 5099
- ISO 3166 code: CH-TI
- Surrounded by: Intragna, Isorno, Losone, Maggia, Verscio
- Website: SFSO statistics

Cavigliano is a former municipality in the district of Locarno in the canton of Ticino in Switzerland. The municipalities of Cavigliano, Tegna and Verscio merged on 14 April 2013 into the new municipality of Terre di Pedemonte.

== History ==
Aerial view (1953)

The earliest trace of a settlement in the area come from the Bronze Age. Other artifacts have been found from the Iron Age and Roman era tombs and coins from the 1st to 3rd century. The modern municipality of Cavigliano is first mentioned in 1213 as Caveliano. In 1591 it was mentioned as Caviano, Pedemonte di sopra and Terra di cima. During the Middle Ages the village was part of the Locarno and Ascona region, and it paid a tithe to the Capitanei of Locarno. During this time the villages of Cavigilano, Tegna, Verscio and Auressio formed the municipality of Pedemonte. Tegna left Pedemonte in 1464 to form an independent municipality. In the 16th century it became part of the bailiwick of Locarno. The village evolved into an independent political municipality in 1803.

The village Church of S. Michele dates from the 16th century, while the Catholic parish of Cavigliano was created in 1850.

The train station in the municipality on the Locarno-Domodossola line was built in 1923. Since the 1960s, the agrarian municipality gradually become a commuter town for the agglomeration of Locarno. The tourist and educational center of the Swiss Labor Assistance, known as Casa solidarietà, has been in the municipality since 1946.

== Geography ==
Before the merger, Cavigliano had a total area of 5.5 km^{2} (2.1 mi^{2}). Of this area, 0.4 km^{2} (0.15 sq mi) or 7.3% is used for agricultural purposes, while 3.69 km^{2} (1.42 sq mi) or 67.3% is forested. Of the rest of the land, 0.32 km^{2} (0.12 sq mi) or 5.8% is settled (buildings or roads), 0.15 km^{2} (37 acres) or 2.7% is either rivers or lakes and 1.04 km^{2} (0.40 sq mi) or 19.0% is unproductive land.

Of the built up area, housing and buildings made up 3.5% and transportation infrastructure made up 1.6%. Out of the forested land, 60.2% of the total land area is heavily forested and 6.0% is covered with orchards or small clusters of trees. Of the agricultural land, 2.0% is used for growing crops, while 1.8% is used for orchards or vine crops and 3.5% is used for alpine pastures. All the water in the municipality is flowing water. Of the unproductive areas, 17.9% is unproductive vegetation and 1.1% is too rocky for vegetation.

The former municipality is located in the Locarno district, on the rail line through Centovalli to Italy. It is at the entrance to the Onsernone Valley. It consists of the villages of Cavigliano, Tegna and Verscio which together form the Region Terre di Pedemonte and a single Bürgergemeinde.

== Coat of arms ==
The blazon of the municipal coat of arms is Argent a cross gules and in canton a bunch of grapes slipped azure.

== Demographics ==
Cavigliano had a population (as of 2011) of 697. As of 2008, 7.3% of the population are resident foreign nationals. Over the last 10 years (1997–2007) the population has changed at a rate of 10.1%.

Most of the population (as of 2000) speaks Italian (78.2%), with German being second most common (17.8%) and French being third (1.5%). Of the Swiss national languages (as of 2000), 115 speak German, 10 people speak French, 505 people speak Italian. The remainder (16 people) speak another language.

As of 2008, the gender distribution of the population was 46.7% male and 53.3% female. The population was made up of 317 Swiss men (44.1% of the population), and 19 (2.6%) non-Swiss men. There were 354 Swiss women (49.2%), and 29 (4.0%) non-Swiss women.

In 2008 there were 6 live births to Swiss citizens and there were 6 deaths of Swiss citizens. There was 1 Swiss man who emigrated from Switzerland. At the same time, there were 5 non-Swiss men and 4 non-Swiss women who immigrated from another country to Switzerland. The total Swiss population change in 2008 (from all sources) was a decrease of 3 and the non-Swiss population change was an increase of 14 people. This represents a population growth rate of 1.5%.

The age distribution, as of 2009, in Cavigliano is; 72 children or 10.0% of the population are between 0 and 9 years old and 90 teenagers or 12.5% are between 10 and 19. Of the adult population, 62 people or 8.6% of the population are between 20 and 29 years old. 79 people or 11.0% are between 30 and 39, 136 people or 18.9% are between 40 and 49, and 86 people or 12.0% are between 50 and 59. The senior population distribution is 107 people or 14.9% of the population are between 60 and 69 years old, 44 people or 6.1% are between 70 and 79, there are 43 people or 6.0% who are over 80.

As of 2000, there were 269 private households in the municipality, and an average of 2.4 persons per household. In 2000 there were 233 single family homes (or 77.4% of the total) out of a total of 301 inhabited buildings. There were 49 two family buildings (16.3%) and 7 multi-family buildings (2.3%). There were also 12 buildings in the municipality that were multipurpose buildings (used for both housing and commercial or another purpose).

The vacancy rate for the municipality, in 2008, was 0%. In 2000 there were 385 apartments in the municipality. The most common apartment size was the 4 room apartment of which there were 124. There were 23 single room apartments and 100 apartments with five or more rooms. Of these apartments, a total of 266 apartments (69.1% of the total) were permanently occupied, while 117 apartments (30.4%) were seasonally occupied and 2 apartments (0.5%) were empty. As of 2007, the construction rate of new housing units was 2.8 new units per 1000 residents.

The historical population is given in the following table:

year	population
1591	300
1850	258
1900	225
1950	312
1990	515
2000	646

== Politics ==
In the 2007 federal election the most popular party was the FDP which received 29.98% of the vote. The next three most popular parties were the CVP (25.89%), the SP (24%) and the Green Party (7.6%). In the federal election, a total of 293 votes were cast, and the voter turnout was 56.0%.

In the 2007 Gran Consiglio election, there were a total of 529 registered voters in Cavigliano, of which 341 or 64.5% voted. 2 blank ballots were cast, leaving 339 valid ballots in the election. The most popular party was the PS which received 80 or 23.6% of the vote. The next three most popular parties were; the PLRT (with 78 or 23.0%), the PPD+GenGiova (with 74 or 21.8%) and the SSI (with 42 or 12.4%).

In the 2007 Consiglio di Stato election, The most popular party was the PS which received 93 or 27.2% of the vote. The next three most popular parties were; the PPD (with 83 or 24.3%), the PLRT (with 76 or 22.2%) and the SSI (with 40 or 11.7%).

== Economy ==
As of 2007, Cavigliano had an unemployment rate of 2.29%. As of 2005, there were 5 people employed in the primary economic sector and about 2 businesses involved in this sector. 36 people were employed in the secondary sector and there were 9 businesses in this sector. 49 people were employed in the tertiary sector, with 16 businesses in this sector. There were 287 residents of the municipality who were employed in some capacity, of which females made up 42.2% of the workforce.

In 2000, there were 50 workers who commuted into the municipality and 214 workers who commuted away. The municipality is a net exporter of workers, with about 4.3 workers leaving the municipality for every one entering. About 26.0% of the workforce coming into Cavigliano are coming from outside Switzerland. Of the working population, 9.8% used public transportation to get to work, and 65.9% used a private car.

As of 2009, there were 3 hotels in Cavigliano with a total of 35 rooms and 66 beds.

== Religion ==
From the 2000 census, 427 or 66.1% were Roman Catholic, while 86 or 13.3% belonged to the Swiss Reformed Church. There are 111 individuals (or about 17.18% of the population) who belong to another church (not listed on the census), and 22 individuals (or about 3.41% of the population) did not answer the question.

== Education ==
The entire Swiss population is generally well educated. In Cavigliano about 82.6% of the population (between age 25 and 64) have completed either non-mandatory upper secondary education or additional higher education (either University or a Fachhochschule).

In Cavigliano there were a total of 140 students (as of 2009). The Ticino education system provides up to three years of non-mandatory kindergarten and in Cavigliano there were 13 children in kindergarten. The primary school program lasts for five years and includes both a standard school and a special school. In the municipality, 43 students attended the standard primary schools. In the lower secondary school system, students either attend a two-year middle school followed by a two-year pre-apprenticeship or they attend a four-year program to prepare for higher education. There were 44 students in the two-year middle school, while 19 students were in the four-year advanced program.

The upper secondary school includes several options, but at the end of the upper secondary program, a student will be prepared to enter a trade or to continue on to a university or college. In Ticino, vocational students may either attend school while working on their internship or apprenticeship (which takes three or four years) or may attend school followed by an internship or apprenticeship (which takes one year as a full-time student or one and a half to two years as a part-time student). There were 8 vocational students who were attending school full-time and 12 who attend part-time.

The professional program lasts three years and prepares a student for a job in engineering, nursing, computer science, business, tourism and similar fields. There was 1 student in the professional program.

As of 2000, there was 1 student in Cavigliano who came from another municipality, while 122 residents attended schools outside the municipality.
