= Losone =

- Municipality
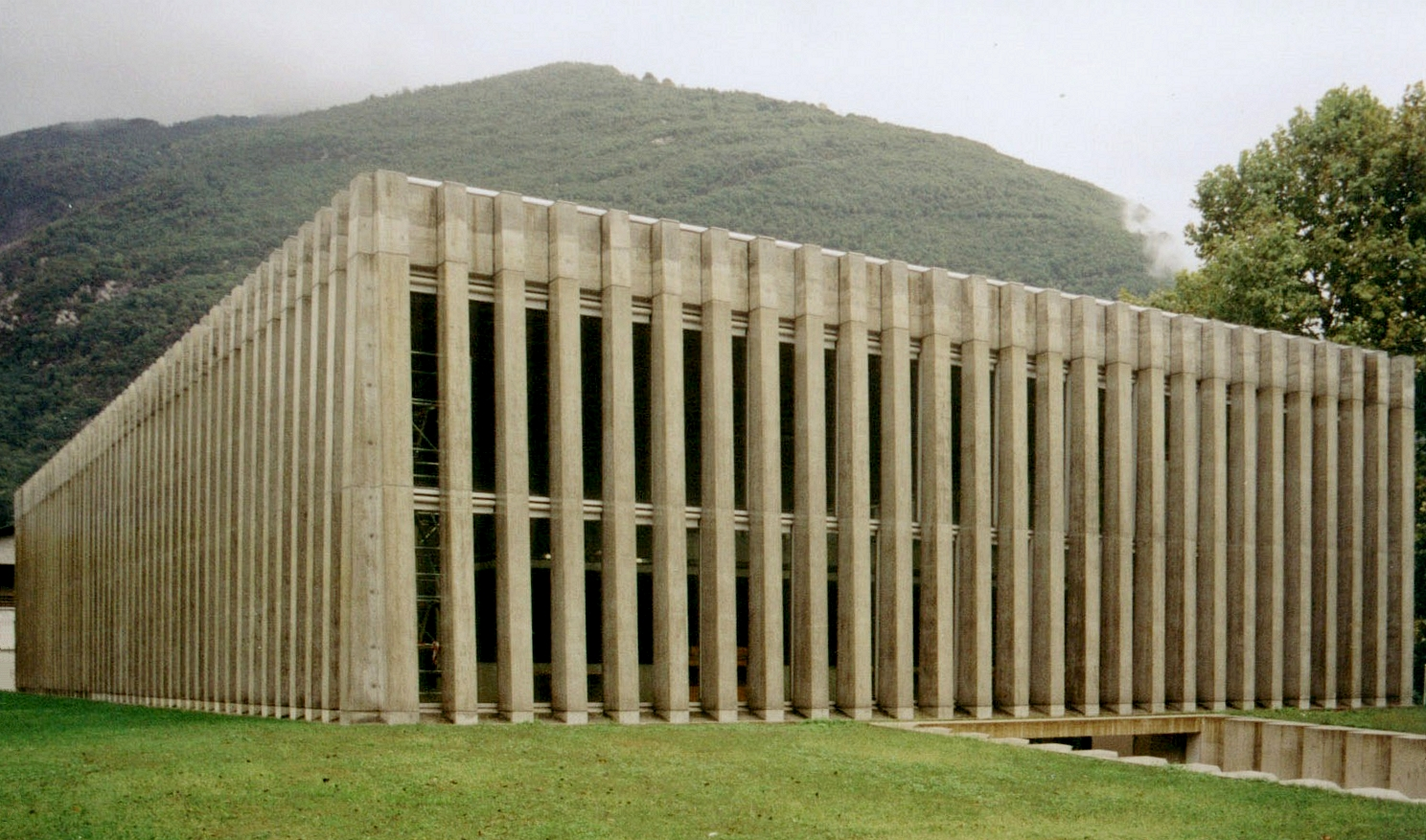
- Palestra Vacchini in Losone

- Flag Coat of arms
- Location of Losone
- Location within Switzerland Location within Canton of Ticino
- Coordinates: 46°10′N 8°46′E
- Country: Switzerland
- Canton: Ticino
- District: Locarno

Government
  - Mayor: Sindaco

Area
  - Total: 9.53 km^{2} (3.68 sq mi)
- Elevation: 238 m (781 ft)

Population (December 2004)
  - Total: 6,329
  - Density: 664/km^{2} (1,720/sq mi)
- Time zone: UTC+01:00 (CET)
  - Summer (DST): UTC+02:00 (CEST)
- Postal code: 6616
- SFOS number: 5115
- ISO 3166 code: CH-TI
- Surrounded by: Ascona, Cavigliano, Intragna, Locarno, Tegna, Verscio
- Website: losone.ch

Losone is a municipality in the district of Locarno in the canton of Ticino in Switzerland.

== History ==
The peat bogs of Arcegno, the rock shelters of Quarigo and the rock carvings in soapstone and gneiss appear to confirm that Losone has been inhabited since the Neolithic period. In 1934 and again in 1970–73 grave goods from the 1st to 4th centuries were found. There are also traces of a further use of the grave yard in the 6th century as well. The modern municipality of Losone is first mentioned in 1061 as Loxono though this is from a 1402 copy of the original. In 1200 it was mentioned as de losono. During the Middle Ages the settlement or borgo included the so-called Bassa Losone, Arcegno and until 1807, Vosa im Onsernonetal. It formed a Vicinanza in the parish of Locarno and had its own statutes and laws. The status of an independent Vicinanza was confirmed in 1734. Losone owned rights to alpine pastures in the valleys of Bosco/Gurin, Onsernone and Vigezzo. The people paid to the nobles of Locarno a tithe on vineyards and grain. In 1799, Losone opposed the Helvetic authorities who wanted to create a political municipality. Even after it became a political municipality in 1803, the Vicinanza played an important political and economic role.

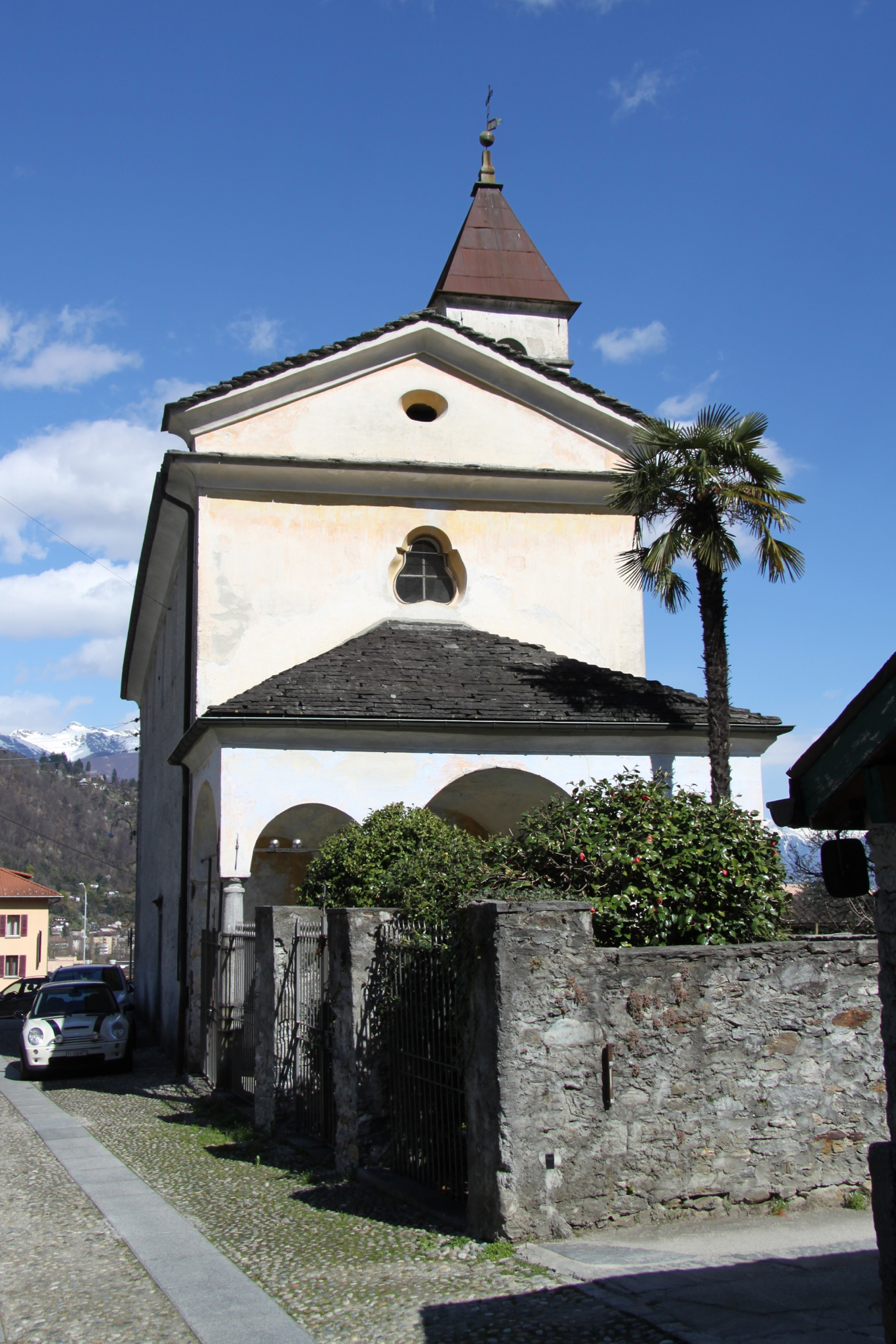
S. Rocco Church

The parish church of S. Lorenzo is first mentioned in 1243, though it is older than that. It separated, some time before 1580, from the mother church of San Vittore in Muralto to form a parish. In 1747 the church was granted a rector.

The local economy traditionally relied on agriculture and quarries. During the Ancien Régime many of residents emigrated for jobs. Grinders, pewter workers and customs officers moved from Losone to Tuscany and Rome, while stove fitters and chocolate manufacturers went to Austria and Hungary. The construction of the bridge over the Maggia in 1815, the road to Ascona and Golino in 1824–25 and Maggia river correction in 1890, allowed development in the village. Beginning in the 20th century the parish house and school were built. Between 1941 and 1947, Polish and Ukrainian soldiers were interned in the district of Arbigo. The soldiers helped build the road from Arcegno to Golino. In 1949–50 a warehouse was converted into a barracks (infantry until 1973, then paramedics). The machine factory Agie opened in Losono in 1957, which contributed to the emergence of a major industrial area in the region. After 1960, Losone developed more and more into a residential community. In 1976, the new education center was dedicated. In 1982, a nursing home opened. Between 1940 and 1980 Losone recorded the strongest population growth of all of the municipalities in the Sopraceneri. More recently, tourism has developed including a golf course, that opened in 1999 in Gerre.

== Geography ==
Aerial view (1953)

Losone has an area, as of 1997, of 9.53 square kilometers (3.68 sq mi). Of this area, 1.95 km^{2} (0.75 sq mi) or 20.5% is used for agricultural purposes, while 6.19 km^{2} (2.39 sq mi) or 65.0% is forested. Of the rest of the land, 1.91 km^{2} (0.74 sq mi) or 20.0% is settled (buildings or roads), 0.31 km^{2} (0.12 sq mi) or 3.3% is either rivers or lakes and 0.19 km^{2} (0.073 sq mi) or 2.0% is unproductive land.

Of the built up area, industrial buildings made up 2.0% of the total area while housing and buildings made up 11.8% and transportation infrastructure made up 4.0%. while parks, green belts and sports fields made up 1.8%. Out of the forested land, 61.1% of the total land area is heavily forested and 3.9% is covered with orchards or small clusters of trees. Of the agricultural land, 7.2% is used for growing crops, while 1.5% is used for orchards or vine crops and 11.8% is used for alpine pastures. All the water in the municipality is flowing water. Of the unproductive areas, 1.7% is unproductive vegetation.

The municipality is located in the Locarno district, on the right side of the Maggia river below the confluence of the Melezza river. It consists of the village of Losone and the hamlets of Saleggi and Gerre near the river, the hamlets of San Rocco, San Lorenzo and San Giorgio on the plateau and the hamlet of Arcegno in the mountains.

== Coat of arms ==
The blazon of the municipal coat of arms is Argent, a tower Azure charged with a lion of the first, langued Gules. The tower refers a 15th-century tower that was built in Losone.

== Demographics ==
Losone has a population (as of December 2020) of 6,647. As of 2008, 20.8% of the population are resident foreign nationals. Over the last 10 years (1997–2007) the population has changed at a rate of 9.5%.

Most of the population (as of 2000) speaks Italian (81.8%), with German being second most common (11.2%) and Serbo-Croatian being third (2.0%). Of the Swiss national languages (as of 2000), 664 speak German, 104 people speak French, 4,829 people speak Italian, and 3 people speak Romansh. The remainder (307 people) speak another language.

As of 2008, the gender distribution of the population was 49.1% male and 50.9% female. The population was made up of 2,424 Swiss men (37.6% of the population), and 747 (11.6%) non-Swiss men. There were 2,675 Swiss women (41.5%), and 606 (9.4%) non-Swiss women.

In 2008 there were 42 live births to Swiss citizens and 5 births to non-Swiss citizens, and in same time span there were 42 deaths of Swiss citizens and 8 non-Swiss citizen deaths. Ignoring immigration and emigration, the population of Swiss citizens remained the same while the foreign population decreased by 3. There was 1 Swiss man who emigrated from Switzerland. At the same time, there were 26 non-Swiss men and 27 non-Swiss women who immigrated from another country to Switzerland. The total Swiss population change in 2008 (from all sources, including moves across municipal borders) was an increase of 27 and the non-Swiss population change was a decrease of 11 people. This represents a population growth rate of 0.3%.

The age distribution, as of 2009, in Losone is; 560 children or 8.7% of the population are between 0 and 9 years old and 691 teenagers or 10.7% are between 10 and 19. Of the adult population, 652 people or 10.1% of the population are between 20 and 29 years old. 878 people or 13.6% are between 30 and 39, 1,172 people or 18.2% are between 40 and 49, and 827 people or 12.8% are between 50 and 59. The senior population distribution is 844 people or 13.1% of the population are between 60 and 69 years old, 562 people or 8.7% are between 70 and 79, there are 266 people or 4.1% who are over 80.

As of 2000, there were 2,545 private households in the municipality, and an average of 2.3 persons per household. In 2000 there were 1,043 single family homes (or 67.2% of the total) out of a total of 1,553 inhabited buildings. There were 224 two family buildings (14.4%) and 205 multi-family buildings (13.2%). There were also 81 buildings in the municipality that were multipurpose buildings (used for both housing and commercial or another purpose).

The vacancy rate for the municipality, in 2008, was 1.09%. In 2000 there were 3,069 apartments in the municipality. The most common apartment size was the 3 room apartment of which there were 944. There were 196 single room apartments and 512 apartments with five or more rooms. Of these apartments, a total of 2,540 apartments (82.8% of the total) were permanently occupied, while 412 apartments (13.4%) were seasonally occupied and 117 apartments (3.8%) were empty. As of 2007, the construction rate of new housing units was 3.8 new units per 1000 residents.

The historical population is given in the following table:

| year | population |
|---|---|
| 1850 | 642 |
| 1900 | 698 |
| 1950 | 1,437 |
| 1970 | 3,808 |
| 1980 | 4,911 |
| 2000 | 5,907 |

== Heritage sites of national significance ==
The Secondary School at via Primore 13 is listed as a Swiss heritage site of national significance.

== Politics ==
In the 2007 federal election the most popular party was the FDP which received 27.15% of the vote. The next three most popular parties were the SVP (19.53%), the CVP (18.68%) and the SP (16.1%). In the federal election, a total of 1,884 votes were cast, and the voter turnout was 45.8%.

In the 2007 Gran Consiglio election, there were a total of 4,080 registered voters in Losone, of which 2,415 or 59.2% voted. 50 blank ballots and 4 null ballots were cast, leaving 2,361 valid ballots in the election. The most popular party was the SSI which received 425 or 18.0% of the vote. The next three most popular parties were; the PLRT (with 423 or 17.9%), the PPD+GenGiova (with 371 or 15.7%) and the PS (with 350 or 14.8%).

In the 2007 Consiglio di Stato election, 25 blank ballots and 14 null ballots were cast, leaving 2,376 valid ballots in the election. The most popular party was the LEGA which received 493 or 20.7% of the vote. The next three most popular parties were; the PS (with 422 or 17.8%), the PPD (with 399 or 16.8%) and the PLRT (with 395 or 16.6%).

== Economy ==
As of 2007, Losone had an unemployment rate of 3.87%. As of 2005, there were 34 people employed in the primary economic sector and about 7 businesses involved in this sector. 1,780 people were employed in the secondary sector and there were 99 businesses in this sector. 1,149 people were employed in the tertiary sector, with 229 businesses in this sector. There were 2,959 residents of the municipality who were employed in some capacity, of which females made up 41.3% of the workforce.

In 2000, there were 3,615 workers who commuted into the municipality and 1,796 workers who commuted away. The municipality is a net importer of workers, with about 2.0 workers entering the municipality for every one leaving. About 27.5% of the workforce coming into Losone are coming from outside Switzerland. Of the working population, 8.4% used public transportation to get to work, and 61.3% used a private car.

As of 2009, there were 9 hotels in Losone with a total of 184 rooms and 354 beds.

== Religion ==
From the 2000 census, 4,500 or 76.2% were Roman Catholic, while 587 or 9.9% belonged to the Swiss Reformed Church. There are 566 individuals (or about 9.58% of the population) who belong to another church (not listed on the census), and 254 individuals (or about 4.30% of the population) did not answer the question.

== Education ==
The entire Swiss population is generally well educated. In Losone about 68.7% of the population (between age 25 and 64) have completed either non-mandatory upper secondary education or additional higher education (either university or a Fachhochschule).

In Losone there were a total of 1,090 students (as of 2009). The Ticino education system provides up to three years of non-mandatory kindergarten and in Losone there were 164 children in kindergarten. The primary school program lasts for five years and includes both a standard school and a special school. In the village, 317 students attended the standard primary schools and 10 students attended the special school. In the lower secondary school system, students either attend a two-year middle school followed by a two-year pre-apprenticeship or they attend a four-year program to prepare for higher education. There were 289 students in the two-year middle school and 7 in their pre-apprenticeship, while 107 students were in the four-year advanced program. The upper secondary school includes several options, but at the end of the upper secondary program, a student will be prepared to enter a trade or to continue on to a university or college. In Ticino, vocational students may either attend school while working on their internship or apprenticeship (which takes three or four years) or may attend school followed by an internship or apprenticeship (which takes one year as a full-time student or one and a half to two years as a part-time student). There were 55 vocational students who were attending school full-time and 125 who attend part-time.

The professional program lasts three years and prepares a student for a job in engineering, nursing, computer science, business, tourism and similar fields. There were 16 students in the professional program.

As of 2000, there were 299 students in Losone who came from another municipality, while 262 residents attended schools outside the municipality.

== Notable people ==
- Oliver Petrucciani (born 1969 in Losone) a Grand Prix motorcycle road racer
