= Gordola =

- Municipality
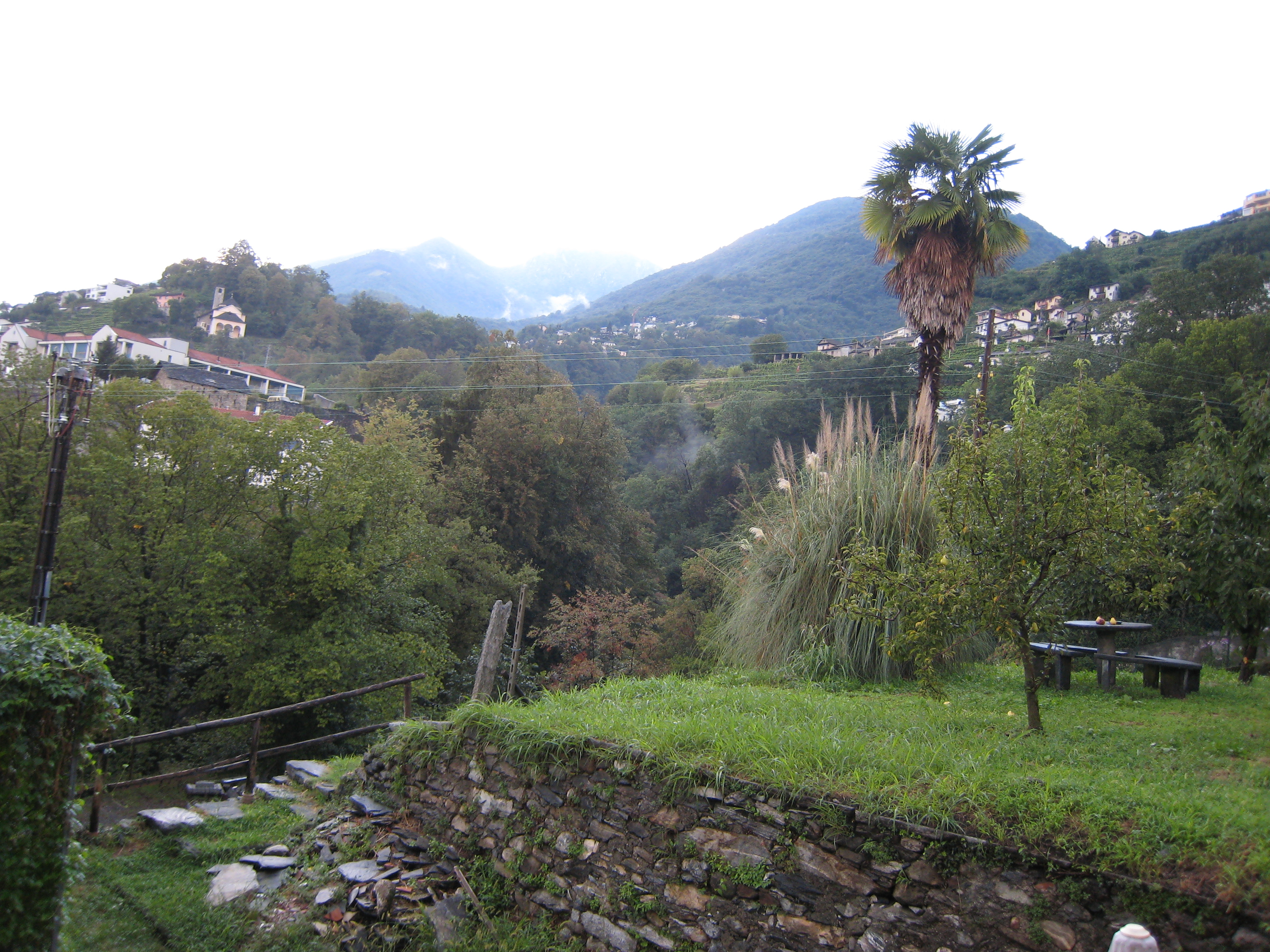
- Gordola village

- Flag Coat of arms
- Location of Gordola
- Location within Switzerland Location within Canton of Ticino
- Coordinates: 46°11′N 8°52′E
- Country: Switzerland
- Canton: Ticino
- District: Locarno

Government
  - Mayor: Sindaco

Area
  - Total: 7.04 km^{2} (2.72 sq mi)
- Elevation: 222 m (728 ft)

Population (December 2004)
  - Total: 4,149
  - Density: 589/km^{2} (1,530/sq mi)
- Time zone: UTC+01:00 (CET)
  - Summer (DST): UTC+02:00 (CEST)
- Postal code: 6596
- SFOS number: 5108
- ISO 3166 code: CH-TI
- Surrounded by: Cugnasco, Lavertezzo, Locarno, Mergoscia, Tenero-Contra, Vogorno
- Website: gordola.ch

Gordola (Italian pronunciation: [ˈɡordola]) is a municipality in the district of Locarno in the canton of Ticino in Switzerland.

== History ==
Gordola is first mentioned in 1200 as Gordora. In 1219, it was mentioned as Gordolla/e. Gordola was located near major roads throughout its history. During the Middle Ages, the village was on the hills as the valley floor was covered in swamps. In the 11th–12th centuries, a castle was built on the shore of Lake Maggiore for the feudal lord appointed by the Bishop of Como. The castle had disappeared by the 14th century. The Capitanei of Locarno owned land and were landlords in Gordola.

Within the territory of Locarno, Gordola was the only Vicinanza, which could choose its own pastor. It also held the right to designate a member of the parish council. Starting in the 14th century, many residents of the Verzasca valley traveled to Gordola to spend the winters at the lake. This gradually evolved into a traditional seasonal migration. Starting in 1695 Gordola was divided into two districts (squadre); those of the "original" and the "new" residents (Vicini). The two groups took turns administering the municipality.

The former parish church of SS Peter and Vincenzo was in Tenero and formed a kind of exclave, until 1898, when the provost was moved to the church of S. Antonio Abate. The church of S. Antonio Abate had existed since the 16th century, but was destroyed in 1829 by a flood and then was subsequently rebuilt. There was a mixed Humiliati order monastery (Santa Maria) in Gordola. It was founded in the 12th century and around the late 15th century closed.

Historically, nearly the entire population were farmers and ranchers. However, by 2000, only a very small proportion of the population worked in agriculture and about one third of the population worked in the municipal borders.

The district Motto-Rongia is a historic protected village center.

== Geography ==
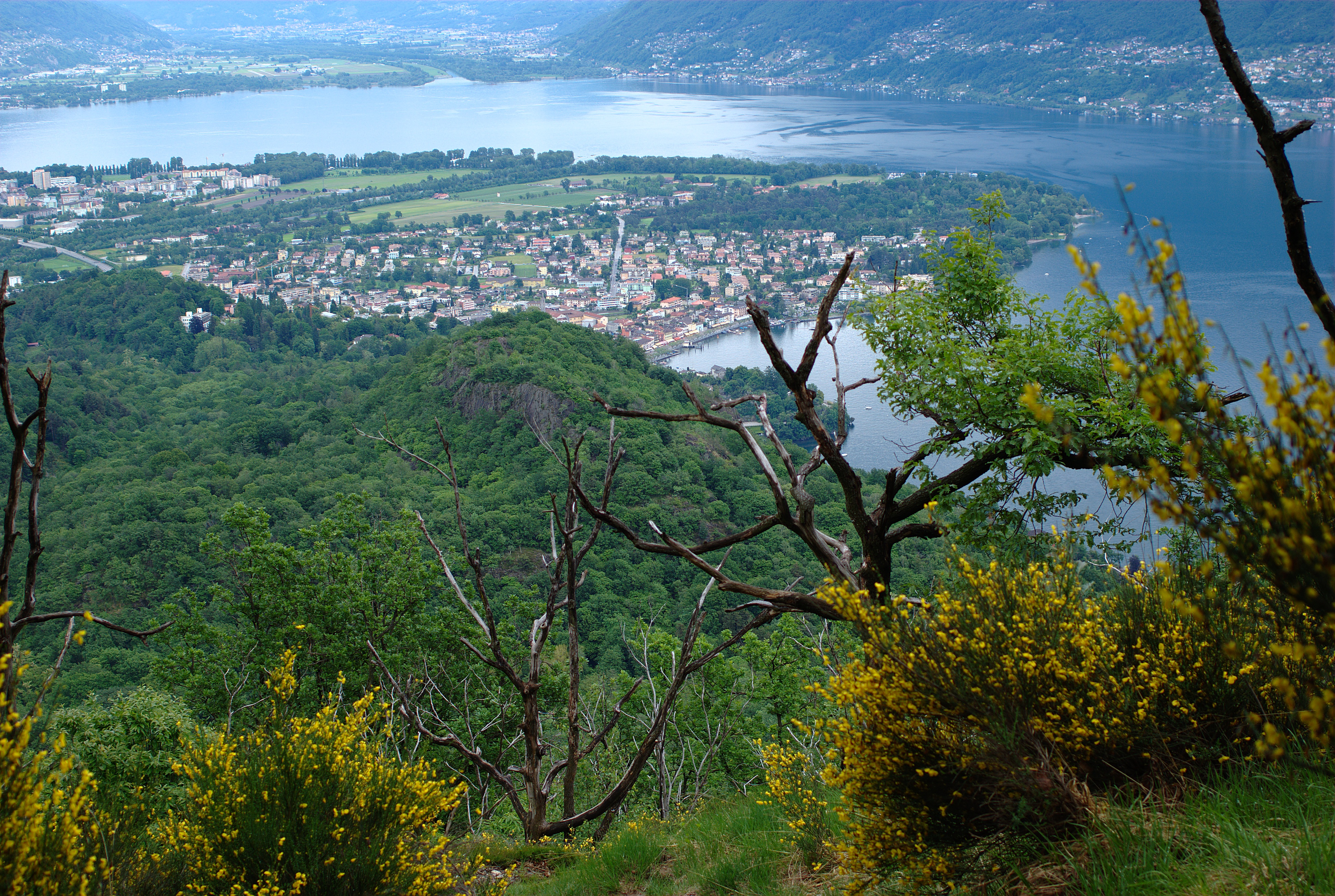
View of Lago Maggiore. Foreground (l-r) Locarno, Ascona. Background (l-r) Tenero-Contra, Gordola, Gambarogno

Aerial view from 1500 m by Walter Mittelholzer (1919)

Gordola has an area, as of 1997, of 7.04 square kilometers (2.72 sq mi). Of this area, 1.7 km^{2} (0.66 sq mi) or 24.1% is used for agricultural purposes, while 4.31 km^{2} (1.66 sq mi) or 61.2% is forested. Of the rest of the land, 1.17 km^{2} (0.45 sq mi) or 16.6% is settled (buildings or roads), 0.48 km^{2} (0.19 sq mi) or 6.8% is either rivers or lakes and 0.1 km^{2} (25 acres) or 1.4% is unproductive land.

Of the built up area, industrial buildings made up 1.6% of the total area while housing and buildings made up 11.1% and transportation infrastructure made up 3.3%. Out of the forested land, 59.8% of the total land area is heavily forested and 1.4% is covered with orchards or small clusters of trees. Of the agricultural land, 6.5% is used for growing crops, while 6.5% is used for orchards or vine crops and 11.1% is used for alpine pastures. Of the water in the municipality, 3.8% is in lakes and 3.0% is in rivers and streams. Of the unproductive areas, 1.1% is unproductive vegetation.

The municipality is located in the Locarno district at the end of the Verzasca valley on the left bank of the river. It consists of the village of Gordola and a portion of Terricciole.

== Coat of arms ==
The blazon of the municipal coat of arms is Per saltire gules and azure overall a salire or.

== Demographics ==
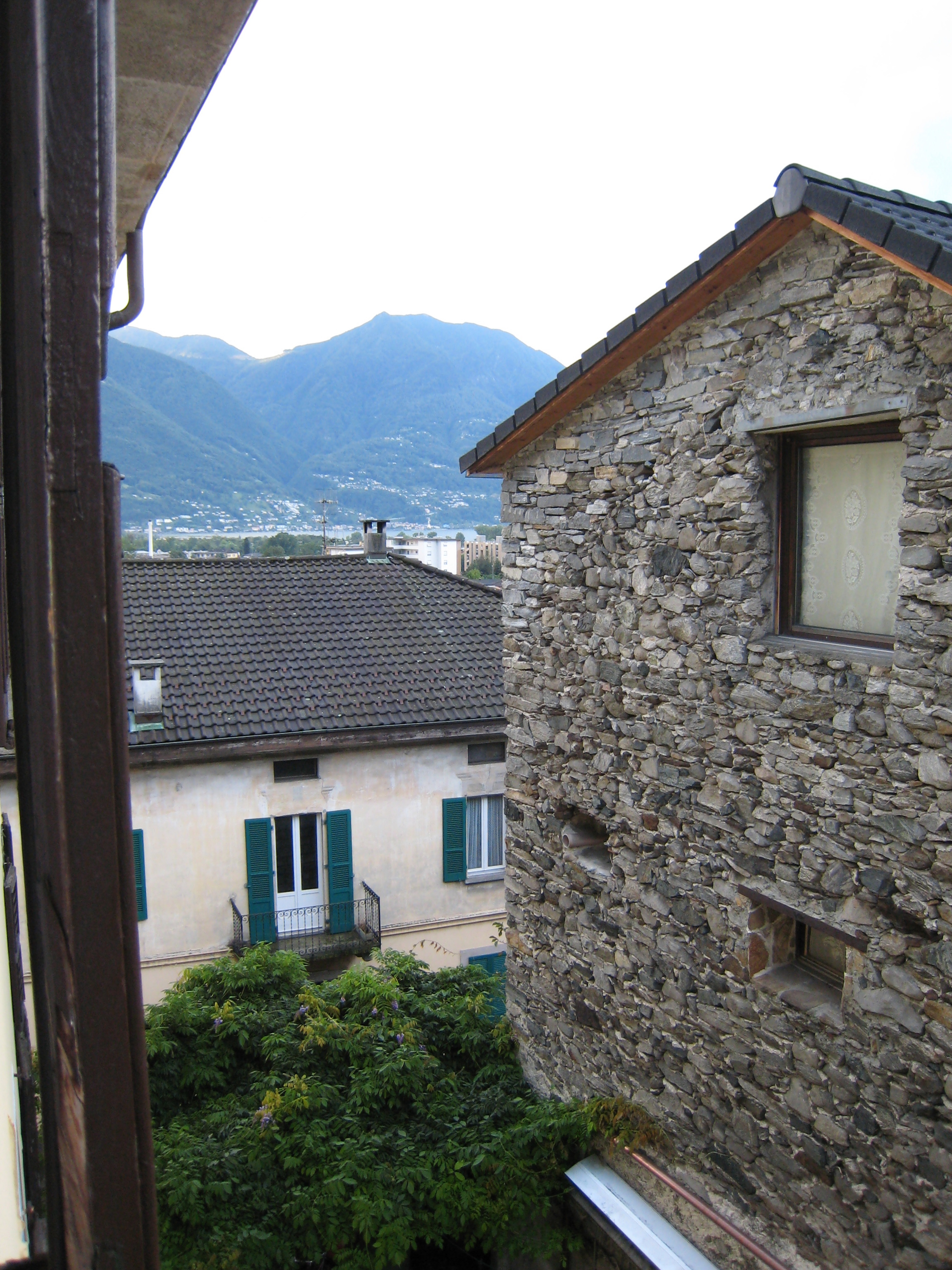
New and old houses in Gordola

Gordola has a population (as of December 2020) of 4,650. As of 2008, 17.0% of the population are resident foreign nationals. Over the last 10 years (1997–2007) the population has changed at a rate of 15.9%.

Most of the population (as of 2000) speaks Italian (84.2%), with German being second most common (10.2%) and Portuguese being third (1.2%). Of the Swiss national languages (as of 2000), 396 speak German, 47 people speak French, 3,265 people speak Italian, and 4 people speak Romansh. The remainder (166 people) speak another language.

As of 2008, the gender distribution of the population was 48.5% male and 51.5% female. The population was made up of 1,725 Swiss men (39.2% of the population), and 406 (9.2%) non-Swiss men. There were 1,935 Swiss women (44.0%), and 332 (7.5%) non-Swiss women.

In 2008 there were 29 live births to Swiss citizens and 2 births to non-Swiss citizens, and in same time span there were 25 deaths of Swiss citizens and 4 non-Swiss citizen deaths. Ignoring immigration and emigration, the population of Swiss citizens increased by 4 while the foreign population decreased by 2. There were 5 Swiss men and 3 Swiss women who immigrated back to Switzerland. At the same time, there were 11 non-Swiss men and 9 non-Swiss women who immigrated from another country to Switzerland. The total Swiss population change in 2008 (from all sources, including moves across municipal borders) was an increase of 49 and the non-Swiss population change was a decrease of 27 people. This represents a population growth rate of 0.5%.

The age distribution, as of 2009, in Gordola is; 417 children or 9.5% of the population are between 0 and 9 years old and 490 teenagers or 11.1% are between 10 and 19. Of the adult population, 468 people or 10.6% of the population are between 20 and 29 years old. 602 people or 13.7% are between 30 and 39, 723 people or 16.4% are between 40 and 49, and 543 people or 12.3% are between 50 and 59. The senior population distribution is 582 people or 13.2% of the population are between 60 and 69 years old, 381 people or 8.7% are between 70 and 79, there are 192 people or 4.4% who are over 80.

As of 2000, there were 1,652 private households in the municipality, and an average of 2.3 persons per household. In 2000 there were 889 single family homes (or 66.0% of the total) out of a total of 1,347 inhabited buildings. There were 254 two family buildings (18.9%) and 122 multi-family buildings (9.1%). There were also 82 buildings in the municipality that were multipurpose buildings (used for both housing and commercial or another purpose).

The vacancy rate for the municipality, in 2008, was 0.29%. In 2000 there were 2,110 apartments in the municipality. The most common apartment size was the 4 room apartment of which there were 788. There were 78 single room apartments and 433 apartments with five or more rooms. Of these apartments, a total of 1,646 apartments (78.0% of the total) were permanently occupied, while 439 apartments (20.8%) were seasonally occupied and 25 apartments (1.2%) were empty. As of 2007, the construction rate of new housing units was 7.8 new units per 1000 residents.

The historical population is given in the following table:

year	population
1596	150
1741	400
1850	290
1880	866
1900	550
1950	1,419
2000	3,878

== Politics ==
In the 2007 federal election the most popular party was the FDP which received 26.74% of the vote. The next three most popular parties were the CVP (25.47%), the SP (18.69%) and the SVP (12.63%). In the federal election, a total of 1,110 votes were cast, and the voter turnout was 39.3%.

In the 2007 Gran Consiglio election, there were a total of 2,790 registered voters in Gordola, of which 1,712 or 61.4% voted. 23 blank ballots and 2 null ballots were cast, leaving 1,687 valid ballots in the election. The most popular party was the PPD+GenGiova which received 359 or 21.3% of the vote. The next three most popular parties were; the SSI (with 337 or 20.0%), the PLRT (with 309 or 18.3%) and the PS (with 266 or 15.8%).

In the 2007 Consiglio di Stato election, 13 blank ballots and 2 null ballots were cast, leaving 1,698 valid ballots in the election. The most popular party was the LEGA which received 387 or 22.8% of the vote. The next three most popular parties were; the PPD (with 376 or 22.1%), the PS (with 299 or 17.6%) and the SSI (with 277 or 16.3%).

== Economy ==
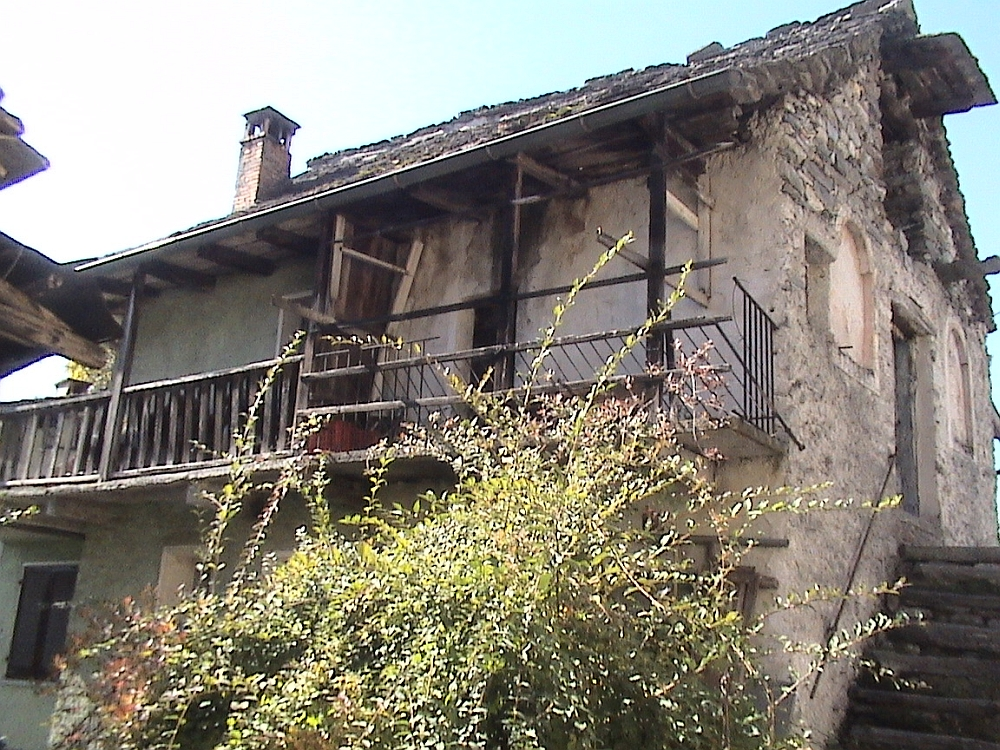
Rustico in Gordola

As of 2007, Gordola had an unemployment rate of 3.62%. As of 2005, there were 54 people employed in the primary economic sector and about 19 businesses involved in this sector. 431 people were employed in the secondary sector and there were 43 businesses in this sector. 644 people were employed in the tertiary sector, with 123 businesses in this sector. There were 1,743 residents of the municipality who were employed in some capacity, of which females made up 40.6% of the workforce.

In 2000, there were 1,024 workers who commuted into the municipality and 1,183 workers who commuted away. The municipality is a net exporter of workers, with about 1.2 workers leaving the municipality for every one entering. About 18.4% of the workforce coming into Gordola are coming from outside Switzerland. Of the working population, 6.8% used public transportation to get to work, and 67.2% used a private car.

As of 2009, there were 5 hotels in Gordola with a total of 43 rooms and 90 beds.

== Religion ==
From the 2000 census, 3,210 or 82.8% were Roman Catholic, while 297 or 7.7% belonged to the Swiss Reformed Church. There are 287 individuals (or about 7.40% of the population) who belong to another church (not listed on the census), and 84 individuals (or about 2.17% of the population) did not answer the question.

== Education ==
The entire Swiss population is generally well educated. In Gordola about 69.5% of the population (between age 25 and 64) have completed either non-mandatory upper secondary education or additional higher education (either university or a Fachhochschule).

In Gordola there were a total of 788 students (as of 2009). The Ticino education system provides up to three years of non-mandatory kindergarten and in Gordola there were 117 children in kindergarten. The primary school program lasts for five years and includes both a standard school and a special school. In the village, 224 students attended the standard primary schools and 9 students attended the special school. In the lower secondary school system, students either attend a two-year middle school followed by a two-year pre-apprenticeship or they attend a four-year program to prepare for higher education. There were 193 students in the two-year middle school and 6 in their pre-apprenticeship, while 80 students were in the four-year advanced program.

The upper secondary school includes several options, but at the end of the upper secondary program, a student will be prepared to enter a trade or to continue on to a university or college. In Ticino, vocational students may either attend school while working on their internship or apprenticeship (which takes three or four years) or may attend school followed by an internship or apprenticeship (which takes one year as a full-time student or one and a half to two years as a part-time student). There were 35 vocational students who were attending school full-time and 110 who attend part-time.

The professional program lasts three years and prepares a student for a job in engineering, nursing, computer science, business, tourism and similar fields. There were 14 students in the professional program.

As of 2000, there were 381 students in Gordola who came from another municipality, while 186 residents attended schools outside the municipality.

== Crime ==
In 2014 the crime rate, of the over 200 crimes listed in the Swiss Criminal Code (running from murder, robbery and assault to accepting bribes and election fraud), in Gordola was 37.1 per thousand residents. This rate is lower than average, at only 69.0% of the rate in the district, 67.7% of the cantonal rate and 57.4% of the average rate in the entire country. During the same period, the rate of drug crimes was 4.5 per thousand residents. This rate is also lower than average, at only 39.5% of the rate in the district, 51.1% of the rate in the canton and 45.5% of the national rate. The rate of violations of immigration, visa and work permit laws was 0 per thousand residents.
