= Verscio =

- Former municipality
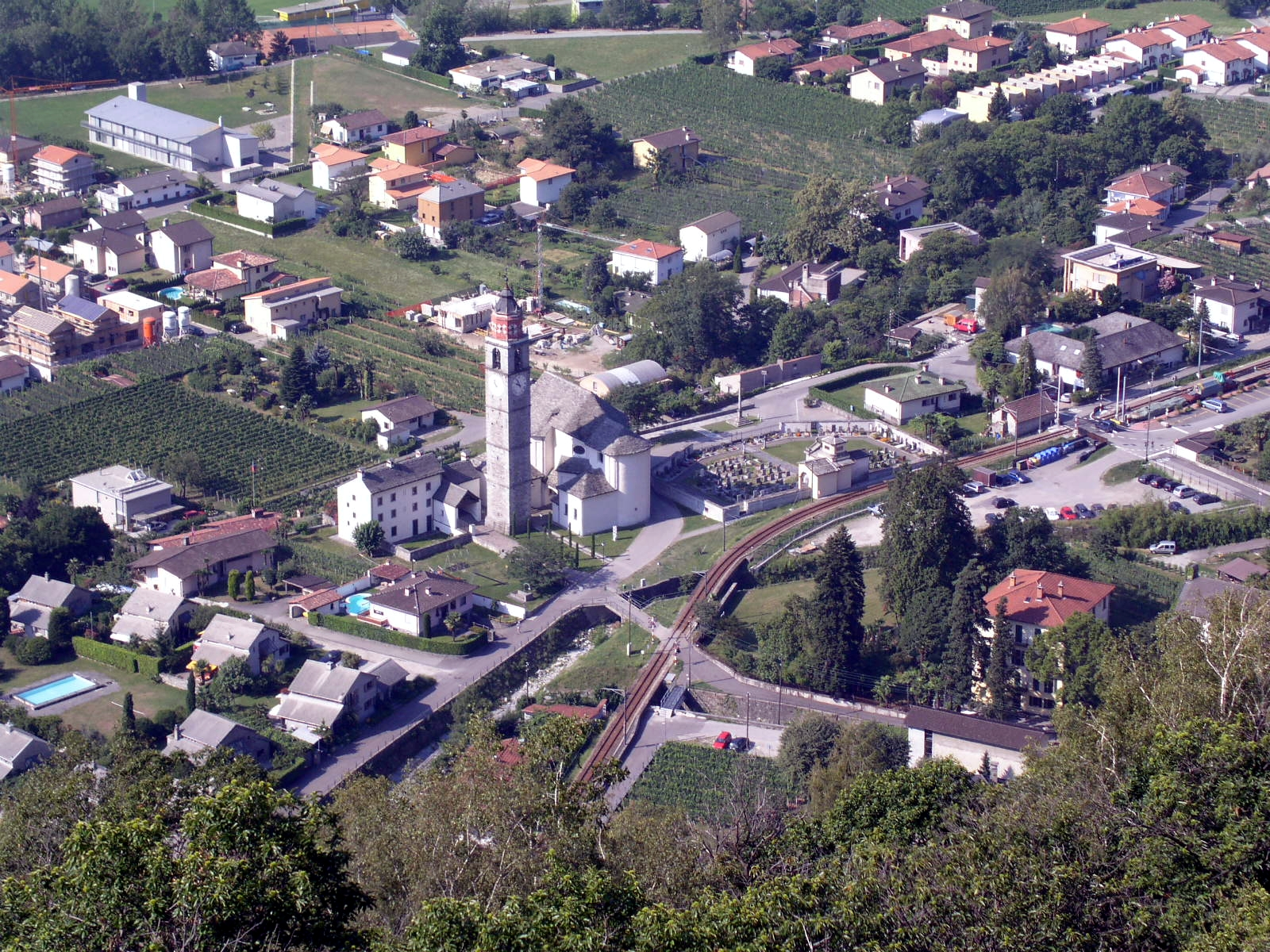
- Verscio village

- Flag Coat of arms
- Location of Verscio
- Location within Switzerland Location within Canton of Ticino
- Coordinates: 46°11′N 8°44′E
- Country: Switzerland
- Canton: Ticino
- District: Locarno

Area
  - Total: 3.0 km^{2} (1.2 sq mi)
- Elevation: 245 m (804 ft)

Population (Dec 2011)
  - Total: 1,091
  - Density: 360/km^{2} (940/sq mi)
- Time zone: UTC+01:00 (CET)
  - Summer (DST): UTC+02:00 (CEST)
- Postal code: 6653
- SFOS number: 5133
- ISO 3166 code: CH-TI
- Surrounded by: Avegno, Cavigliano, Losone, Maggia, Tegna
- Website: SFSO statistics

Verscio is a former municipality in the district of Locarno in the canton of Ticino in Switzerland. The municipalities of Cavigliano, Tegna and Verscio merged on 14 April 2013 into the new municipality of Terre di Pedemonte.

== Geography ==
Aerial view (1953)

Before the merger, Verscio had a total area of 3.1 km^{2} (1.2 mi^{2}). Of this area, 0.47 km^{2} (0.18 sq mi) or 15.7% is used for agricultural purposes, while 1.96 km^{2} (0.76 sq mi) or 65.3% is forested. Of the rest of the land, 0.33 km^{2} (0.13 sq mi) or 11.0% is settled (buildings or roads), 0.12 km^{2} (30 acres) or 4.0% is either rivers or lakes and 0.25 km^{2} (0.097 sq mi) or 8.3% is unproductive land.

Of the built up area, housing and buildings made up 7.3% and transportation infrastructure made up 1.3%. Power and water infrastructure as well as other special developed areas made up 1.3% of the area Out of the forested land, 58.7% of the total land area is heavily forested and 5.0% is covered with orchards or small clusters of trees. Of the agricultural land, 4.0% is used for growing crops, while 4.3% is used for orchards or vine crops and 7.3% is used for alpine pastures. All the water in the municipality is flowing water. Of the unproductive areas, 7.3% is unproductive vegetation.

== Demographics ==
Verscio had a population (as of 2011) of 1,091. As of 2008, 14.3% of the population are resident foreign nationals. Over the last 10 years (1997–2007) the population has changed at a rate of 25%.

Most of the population (as of 2000) speaks Italian (76.7%), with German being second most common (16.5%) and French being third (3.2%). Of the Swiss national languages (as of 2000), 146 speak German, 28 people speak French, 680 people speak Italian, and 6 people speak Romansh. The remainder (27 people) speak another language.

As of 2008, the gender distribution of the population was 48.9% male and 51.1% female. The population was made up of 453 Swiss men (40.7% of the population), and 92 (8.3%) non-Swiss men. There were 500 Swiss women (44.9%), and 69 (6.2%) non-Swiss women.

In 2008 there were 9 live births to Swiss citizens and 1 birth to non-Swiss citizens, and in same time span there were 5 deaths of Swiss citizens. Ignoring immigration and emigration, the population of Swiss citizens increased by 4 while the foreign population increased by 1. There was 1 Swiss man and 1 Swiss woman who immigrated back to Switzerland. At the same time, there was 1 non-Swiss man who immigrated from another country to Switzerland. The total Swiss population change in 2008 (from all sources, including moves across municipal borders) was an increase of 13 and the non-Swiss population change was an increase of 6 people. This represents a population growth rate of 1.7%.

The age distribution, as of 2009, in Verscio is; 130 children or 11.7% of the population are between 0 and 9 years old and 141 teenagers or 12.7% are between 10 and 19. Of the adult population, 99 people or 8.9% of the population are between 20 and 29 years old. 119 people or 10.7% are between 30 and 39, 209 people or 18.8% are between 40 and 49, and 145 people or 13.0% are between 50 and 59. The senior population distribution is 141 people or 12.7% of the population are between 60 and 69 years old, 86 people or 7.7% are between 70 and 79, there are 44 people or 3.9% who are over 80.

As of 2000, there were 375 private households in the municipality, and an average of 2.4 persons per household. In 2000 there were 238 single family homes (or 72.3% of the total) out of a total of 329 inhabited buildings. There were 43 two family buildings (13.1%) and 32 multi-family buildings (9.7%). There were also 16 buildings in the municipality that were multipurpose buildings (used for both housing and commercial or another purpose).

The vacancy rate for the municipality, in 2008, was 0%. In 2000 there were 470 apartments in the municipality. The most common apartment size was the 4 room apartment of which there were 166. There were 16 single room apartments and 121 apartments with five or more rooms. Of these apartments, a total of 372 apartments (79.1% of the total) were permanently occupied, while 89 apartments (18.9%) were seasonally occupied and 9 apartments (1.9%) were empty. As of 2007, the construction rate of new housing units was 4.6 new units per 1000 residents.

The historical population is given in the following table:

year	population
1850	347
1900	322
1950	414
1970	569
1990	798
2000	887

== Sights ==
The entire village of Verscio is designated as part of the Inventory of Swiss Heritage Sites.

== Politics ==
In the 2007 federal election the most popular party was the FDP which received 32.68% of the vote. The next three most popular parties were the SP (23.05%), the Ticino League (14.16%) and the CVP (14.13%). In the federal election, a total of 359 votes were cast, and the voter turnout was 49.4%.

In the 2007 Gran Consiglio election, there were a total of 715 registered voters in Verscio, of which 478 or 66.9% voted. 9 blank ballots were cast, leaving 469 valid ballots in the election. The most popular party was the PLRT which received 104 or 22.2% of the vote. The next three most popular parties were; the PS (with 99 or 21.1%), the SSI (with 87 or 18.6%) and the LEGA (with 72 or 15.4%).

In the 2007 Consiglio di Stato election, 4 blank ballots and 5 null ballots were cast, leaving 469 valid ballots in the election. The most popular party was the PS which received 110 or 23.5% of the vote. The next three most popular parties were; the LEGA (with 109 or 23.2%), the PLRT (with 106 or 22.6%) and the SSI (with 66 or 14.1%).

== Economy ==
As of 2007, Verscio had an unemployment rate of 2.4%. As of 2005, there were 12 people employed in the primary economic sector and about 5 businesses involved in this sector. 72 people were employed in the secondary sector and there were 8 businesses in this sector. 126 people were employed in the tertiary sector, with 34 businesses in this sector. There were 401 residents of the municipality who were employed in some capacity, of which females made up 36.4% of the workforce.

In 2000, there were 202 workers who commuted into the municipality and 294 workers who commuted away. The municipality is a net exporter of workers, with about 1.5 workers leaving the municipality for every one entering. About 21.8% of the workforce coming into Verscio are coming from outside Switzerland. Of the working population, 7.5% used public transportation to get to work, and 65.3% used a private car.

== Religion ==
From the 2000 census, 629 or 70.9% were Roman Catholic, while 99 or 11.2% belonged to the Swiss Reformed Church. There are 128 individuals (or about 14.43% of the population) who belong to another church (not listed on the census), and 31 individuals (or about 3.49% of the population) did not answer the question.

== Education ==
In Verscio about 77.8% of the population (between age 25-64) have completed either non-mandatory upper secondary education or additional higher education (either university or a Fachhochschule).

In Verscio there were a total of 242 students (as of 2009). The Ticino education system provides up to three years of non-mandatory kindergarten and in Verscio there were 39 children in kindergarten. The primary school program lasts for five years and includes both a standard school and a special school. In the village, 77 students attended the standard primary schools and 2 students attended the special school. In the lower secondary school system, students either attend a two-year middle school followed by a two-year pre-apprenticeship or they attend a four-year program to prepare for higher education. There were 56 students in the two-year middle school, while 35 students were in the four-year advanced program.

The upper secondary school includes several options, but at the end of the upper secondary program, a student will be prepared to enter a trade or to continue on to a university or college. In Ticino, vocational students may either attend school while working on their internship or apprenticeship (which takes three or four years) or may attend school followed by an internship or apprenticeship (which takes one year as a full-time student or one and a half to two years as a part-time student). There were 7 vocational students who were attending school full-time and 23 who attend part-time.

The professional program lasts three years and prepares a student for a job in engineering, nursing, computer science, business, tourism and similar fields. There were 3 students in the professional program.

As of 2000, there were 16 students in Verscio who came from another municipality, while 65 residents attended schools outside the municipality.

Verscio is the site of the Scuola Teatro Dimitri, a small performing arts college in the Swiss national higher education system with emphasis on physical theatre, founded as a clown school by the Swiss clown Dimitri.
