= Avegno Gordevio =

- Municipality
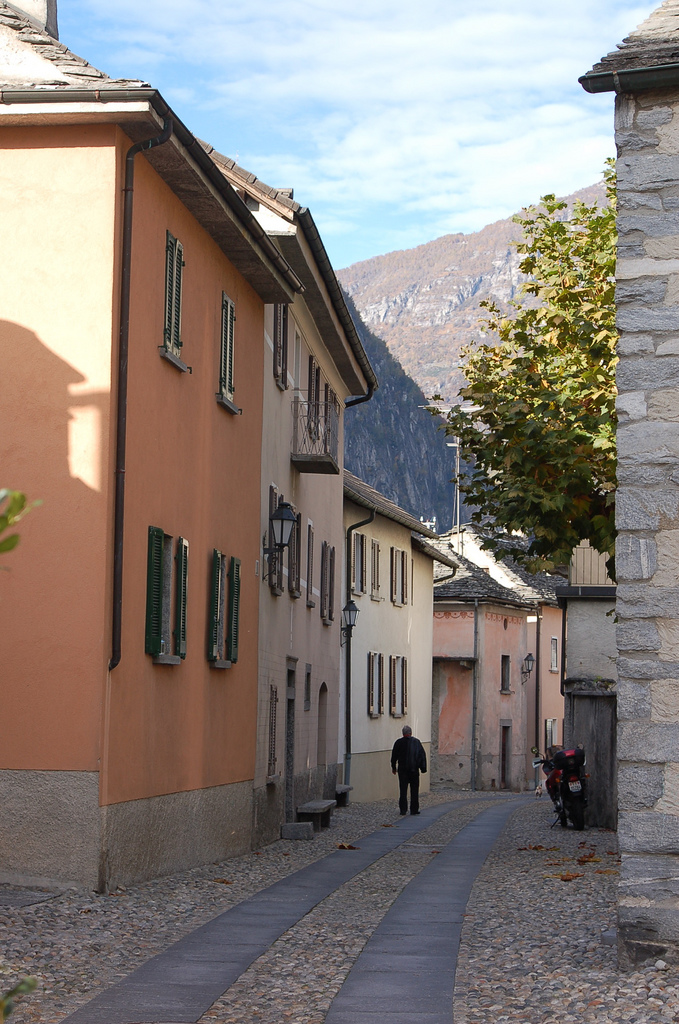
- Avegno village

- Flag Coat of arms
- Location of Avegno Gordevio
- Location within Switzerland Location within Canton of Ticino
- Coordinates: 46°12′N 8°45′E
- Country: Switzerland
- Canton: Ticino
- District: Vallemaggia

Government
  - Mayor: Sindaca; Roberta Iuva (as of 2024-04-20)

Area
  - Total: 27.4 km^{2} (10.6 sq mi)
- Elevation: 293 m (961 ft)

Population (December 2007)
  - Total: 1,379
  - Density: 50.3/km^{2} (130/sq mi)
- Time zone: UTC+01:00 (CET)
  - Summer (DST): UTC+02:00 (CEST)
- Postal code: 6670
- SFOS number: 5324
- ISO 3166 code: CH-TI
- Localities: Avegno, Gordevio
- Surrounded by: Brione sopra Minusio, Brione (Verzasca), Corippo, Lavertezzo, Locarno, Maggia, Mergoscia, Minusio, Orselina, Tegna, Verscio
- Website: www.avegnogordevio.ch

Avegno Gordevio is a municipality in the district of Vallemaggia in the canton of Ticino in Switzerland. It was formed on 20 April 2008 when Avegno and Gordevio were merged.

== History ==
Aerial view (1962)

Avegno is first mentioned in 1189 as Vegno. Gordevio is first mentioned in 1200 as de gordauio. In 1335 it was mentioned as de Gordavio.

=== Avegno ===
In the 14th century, Avegno shared a chaplain with Gordevio. In 1645, they separated from the mother church in Maggia, and became separate parishes. The parish church of SS Luca e Abbondio was built in 1313. In the 17th century it was expanded and the rich stucco work was added.

Agriculture, formerly the main occupation of the inhabitants, is today almost non-existent. Handicrafts (making baskets and pottery) and stone cutting were able to slow the exodus somewhat. The strong population growth in recent decades is due to the proximity to Locarno. Some companies have settled in the valley and various sports facilities and campsites have been created. In 1982, the Wakker Prize was awarded to Avegno in recognition of the efforts to preserve the village's historic appearance.

=== Gordevio ===
The parish church of SS Giacomo e Filippo, is first mentioned in the 13th century. The current building was built in the 17th century on the remains of a previous church from the 14th century. It contains paintings by Giovanni Antonio Vanoni (19th century) and probably by Giuseppe Antonio Felice Orelli, who created frescoes in the adjacent ossuary in 1753. In village of Brièè, in 1666, the chapel of S. Antonio Abate was built. In the 14th century both Gordevio and Avegno had their own chaplain. The two villages broke away from the mother church in Maggia, and parted from each other probably about 1645.

The village center contains some houses from the 19th century. Due to lack of farming land, emigration (at first mainly to Rome, but in the second half of the 19th century overseas as well) lowered the number of inhabitants. In the last decades of the 20th century, the population has risen again. This increase is mainly due to its proximity to agglomeration of Locarno. Agricultural jobs have practically disappeared from the village.

== Coat of arms ==
The present coat of arms was adopted in 2008, replacing those of the two previous municipalities: Tierced per pale gules, argent and azure, overall a crenellated gateway between two towers triple-turreted argent masoned sable, in centre base the capital letters A and G in pale of the last.

== Demographics ==
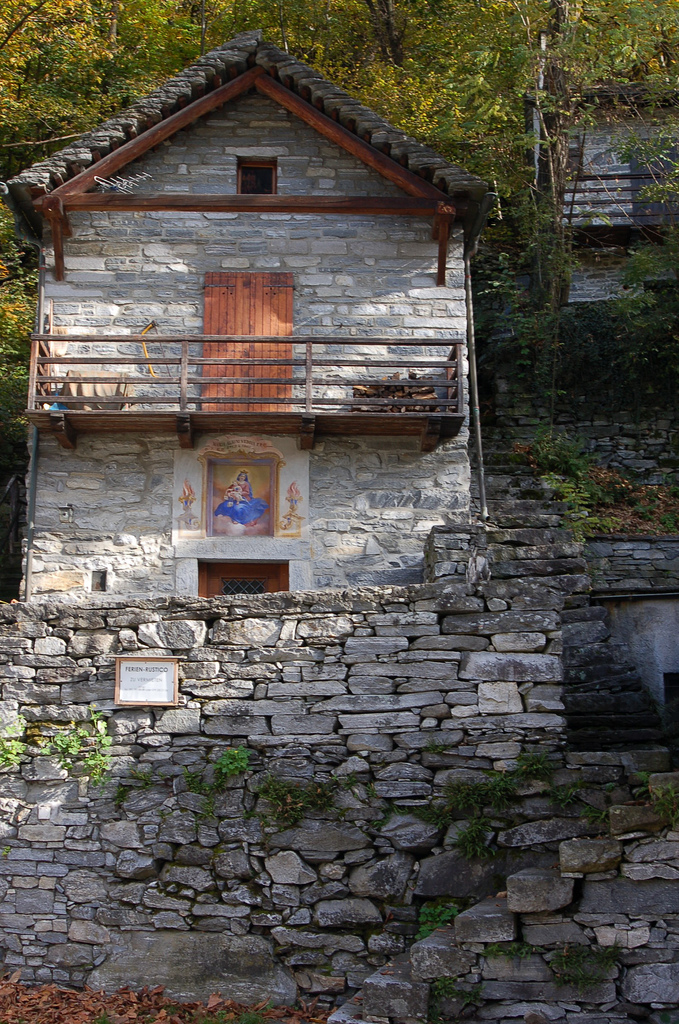
House in Gordevio

Avegno Gordevio has a population (as of December 2020) of 1,516, all Swiss citizens.

As of 2008, the gender distribution of the population was 47.5% male and 52.5% female. The population was made up of 608 Swiss men (43.1% of the population), and 62 (4.4%) non-Swiss men. There were 678 Swiss women (48.0%), and 64 (4.5%) non-Swiss women.

In 2008 there were 12 live births to Swiss citizens and 1 birth to non-Swiss citizens, and in same time span there were 13 deaths of Swiss citizens and 1 non-Swiss citizen death. Ignoring immigration and emigration, the population of Swiss citizens decreased by 1 while the foreign population remained the same. There were 3 Swiss men and 15 Swiss women who immigrated back to Switzerland. At the same time, there were 5 non-Swiss men and 2 non-Swiss women who immigrated from another country to Switzerland. The total Swiss population change in 2008 (from all sources, including moves across municipal borders) was an increase of 21 and the non-Swiss population change was a decrease of 1 people. This represents a population growth rate of 1.5%.

The age distribution, as of 2009, in Avegno Gordevio is; 142 children or 10.1% of the population are between 0 and 9 years old and 190 teenagers or 13.5% are between 10 and 19. Of the adult population, 122 people or 8.6% of the population are between 20 and 29 years old. 167 people or 11.8% are between 30 and 39, 230 people or 16.3% are between 40 and 49, and 202 people or 14.3% are between 50 and 59. The senior population distribution is 169 people or 12.0% of the population are between 60 and 69 years old, 102 people or 7.2% are between 70 and 79, there are 88 people or 6.2% who are over 80.

== Historic Population ==
The historical population is given in the following chart:

== Sights ==
The entire villages of Avegno Chiesa e di dentro and Avegno di fuori are designated as part of the Inventory of Swiss Heritage Sites

== Economy ==
In 2008 the total number of full-time equivalent jobs was 370. The number of jobs in the primary sector was 36, of which 16 were in agricultureand 20 were in forestry or lumber production. The number of jobs in the secondary sector was 157, of which 129 or (82.2%) were in manufacturing and 21 (13.4%) were in construction. The number of jobs in the tertiary sector was 177. In the tertiary sector; 20 or 11.3% were in wholesale or retail sales or the repair of motor vehicles, 4 or 2.3% were in the movement and storage of goods, 50 or 28.2% were in a hotel or restaurant, 1 or 0.6% were in the information industry, 6 or 3.4% were technical professionals or scientists, 4 or 2.3% were in education and 56 or 31.6% were in health care.

As of 2009, there were 3 hotels in Avegno Gordevio with a total of 15 rooms and 33 beds.

== Education ==
In Avegno Gordevio there were a total of 298 students (as of 2009). The Ticino education system provides up to three years of non-mandatory kindergarten and in Avegno Gordevio there were 43 children in kindergarten. The primary school program lasts for five years. In the village, 88 students attended the standard primary schools. In the lower secondary school system, students either attend a two-year middle school followed by a two-year pre-apprenticeship or they attend a four-year program to prepare for higher education. There were 88 students in the two-year middle school, while 32 students were in the four-year advanced program.

The upper secondary school includes several options, but at the end of the upper secondary program, a student will be prepared to enter a trade or to continue on to a university or college. In Ticino, vocational students may either attend school while working on their internship or apprenticeship (which takes three or four years) or may attend school followed by an internship or apprenticeship (which takes one year as a full-time student or one and a half to two years as a part-time student). There were 13 vocational students who were attending school full-time and 27 who attend part-time.

The professional program lasts three years and prepares a student for a job in engineering, nursing, computer science, business, tourism and similar fields. There were 7 students in the professional program.
