= Piero Bianconi =

Swiss-Italian writer and academic

Piero Bianconi (1 June 1899 in Minusio – 5 June 1984 in Minusio) was a Swiss-Italian writer and academic.

He was the son of Alessandro and Margherita Rusconi and the brother of the poet Giovanni Bianconi. He graduated in Italian literature from the University of Freiburg, and in 1935 received his doctorate. Between 1935 and 1936 he was reader in Italian at the University of Bern.

== Biography ==
The son of Alessandro Bianconi and Margherita, née Rusconi, he was born in Minusio but the family was originally from Mergoscia. He was the brother of Giovanni Bianconi and was married to Cecilia Lombardi.

After a commercial apprenticeship, he obtained his master's license (1927) and began attending the University of Freiburg.

From 1932 to 1934 he stayed in Florence and Rome, where he worked on his thesis and took courses in art history from Pietro Toesca. Here he made friends with writers, poets and critics mainly from the Catholic area and among those who revolved around the magazine Il Frontespizio (Bargellini, Betocchi, Bo, Don De Luca) from whom he developed a taste for the fragment and stylistically elegant prose.

He returned to Switzerland and completed his studies in Italian literature at the University of Fribourg with a thesis on Giovanni Pascoli in 1935. While in Switzerland, he was a lecturer in Italian at the University of Bern from 1935 to 1936. He then taught French and art history at the Locarno Teacher Training School and Lugano High School.

Bianconi began his literary activity with Ritagli, a collection of short texts that immediately revealed a strong taste for formal elegance and friendly words. This was followed by Croci e rascane, a significant first stage within Bianconi's prose: the interest in the humanity of the village is remarkable, as is the discovery of the baroque character of Canton Ticino.

He has translated Honoré de Balzac,Charles Baudelaire,Samuel Butler, Diderot, Flaubert, Johann Wolfgang von Goethe, Charles-Ferdinand Ramuz, Rousseau, Stendhal, and Voltaire, among others, and produced essays on Francesco Borromini, Hieronymus Bosch, Pieter Bruegel,Antonio da Correggio,Matthias Grünewald,Lorenzo Lotto, Piero della Francesca, and Félix Vallotton.

== Works ==
- Ticino Arte, in Enciclopedia italiana, Istituto dell'Enciclopedia Italiana, Roma 1938, 820–822;
- Arte in Leventina, (con Arminio Janner, Istituto Editoriale Ticinese, Bellinzona 1939;
- Arte in Blenio. Guida della Valle, S.A. Grassi & Co., Bellinzona-Lugano 1944;
- Bellinzona e le Valli superiori del Ticino, La Baconnière, Neuchâtel 1948;
- Inventario delle cose d'Arte e di Antichità. I. Le Tre Valli Superiori. Leventina. Blenio. Riviera, S.A. Grassi & Co., Bellinzona 1948;
- Bartolomeo e Bernardino, in «Svizzera Italiana», 101, 1953, 9-20;
- Il polittico Torriani e la nostra «emigrazione» artistica, in «Svizzera Italiana», 103, 1953, 1–13;
- Sospetti bramantineschi, in «Svizzera Italiana», 104, 1954, 12–14;
- Bramantino, Fabbri, Milano 1965;
- La Pietà alla Madonna del Sasso. Locarno, in «Cooperazione», 13, 29 marzo 1969, 3;
- Albero genealogico, Pantarei, Lugano 1969;
- Occhi sul Ticino, con foto di Alberto Flammer, Tipografia Stazione SA - Locarno, 1972;
- Diario (1948-1949), in Renato Martinoni, Sabina Geiser Foglia (a cura di), Antologia di scritti, Armando Dadò Editore, Locarno 2001, 319–324;
- I ponti rotti di Locarno. Saggio sul Cinquecento, in «L'silio dei protestanit Locarnesi», 227–258, Armando Dadò Editore, Locarno 2005, ISBN 88-8281-170-0

== Bibliography ==
- (in Italian) Mario Agliati, Per i settant'anni di Piero Bianconi (31 maggio 1969), in «Il Cantonetto», XVI-XVII, 1–2, Lugano 1969, 7–11.
- (in Italian) AA.VV., Per gli ottant'anni di Piero Bianconi, Tipografia Pedrazzini, Locarno 1979.
- (in Italian) Giovanni Orelli, Svizzera italiana, Editrice La Scuola, Brescia 1986, 157–161.
- (in Italian) Luciano Vaccaro, Giuseppe Chiesi, Fabrizio Panzera, Terre del Ticino. Diocesi di Lugano, Editrice La Scuola, Brescia 2003.
