= Avegno =

Avegno may refer to:

== Places ==
Italy

- Avegno, Liguria, a comune in the Province of Genova

Switzerland

- Avegno, Switzerland, a former comune in the Canton of Ticino
- Avegno Gordevio, a comune in the Canton of Ticino

== People with the surname ==
- Anggie Avegno (born 1996), Ecuadorian canoeist
- Virginie Amélie Avegno Gautreau (1859–1915), American socialite
