= Giovanni Bianconi =

Giovanni Bianconi may refer to:

- Giovanni Bianconi (journalist) (born 1960), Italian writer and journalist
- Giovanni Bianconi (poet) (1891–1981), Swiss-Italian poet, artist and ethnographer
- Giovanni Giuseppe Bianconi (1809–1878), Italian zoologist, herpetologist, botanist and geologist
- Giovanni Ludovico Bianconi (1717–1781), Italian doctor and antiquarian
