= Giovanni Bianconi (poet) =

Swiss-Italian poet, artist and ethnographer

- Born: 22 March 1891; Minusio, Switzerland
- Died: 7 March 1981 (aged 89); Minusio, Switzerland
- Occupations: Poet, artist, ethnographer
- Relatives: Piero Bianconi (brother)

Giovanni Bianconi (22 March 1891, Minusio, Switzerland – 7 March 1981, Minusio) was a Swiss-Italian poet, artist and ethnographer.

The son of Alessandro and Margherita Rusconi, he was the elder brother of the writer Piero Bianconi. He trained at San Gallo and the State Academy of Fine Arts Stuttgart.

== Works ==
=== Lugano Cantonal Museum of Art ===
- Piano di Magadino, 1911–1951, woodcut on tissue paper
- Terra ticinese, 1920, woodcut on card
- Barche a riva, 1920–1980, woodcut on card
- Casupole a Minusio, 1920–1980, woodcut on card
- Lago Maggiore, 1920–1980, woodcut on card
- Nevicata, 1920–1980, woodcut on card
- Portrait of Giuseppe Zoppi aged 30, 1926, woodcut on card
- Discussione (Neutralità), 1930–1940, woodcut on card
- Vecchia Locarno, 1955, woodcut on card
- Cerimonia funebre, undated, oil on panel
- Solduno, 1946, woodcut on card

=== Other ===
- Val Verzasca, 1966
- Ticino rurale, 1971
- Legni e versi, 1978
- Costruzioni contadine ticinesi, 1982

== Bibliography ==
- Giovanni Orelli, Svizzera italiana, Editrice La Scuola, Brescia 1986, 148-150.
