= Tenero-Contra =

- Municipality
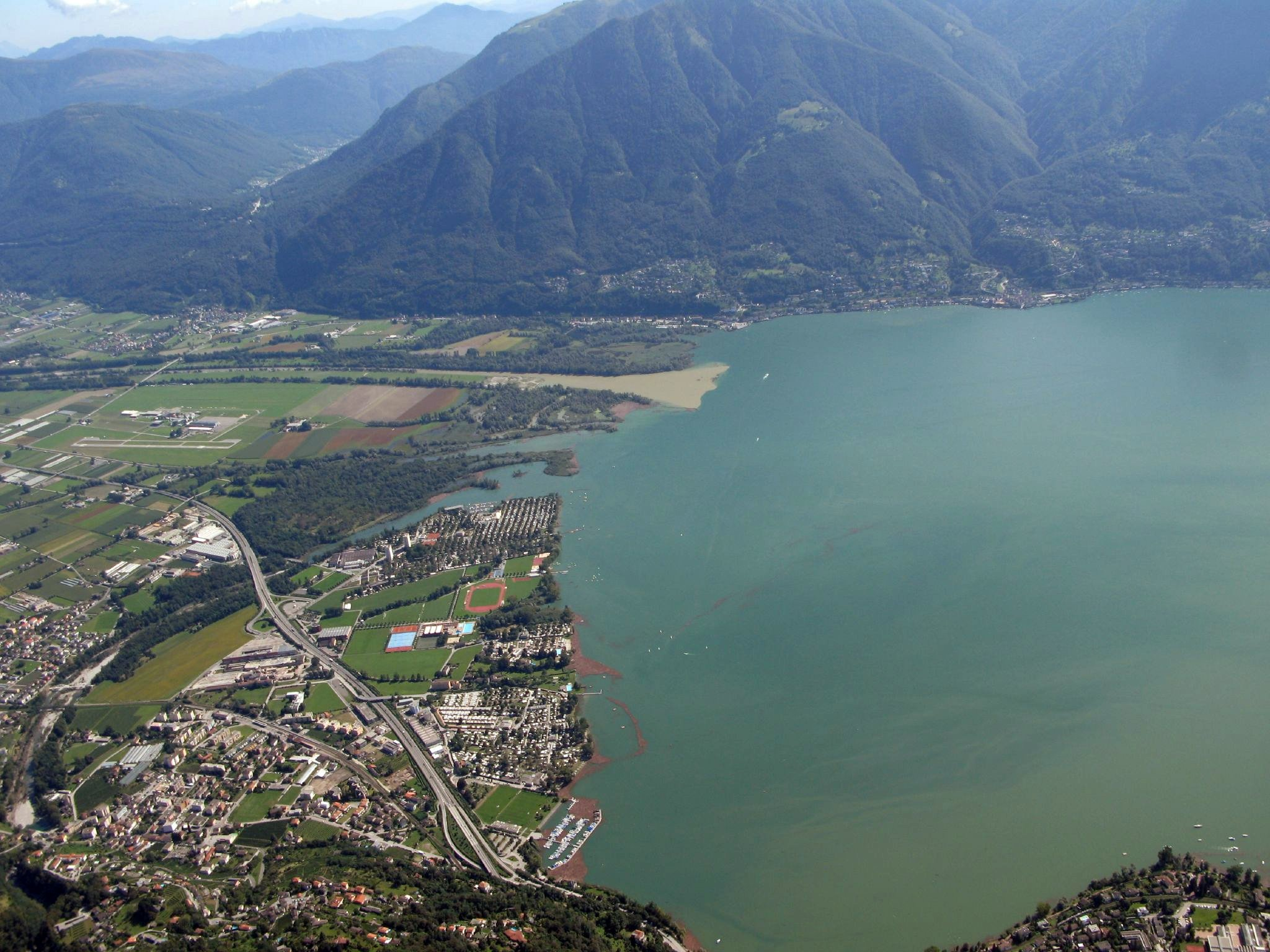

- Flag Coat of arms
- Location of Tenero-Contra
- Location within Switzerland Location within Canton of Ticino
- Coordinates: 46°11′N 8°51′E
- Country: Switzerland
- Canton: Ticino
- District: Locarno

Government
  - Mayor: Sindaco; Paolo Galliciotti Partito Liberale Radicale

Area
  - Total: 3.69 km^{2} (1.42 sq mi)
- Elevation: 202 m (663 ft)

Population (December 2016)
  - Total: 3,024
  - Density: 820/km^{2} (2,120/sq mi)
- Time zone: UTC+01:00 (CET)
  - Summer (DST): UTC+02:00 (CEST)
- Postal code: 6598
- SFOS number: 5131
- ISO 3166 code: CH-TI
- Surrounded by: Brione sopra Minusio, Gambarogno, Gordola, Locarno, Mergoscia, Minusio
- Website: www.tenero-contra.ch

Tenero-Contra is a municipality in the district of Locarno in the canton of Ticino in Switzerland.

== Geography ==
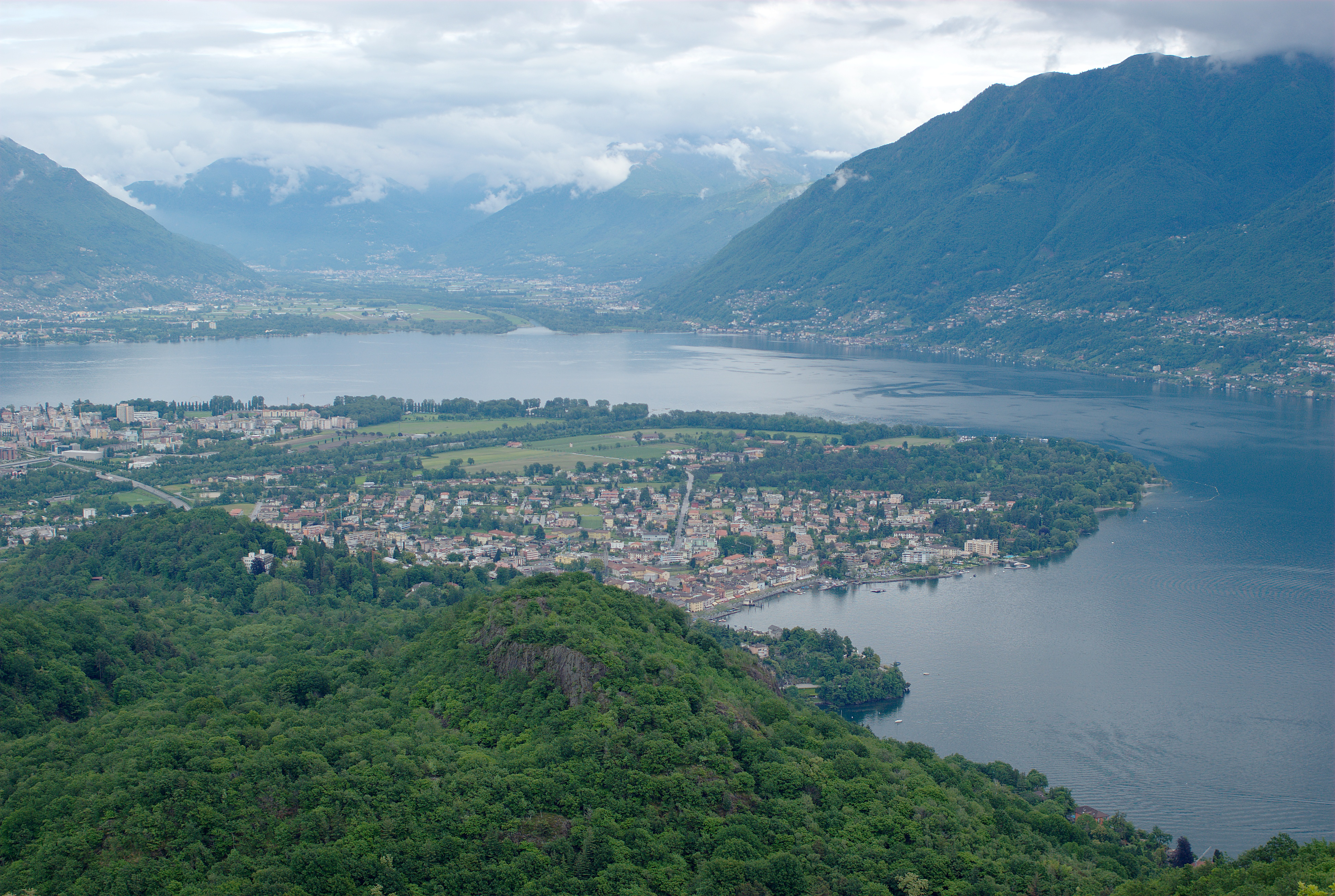
View of Lago Maggiore. Foreground (l-r) Locarno, Ascona. Background (l-r) Tenero-Contra, Gordola, Gambarogno

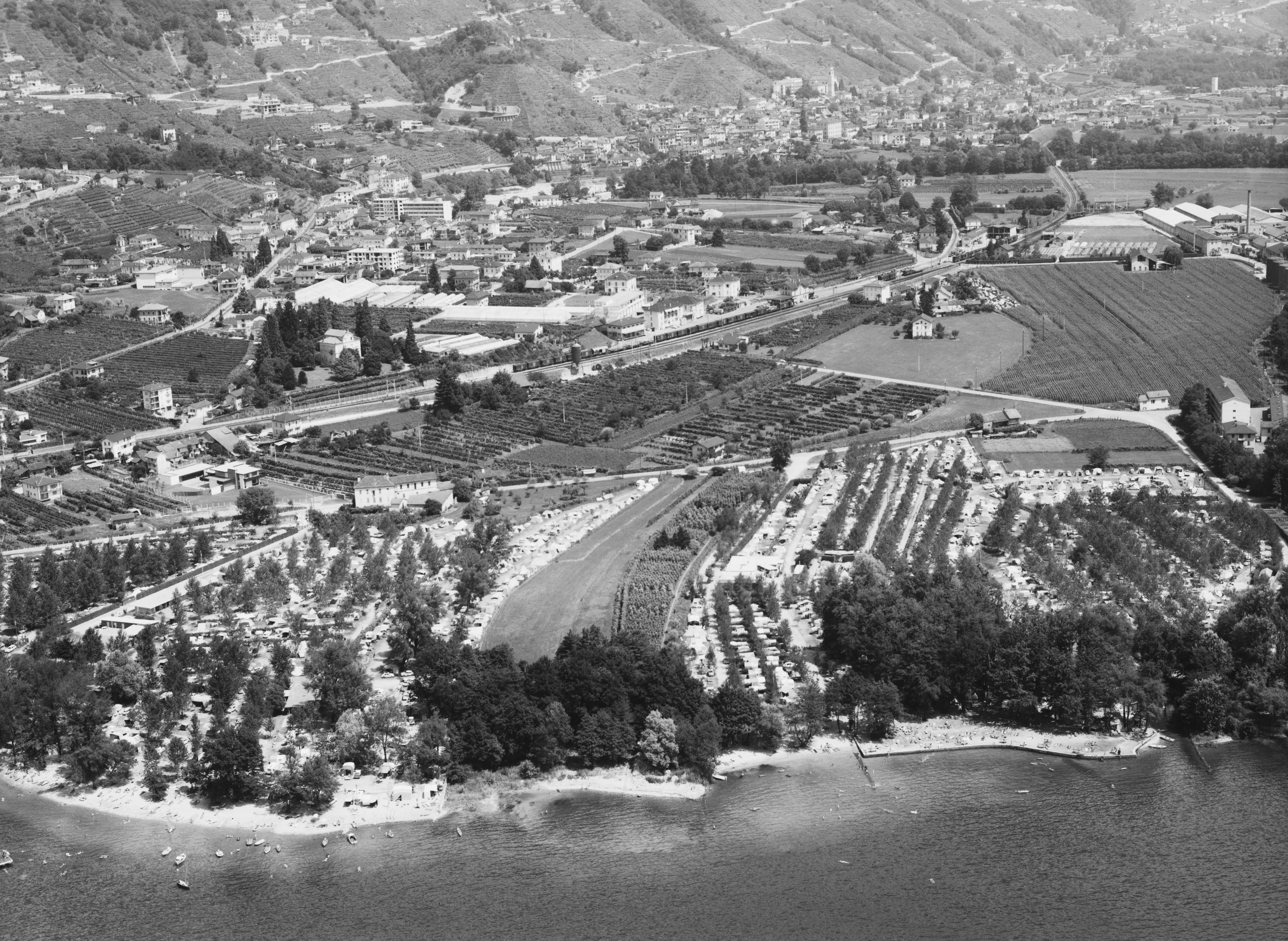
Aerial view (1964)

Tenero-Contra has an area, as of 1997, of 3.69 square kilometers (1.42 sq mi). Of this area, 1.01 km^{2} (0.39 sq mi) or 27.4% is used for agricultural purposes, while 1.68 km^{2} (0.65 sq mi) or 45.5% is forested. Of the rest of the land, 1.33 km^{2} (0.51 sq mi) or 36.0% is settled (buildings or roads), 0.07 km^{2} (17 acres) or 1.9% is either rivers or lakes and 0.07 km^{2} (17 acres) 1.9% is unproductive land.

Of the built up area, industrial buildings made up 1.9% of the total area while housing and buildings made up 13.3% and transportation infrastructure made up 7.3%. Power and water infrastructure as well as other special developed areas made up 1.1% of the area while parks, green belts and sports fields made up 12.5%. Out of the forested land, 43.6% of the total land area is heavily forested and 1.9% is covered with orchards or small clusters of trees. Of the agricultural land, 10.6% is used for growing crops, while 3.5% is used for orchards or vine crops and 13.3% is used for alpine pastures. Of the water in the municipality, 1.6% is in lakes and 0.3% is in rivers and streams. Of the unproductive areas, 1.4% is too rocky for vegetation.

== Demographics ==
Tenero-Contra has a population (as of December 2020) of 3,201. As of 2008, 26.2% of the population are resident foreign nationals. Over the last 10 years (1997–2007) the population has changed at a rate of 9.2%.

Most of the population (as of 2000) speaks Italian (79.5%), with German being second most common (12.1%) and Serbo-Croatian being third (1.7%). Of the Swiss national languages (as of 2000), 277 speak German, 32 people speak French, 1,824 people speak Italian, and 3 people speak Romansh. The remainder (159 people) speak another language.

As of 2008, the gender distribution of the population was 48.3% male and 51.7% female. The population was made up of 906 Swiss men (34.6% of the population), and 357 (13.6%) non-Swiss men. There were 1,035 Swiss women (39.5%), and 319 (12.2%) non-Swiss women.

In 2008 there were 16 live births to Swiss citizens and 6 births to non-Swiss citizens, and in same time span there were 23 deaths of Swiss citizens and 3 non-Swiss citizen deaths. Ignoring immigration and emigration, the population of Swiss citizens decreased by 7 while the foreign population increased by 3. There were 4 Swiss men and 2 Swiss women who immigrated back to Switzerland. At the same time, there were 8 non-Swiss men and 11 non-Swiss women who immigrated from another country to Switzerland. The total Swiss population change in 2008 (from all sources, including moves across municipal borders) was an increase of 61 and the non-Swiss population change was an increase of 5 people. This represents a population growth rate of 2.7%.

The age distribution, as of 2009, in Tenero-Contra is; 267 children or 10.2% of the population are between 0 and 9 years old and 266 teenagers or 10.2% are between 10 and 19. Of the adult population, 274 people or 10.5% of the population are between 20 and 29 years old. 328 people or 12.5% are between 30 and 39, 455 people or 17.4% are between 40 and 49, and 315 people or 12.0% are between 50 and 59. The senior population distribution is 342 people or 13.1% of the population are between 60 and 69 years old, 210 people or 8.0% are between 70 and 79, there are 160 people or 6.1% who are over 80.

As of 2000, there were 992 private households in the municipality, and an average of 2.3 persons per household. In 2000 there were 335 single family homes (or 64.1% of the total) out of a total of 523 inhabited buildings. There were 75 two family buildings (14.3%) and 74 multi-family buildings (14.1%). There were also 39 buildings in the municipality that were multipurpose buildings (used for both housing and commercial or another purpose).

The vacancy rate for the municipality, in 2008, was 1.07%. In 2000 there were 1,275 apartments in the municipality. The most common apartment size was the 4 room apartment of which there were 396. There were 53 single room apartments and 172 apartments with five or more rooms. Of these apartments, a total of 990 apartments (77.6% of the total) were permanently occupied, while 220 apartments (17.3%) were seasonally occupied and 65 apartments (5.1%) were empty. As of 2007, the construction rate of new housing units was 9.7 new units per 1000 residents.

The historical population is given in the following table:

year	population
1850	198
1900	557
1950	966
1970	1,690
1990	1,867
2000	2,295

The Australian-born Nobel Prize winner Sir John Carew Eccles (1903–1997) lived and died in Tenero-Contra.

== Politics ==
In the 2007 federal election the most popular party was the FDP which received 23.41% of the vote. The next three most popular parties were the SP (20.47%), the CVP (19.7%) and the Ticino League (15.96%). In the federal election, a total of 651 votes were cast, and the voter turnout was 44.4%.

In the 2007 Gran Consiglio election, there were a total of 1,390 registered voters in Tenero-Contra, of which 844 or 60.7% voted. 12 blank ballots and 1 null ballot were cast, leaving 831 valid ballots in the election. The most popular party was the PS which received 183 or 22.0% of the vote. The next three most popular parties were; the SSI (with 156 or 18.8%), the PLRT (with 144 or 17.3%) and the LEGA (with 126 or 15.2%).

In the 2007 Consiglio di Stato election, 6 blank ballots and 6 null ballots were cast, leaving 832 valid ballots in the election. The most popular party was the PS which received 198 or 23.8% of the vote. The next three most popular parties were; the LEGA (with 176 or 21.2%), the SSI (with 137 or 16.5%) and the PLRT (with 136 or 16.3%).

== Economy ==
As of 2007, Tenero-Contra had an unemployment rate of 4.42%. As of 2005, there were 29 people employed in the primary economic sector and about 13 businesses involved in this sector. 344 people were employed in the secondary sector and there were 26 businesses in this sector. 654 people were employed in the tertiary sector, with 94 businesses in this sector. There were 1,066 residents of the municipality who were employed in some capacity, of which females made up 40.4% of the workforce.

In 2000, there were 854 workers who commuted into the municipality and 692 workers who commuted away. The municipality is a net importer of workers, with about 1.2 workers entering the municipality for every one leaving. About 22.1% of the workforce coming into Tenero-Contra are coming from outside Switzerland. Of the working population, 10.4% used public transportation to get to work, and 56.8% used a private car. As of 2009, there were 5 hotels in Tenero-Contra with a total of 60 rooms and 121 beds.

== Religion ==
From the 2000 census, 1,764 or 76.9% were Roman Catholic, while 222 or 9.7% belonged to the Swiss Reformed Church. There are 231 individuals (or about 10.07% of the population) who belong to another church (not listed on the census), and 78 individuals (or about 3.40% of the population) did not answer the question.

== Education ==
In Tenero-Contra about 63.5% of the population (between age 25-64) have completed either non-mandatory upper secondary education or additional higher education (either university or a Fachhochschule).

In Tenero-Contra there were a total of 415 students (as of 2009). The Ticino education system provides up to three years of non-mandatory kindergarten and in Tenero-Contra there were 61 children in kindergarten. The primary school program lasts for five years and includes both a standard school and a special school. In the village, 144 students attended the standard primary schools and 4 students attended the special school. In the lower secondary school system, students either attend a two-year middle school followed by a two-year pre-apprenticeship or they attend a four-year program to prepare for higher education. There were 108 students in the two-year middle school and 2 in their pre-apprenticeship, while 25 students were in the four-year advanced program.

The upper secondary school includes several options, but at the end of the upper secondary program, a student will be prepared to enter a trade or to continue on to a university or college. In Ticino, vocational students may either attend school while working on their internship or apprenticeship (which takes three or four years) or may attend school followed by an internship or apprenticeship (which takes one year as a full-time student or one and a half to two years as a part-time student). There were 19 vocational students who were attending school full-time and 52 who attend part-time.

As of 2000, there were 13 students in Tenero-Contra who came from another municipality, while 204 residents attended schools outside the municipality.

== Transportation ==
The municipality has a railway station, Tenero, on the Giubiasco–Locarno line.
