= Brione sopra Minusio =

- Municipality
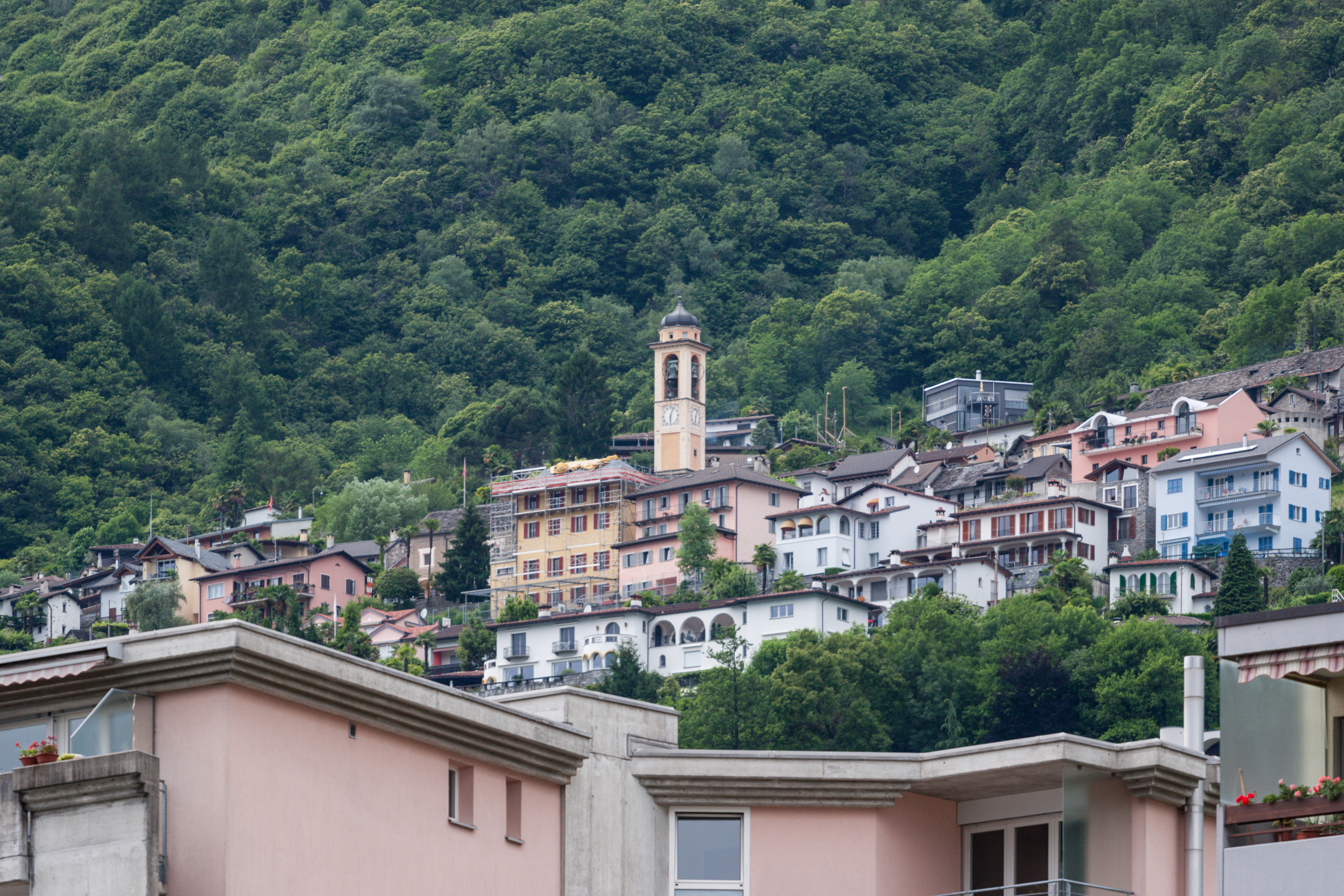

- Flag Coat of arms
- Location of Brione sopra Minusio
- Location within Switzerland Location within Canton of Ticino
- Coordinates: 46°11′N 8°49′E
- Country: Switzerland
- Canton: Ticino
- District: Locarno

Government
  - Mayor: Sindaco

Area
  - Total: 3.8 km^{2} (1.5 sq mi)
- Elevation: 486 m (1,594 ft)

Population (December 2004)
  - Total: 536
  - Density: 140/km^{2} (370/sq mi)
- Time zone: UTC+01:00 (CET)
  - Summer (DST): UTC+02:00 (CEST)
- Postal code: 6645
- SFOS number: 5096
- ISO 3166 code: CH-TI
- Surrounded by: Avegno, Mergoscia, Minusio, Tenero-Contra
- Website: http://www.brione.ch SFSO statistics

Brione sopra Minusio is a municipality in the district of Locarno in the canton of Ticino in Switzerland.

== History ==
Brione sopra Minusio is first mentioned in 1313 as Briono.

Before 1479 Brione and Minusio formed a Vicinanza, which also included Mergoscia until 1313. Between 1479 and 1577 it began taking steps to become an independent municipality. However, until 1952, some common property was shared between Brione sopra Minusio and other communities, which led to some conflicts.

The church of S. Maria Lauretana was built in 1558–59, and in the second half of the 19th Century it was rebuilt. Until 1662 it belonged to S. Vittore at Locarno. It was granted a chaplain in 1662 and a parish vicar in 1777.

Traditionally, the cultivation of wine, fruit, cereals and hemp as well as grazing were the main occupations of the inhabitants. They had grazing rights in the Magadino valley. The scarcity of land forced many of the residents to emigrate. In 1990 more than 75% of the workforce worked in the services sector, mostly in tourism. The municipality is home to many tourism facilities and second homes, and about 35% of the population are not native Italian speakers.

Aerial view (1953)

== Coat of arms ==
The blazon of the municipality's coat of arms is: Azure, in base a mount of five coupeaux supporting a donkey passant argent and in chief three mullets of five points or.

== Geography ==
Brione sopra Minusio has an area, as of 1997, of 3.84 square kilometers (1.48 sq mi). Of this area, 0.33 km^{2} (0.13 sq mi) or 8.6% is used for agricultural purposes, while 2.65 km^{2} (1.02 sq mi) or 69.0% is forested. Of the rest of the land, 0.34 km^{2} (0.13 sq mi) or 8.9% is settled (buildings or roads), 0.02 km^{2} (4.9 acres) or 0.5% is either rivers or lakes and 0.36 km^{2} (0.14 sq mi) or 9.4% is unproductive land.

Of the built up area, housing and buildings made up 6.8% and transportation infrastructure made up 1.3%. Out of the forested land, 56.3% of the total land area is heavily forested and 5.7% is covered with orchards or small clusters of trees. Of the agricultural land, 1.3% is used for growing crops and 6.8% is used for alpine pastures. All the water in the municipality is flowing water. Of the unproductive areas, 9.1% is unproductive vegetation.

The municipality is located in the Locarno district, about 4 km (2.5 mi) north-east of Locarno.

== Demographics ==
Brione sopra Minusio has a population (as of December 2020) of 480. As of 2008, 19.3% of the population are resident foreign nationals. Over the last 10 years (1997–2007) the population has changed at a rate of 11.4%.

Most of the population (as of 2000) speaks Italian (61.0%), with German being second most common (33.1%) and Portuguese being third (2.5%). Of the Swiss national languages (as of 2000), 160 speak German, 7 people speak French, 295 people speak Italian. The remainder (22 people) speak another language.

As of 2008, the gender distribution of the population was 48.1% male and 51.9% female. The population was made up of 216 Swiss men (38.4% of the population), and 55 (9.8%) non-Swiss men. There were 235 Swiss women (41.7%), and 57 (10.1%) non-Swiss women.

In 2008 there were 2 live births to Swiss citizens and 2 births to non-Swiss citizens, and in same time span there was 1 death of Swiss citizens and 1 non-Swiss citizen death. Ignoring immigration and emigration, the population of Swiss citizens increased by 1 while the foreign population increased by 1. There were 2 Swiss men and 1 Swiss woman who immigrated back to Switzerland. At the same time, there were 3 non-Swiss men and 1 non-Swiss woman who immigrated from another country to Switzerland. The total Swiss population change in 2008 (from all sources) was an increase of 2 and the non-Swiss population change was an increase of 12 people. This represents a population growth rate of 2.6%.

The age distribution, as of 2009, in Brione sopra Minusio is; 34 children or 6.0% of the population are between 0 and 9 years old and 44 teenagers or 7.8% are between 10 and 19. Of the adult population, 42 people or 7.5% of the population are between 20 and 29 years old. 37 people or 6.6% are between 30 and 39, 97 people or 17.2% are between 40 and 49, and 91 people or 16.2% are between 50 and 59. The senior population distribution is 97 people or 17.2% of the population are between 60 and 69 years old, 75 people or 13.3% are between 70 and 79, there are 46 people or 8.2% who are over 80.

As of 2000, there were 241 private households in the municipality, and an average of 1.9 persons per household. In 2000 there were 392 single family homes (or 80.8% of the total) out of a total of 485 inhabited buildings. There were 52 two family buildings (10.7%) and 25 multi-family buildings (5.2%). There were also 16 buildings in the municipality that were multipurpose buildings (used for both housing and commercial or another purpose).

The vacancy rate for the municipality, in 2008, was 0%. In 2000 there were 612 apartments in the municipality. The most common apartment size was the 3 room apartment of which there were 176. There were 52 single room apartments and 110 apartments with five or more rooms. Of these apartments, a total of 240 apartments (39.2% of the total) were permanently occupied, while 365 apartments (59.6%) were seasonally occupied and 7 apartments (1.1%) were empty. As of 2007, the construction rate of new housing units was 12.8 new units per 1000 residents.

The historical population is given in the following table:

year	population
1596	277
1795	463
1850	639
1900	497
1950	341
1990	413
2000	484

== Politics ==
In the 2007 federal election the most popular party was the FDP which received 28.41% of the vote. The next three most popular parties were the CVP (27.69%), the SP (16.72%) and the SVP (11.23%). In the federal election, a total of 197 votes were cast, and the voter turnout was 49.1%.

In the 2007 Gran Consiglio election, there were a total of 413 registered voters in Brione sopra Minusio, of which 213 or 51.6% voted. 11 blank ballots were cast, leaving 202 valid ballots in the election. The most popular party was the PPD+GenGiova which received 60 or 29.7% of the vote. The next three most popular parties were; the PLRT (with 41 or 20.3%), the PS (with 36 or 17.8%) and the SSI (with 26 or 12.9%).

In the 2007 Consiglio di Stato election, 4 blank ballots were cast, leaving 209 valid ballots in the election. The most popular party was the PPD which received 53 or 25.4% of the vote. The next three most popular parties were; the PLRT (with 42 or 20.1%), the PS (with 40 or 19.1%) and the SSI (with 35 or 16.7%).

== Economy ==
As of 2007, Brione sopra Minusio had an unemployment rate of 3.36%. As of 2005, there were 11 people employed in the primary economic sector and about 3 businesses involved in this sector. 4 people were employed in the secondary sector and there were 2 businesses in this sector. 55 people were employed in the tertiary sector, with 17 businesses in this sector. There were 211 residents of the municipality who were employed in some capacity, of which females made up 42.7% of the workforce.

In 2000, there were 44 workers who commuted into the municipality and 147 workers who commuted away. The municipality is a net exporter of workers, with about 3.3 workers leaving the municipality for every one entering. About 18.2% of the workforce coming into Brione sopra Minusio are coming from outside Switzerland. Of the working population, 5.2% used public transportation to get to work, and 63.5% used a private car.

As of 2009, there was one hotel in Brione sopra Minusio.

== Religion ==
From the 2000 census, 319 or 65.9% were Roman Catholic, while 92 or 19.0% belonged to the Swiss Reformed Church. There are 56 individuals (or about 11.57% of the population) who belong to another church (not listed on the census), and 17 individuals (or about 3.51% of the population) did not answer the question.

== Education ==
The entire Swiss population is generally well educated. In Brione sopra Minusio about 75.2% of the population (between age 25–64) have completed either non-mandatory upper secondary education or additional higher education (either university or a Fachhochschule).

In Brione sopra Minusio there were a total of 66 students (as of 2009). The Ticino education system provides up to three years of non-mandatory kindergarten and in Brione sopra Minusio there were 5 children in kindergarten. The primary school program lasts for five years and includes both a standard school and a special school. In the municipality, 22 students attended the standard primary schools and 1 student attended the special school. In the lower secondary school system, students either attend a two-year middle school followed by a two-year pre-apprenticeship or they attend a four-year program to prepare for higher education. There were 12 students in the two-year middle school and none in their pre-apprenticeship, while 11 students were in the four-year advanced program.

The upper secondary school includes several options, but at the end of the upper secondary program, a student will be prepared to enter a trade or to continue on to a university or college. In Ticino, vocational students may either attend school while working on their internship or apprenticeship (which takes three or four years) or may attend school followed by an internship or apprenticeship (which takes one year as a full-time student or one and a half to two years as a part-time student). There were 8 vocational students who were attending school full-time and 5 who attend part-time.

The professional program lasts three years and prepares a student for a job in engineering, nursing, computer science, business, tourism and similar fields. There were 2 students in the professional program.

As of 2000, there were 9 students in Brione sopra Minusio who came from another municipality, while 47 residents attended schools outside the municipality.

== Crime ==
In 2014 the crime rate, of the over 200 crimes listed in the Swiss Criminal Code (running from murder, robbery and assault to accepting bribes and election fraud), in Brione sopra Minusio was 43.6 per thousand residents. This rate is lower than average, only 67.5% of the rate in the entire country. During the same period, the rate of drug crimes was 3.8 per thousand residents. This rate is also lower than average, only 33.3% of the rate in the district, 43.2% of the rate in the canton and is only 38.4% of the national rate. The rate of violations of immigration, visa and work permit laws was 7.6 per thousand residents. This rate is 245.5% greater than the rate in the district, 111.1% greater than the rate in the canton and is 55.1% greater than the average rate in the entire country.
