= Orselina =

- Municipality
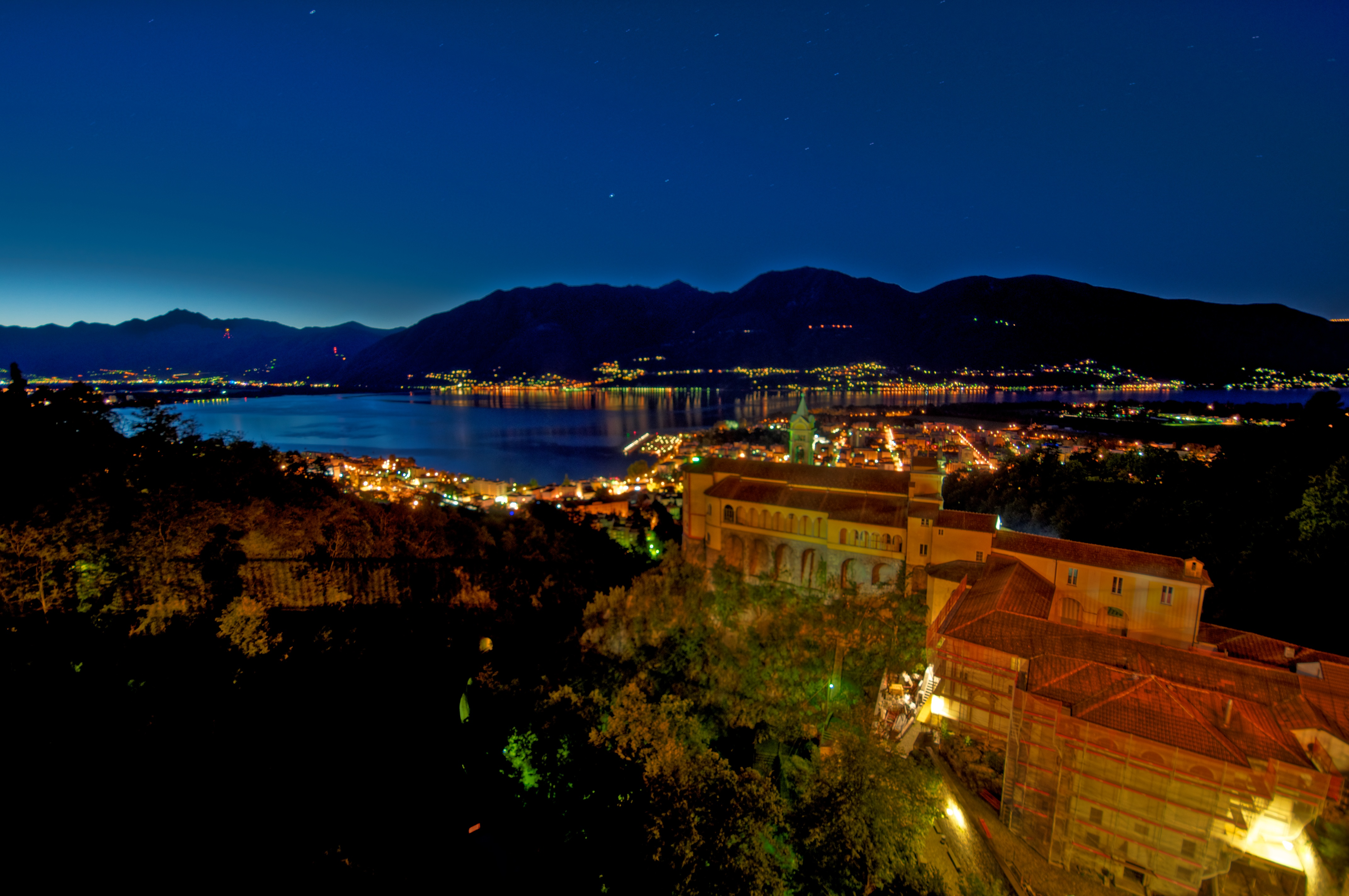

- Flag Coat of arms
- Location of Orselina
- Location within Switzerland Location within Canton of Ticino
- Coordinates: 46°11′N 8°48′E
- Country: Switzerland
- Canton: Ticino
- District: Locarno

Government
  - Mayor: Sindaco

Area
  - Total: 1.94 km^{2} (0.75 sq mi)
- Elevation: 449 m (1,473 ft)

Population (December 2004)
  - Total: 765
  - Density: 394/km^{2} (1,020/sq mi)
- Time zone: UTC+01:00 (CET)
  - Summer (DST): UTC+02:00 (CEST)
- Postal code: 6644
- SFOS number: 5121
- ISO 3166 code: CH-TI
- Surrounded by: Avegno, Locarno, Minusio, Muralto
- Website: www.orselina.ch

Orselina is a municipality in the district of Locarno in the canton of Ticino in Switzerland.

== History ==
Aerial view (1953)

Orselina is first mentioned in 1182 as Concilio Meziano. In 1323 it was mentioned as Orsarina. During the Middle Ages and into the Early Modern Period, it (along with Burbaglio and Muralto) was part of the Vicinanza of Consiglio Mezzano, which belonged to the Locarno and Ascona region. The castle SS Abbondio e Biagio was given in the 12th century as a fief by the Bishop of Como to the Muralto family. The castle was destroyed in the 14th century. The political municipality of Orselina was formed in 1803 and included Muralto. Up until 1850, Orselina dominated the municipality, thanks to the economic weight of its livestock and vineyards. However, even by the 19th century, the two towns had developed differently. While in the upper part (Orselina) the traditional socio-economic structure remained, the lower part along the lake (Muralto) grew industrially and urbanized. The differences in the towns led to a division of the municipality in 1881 into Orselina and Muralto.

The 16th-century Church of S. Bernardo was initially dependent on the Church of S. Vittore in Muralto. Starting in 1816, the church's pastor came from Locarno. It became the center of its own parish in 1966.

During 1930-80, the number of German residents surpassed that of the Italian-speaking. But by 2000, the ratio was the reversed (380 to 460). From the beginning of the 20th century, Orselina developed into a holiday and tourist destination.

== Geography ==
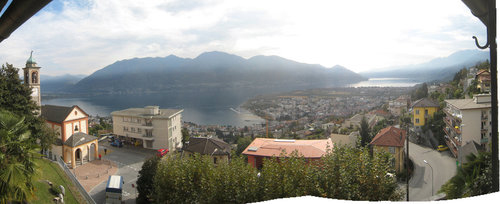
Panoramic view of the church, Orselina and Lake Maggiore.

Orselina has an area, as of 1997, of 1.94 square kilometers (0.75 sq mi). Of this area, 0.35 km^{2} (0.14 sq mi) or 18.0% is used for agricultural purposes, while 1.45 km^{2} (0.56 sq mi) or 74.7% is forested. Of the rest of the land, 0.45 km^{2} (0.17 sq mi) or 23.2% is settled (buildings or roads) and 0.03 km^{2} (7.4 acres) or 1.5% is unproductive land.

Of the built up area, housing and buildings made up 17.0% and transportation infrastructure made up 4.6%. while parks, green belts, and sports fields made up 1.5%. Out of the forested land, 69.1% of the total land area is heavily forested and 4.6% is covered with orchards or small clusters of trees. Of the agricultural land, 1.0% is used for growing crops and 17.0% is used for alpine pastures. Of the unproductive areas, 1.5% is unproductive vegetation and.

The municipality is located in the Locarno district, on a hill above Muralto. It consists of the village of Orselina and the settlement of San Bernardo.

== Coat of arms ==
The blazon of the municipal coat of arms is Argent a castle gules embattled alla Ghibellina and between its towers a fleur-de-lis of the same.

== Demographics ==
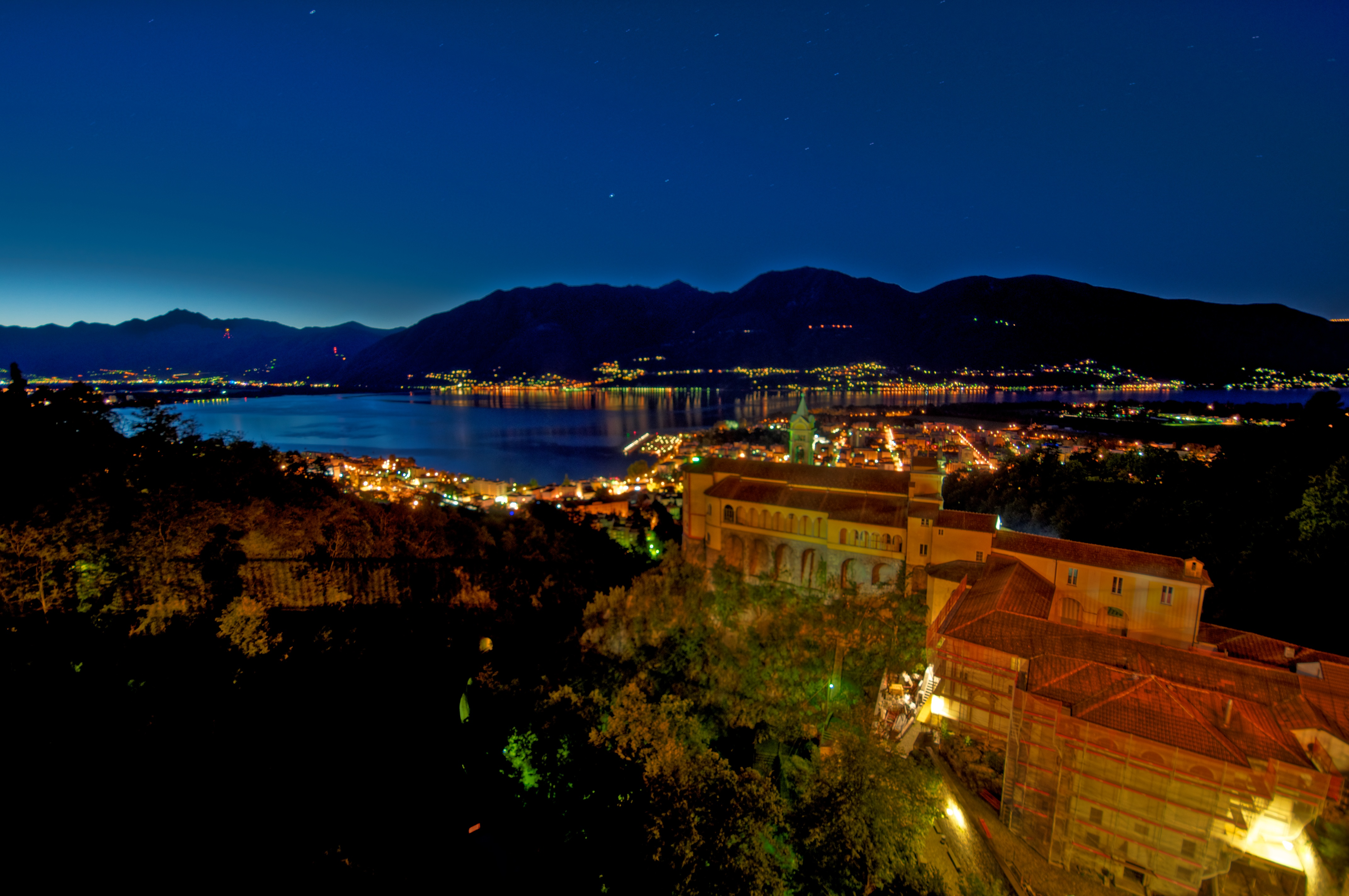
View of Orselina and Muralto at night

Orselina has a population (as of December 2020) of 706. As of 2008, 18.0% of the population are resident foreign nationals. Over the last 10 years (1997–2007) the population has changed at a rate of -3.2%.

Most of the population (as of 2000) speaks Italian (53.1%), with German being second most common (36.7%) and Dutch being third (2.7%). Of the Swiss national languages (as of 2000), 318 speak German, 18 people speak French, 460 people speak Italian, and 6 people speak Romansh. The remainder (64 people) speak another language.

As of 2008, the gender distribution of the population was 46.9% male and 53.1% female. The population was made up of 292 Swiss men (38.0% of the population), and 68 (8.9%) non-Swiss men. There were 333 Swiss women (43.4%), and 75 (9.8%) non-Swiss women.

In 2008 there were 3 live births to Swiss citizens and were 10 deaths of Swiss citizens. Ignoring immigration and emigration, the population of Swiss citizens decreased by 7 while the foreign population remained the same. There were 2 non-Swiss men and 6 non-Swiss women who immigrated from another country to Switzerland. The total Swiss population change in 2008 (from all sources, including moves across municipal borders) was a decrease of 24 and the non-Swiss population change was an increase of 5 people. This represents a population growth rate of -2.5%.

The age distribution, as of 2009, in Orselina is; 44 children or 5.7% of the population are between 0 and 9 years old and 54 teenagers or 7.0% are between 10 and 19. Of the adult population, 62 people or 8.1% of the population are between 20 and 29 years old. 65 people or 8.5% are between 30 and 39, 122 people or 15.9% are between 40 and 49, and 124 people or 16.1% are between 50 and 59. The senior population distribution is 141 people or 18.4% of the population are between 60 and 69 years old, 94 people or 12.2% are between 70 and 79, there are 62 people or 8.1% who are over 80.

As of 2000, there were 399 private households in the municipality, and an average of 1.8 persons per household. In 2000 there were 288 single family homes (or 63.0% of the total) out of a total of 457 inhabited buildings. There were 51 two family buildings (11.2%) and 91 multi-family buildings (19.9%). There were also 27 buildings in the municipality that were multipurpose buildings (used for both housing and commercial or another purpose).

The vacancy rate for the municipality, in 2008, was 0%. In 2000 there were 961 apartments in the municipality. The most common apartment size was the 3 room apartment of which there were 291. There were 108 single room apartments and 140 apartments with five or more rooms. Of these apartments, a total of 391 apartments (40.7% of the total) were permanently occupied, while 552 apartments (57.4%) were seasonally occupied and 18 apartments (1.9%) were empty. As of 2007, the construction rate of new housing units was 9.1 new units per 1000 residents.

The historical population is given in the following table:

year	population
1596	104
1801	537
1850	782
1880	1,206
1888	227
1900	212
1950	648
1990	854
2000	866

== Heritage sites of national significance ==
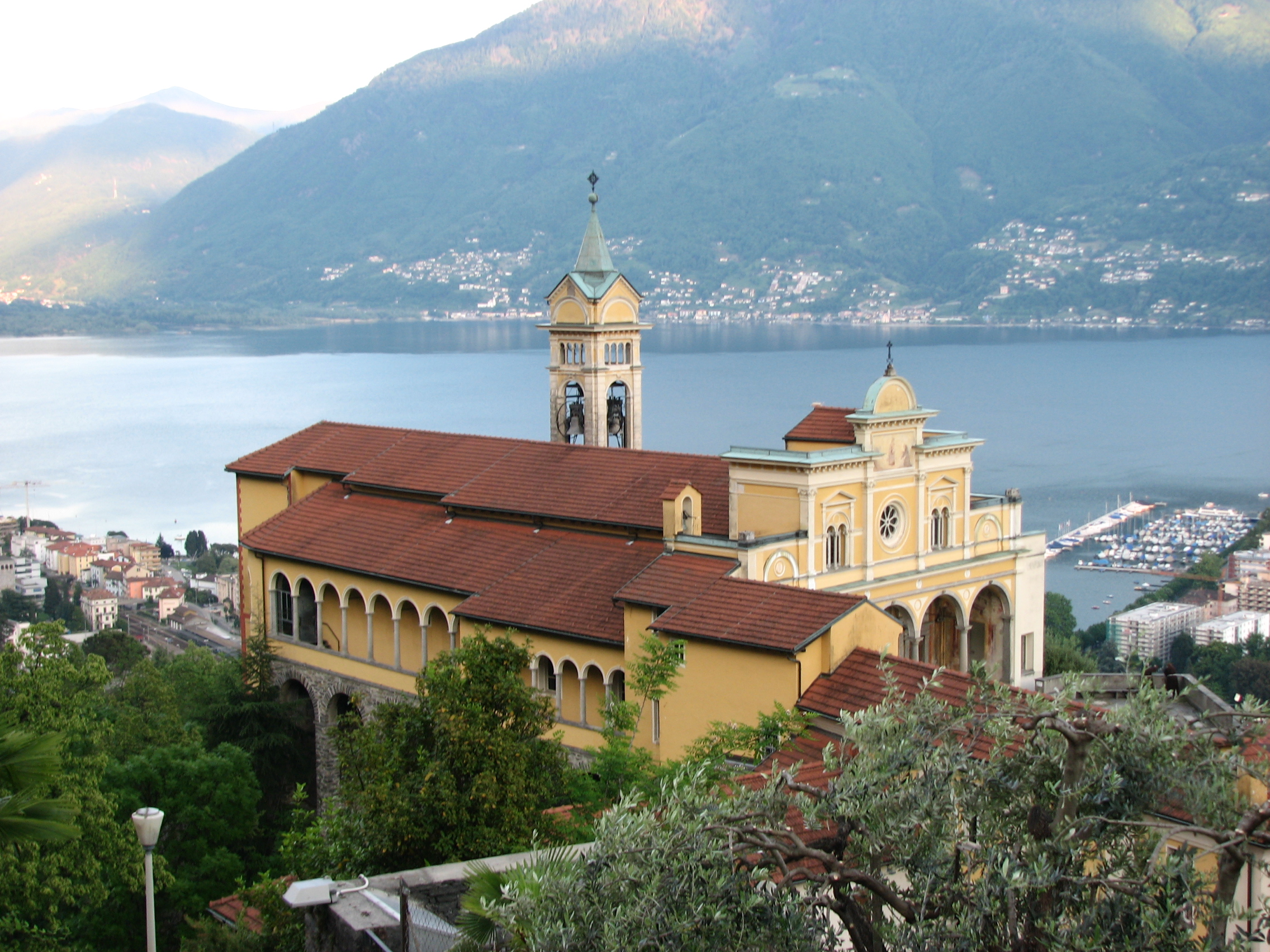
Convent and church of Madonna del Sasso

The Sacro Monte with the church of Dell’Annunziata and the convent and church of Della Madonna del Sasso e Museo is listed as a Swiss heritage site of national significance.

== Politics ==
In the 2007 federal election the most popular party was the FDP which received 35.82% of the vote. The next three most popular parties were the CVP (22.43%), the SP (18.51%) and the SVP (13.5%). In the federal election, a total of 243 votes were cast, and the voter turnout was 43.5%.

In the 2007 Gran Consiglio election, there were a total of 570 registered voters in Orselina, of which 272 or 47.7% voted. 5 blank ballots were cast, leaving 267 valid ballots in the election. The most popular party was the PLRT which received 62 or 23.2% of the vote. The next three most popular parties were; the PPD+GenGiova (with 50 or 18.7%), the SSI (with 49 or 18.4%) and the PS (with 38 or 14.2%).

In the 2007 Consiglio di Stato election, 3 blank ballots and 3 null ballots were cast, leaving 266 valid ballots in the election. The most popular party was the PLRT which received 62 or 23.3% of the vote. The next three most popular parties were; the PPD (with 56 or 21.1%), the SSI (with 46 or 17.3%) and the PS (with 45 or 16.9%).

== Economy ==
As of 2007, Orselina had an unemployment rate of 2.82%. As of 2005, there was 1 person employed in the primary economic sector and about 1 business involved in this sector. 4 people were employed in the secondary sector and there were 3 businesses in this sector. 439 people were employed in the tertiary sector, with 35 businesses in this sector. There were 366 residents of the municipality who were employed in some capacity, of which females made up 46.7% of the workforce.

In 2000, there were 371 workers who commuted into the municipality and 225 workers who commuted away. The municipality is a net importer of workers, with about 1.6 workers entering the municipality for every one leaving. About 9.7% of the workforce coming into Orselina are coming from outside Switzerland. Of the working population, 6% used public transportation to get to work, and 50.5% used a private car. As of 2009, there were 2 hotels in Orselina.

== Religion ==
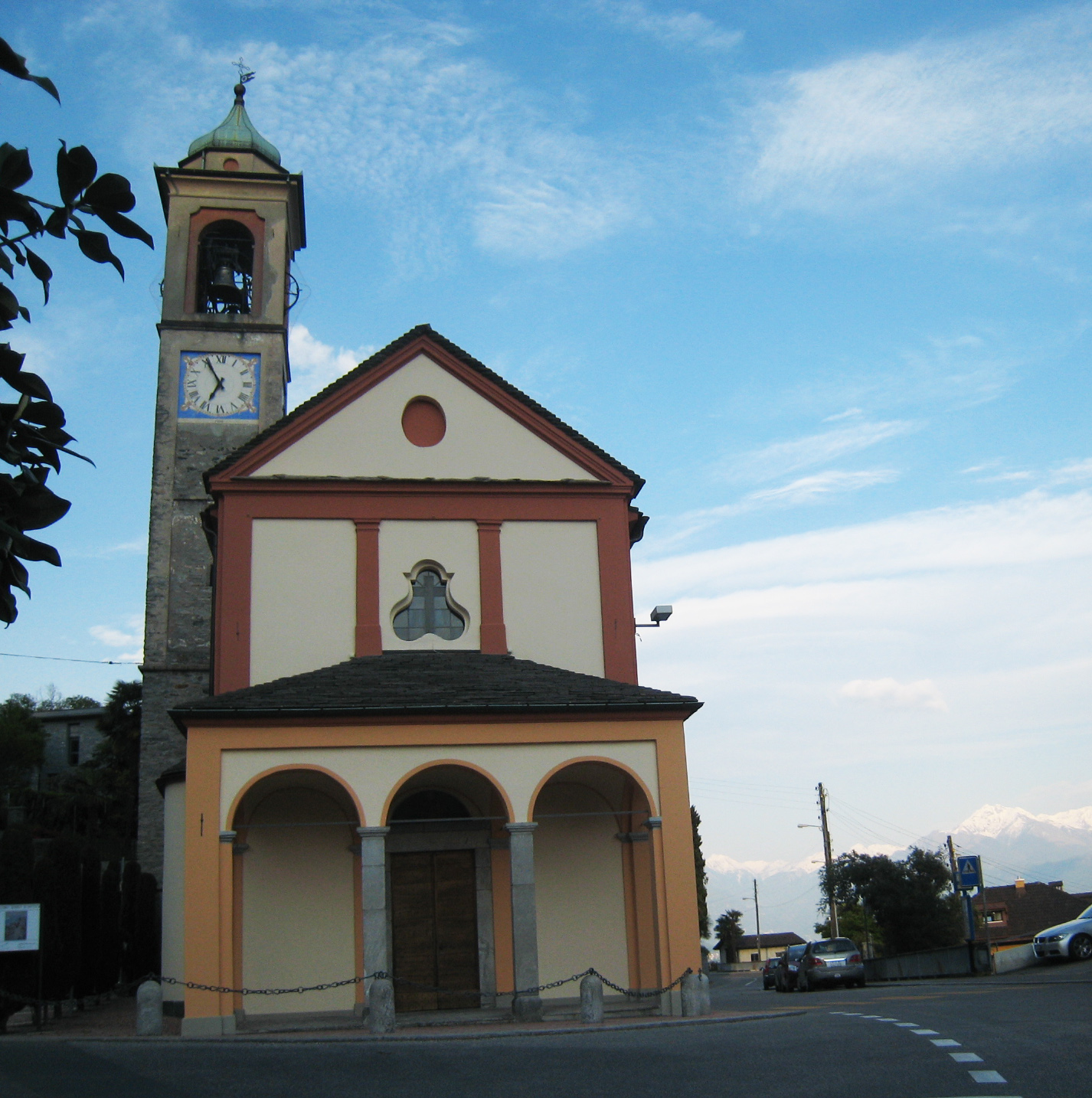
Church of Orselina

From the 2000 census, 536 or 61.9% were Roman Catholic, while 195 or 22.5% belonged to the Swiss Reformed Church. There are 115 individuals (or about 13.28% of the population) who belong to another church (not listed on the census), and 20 individuals (or about 2.31% of the population) did not answer the question.

== Education ==
In Orselina about 80.1% of the population (between age 25-64) have completed either non-mandatory upper secondary education or additional higher education (either university or a Fachhochschule).

In Orselina there was a total of 82 students (as of 2009). The Ticino education system provides up to three years of non-mandatory kindergarten and in Orselina there were 8 children in kindergarten. The primary school program lasts for five years and includes both a standard school and a special school. In the village, 30 students attended the standard primary schools and 1 student attended the special school. In the lower secondary school system, students either attend a two-year middle school followed by a two-year pre-apprenticeship or they attend a four-year program to prepare for higher education. There were 23 students in the two-year middle school and 2 in their pre-apprenticeship, while 7 students were in the four-year advanced program.

The upper secondary school includes several options, but at the end of the upper secondary program, a student should be prepared to enter a trade or to continue to a university or college. In Ticino, vocational students may either attend school while working on their internship or apprenticeship (which takes three or four years) or may attend school followed by an internship or apprenticeship (which takes one year as a full-time student or one and a half to two years as a part-time student). In 2010, 7 vocational students were attending school full-time and 3 who attend part-time.

The professional program lasts three years and prepares a student for a job in engineering, nursing, computer science, business, tourism and similar fields. There was 1 student in the professional program.

As of 2000, there were 6 students in Orselina who came from another municipality, while 71 residents attended schools outside the municipality.

== Notable people ==
- Ottorino Volonterio (1917–2003) a racing driver
