= Mergoscia =

- Municipality
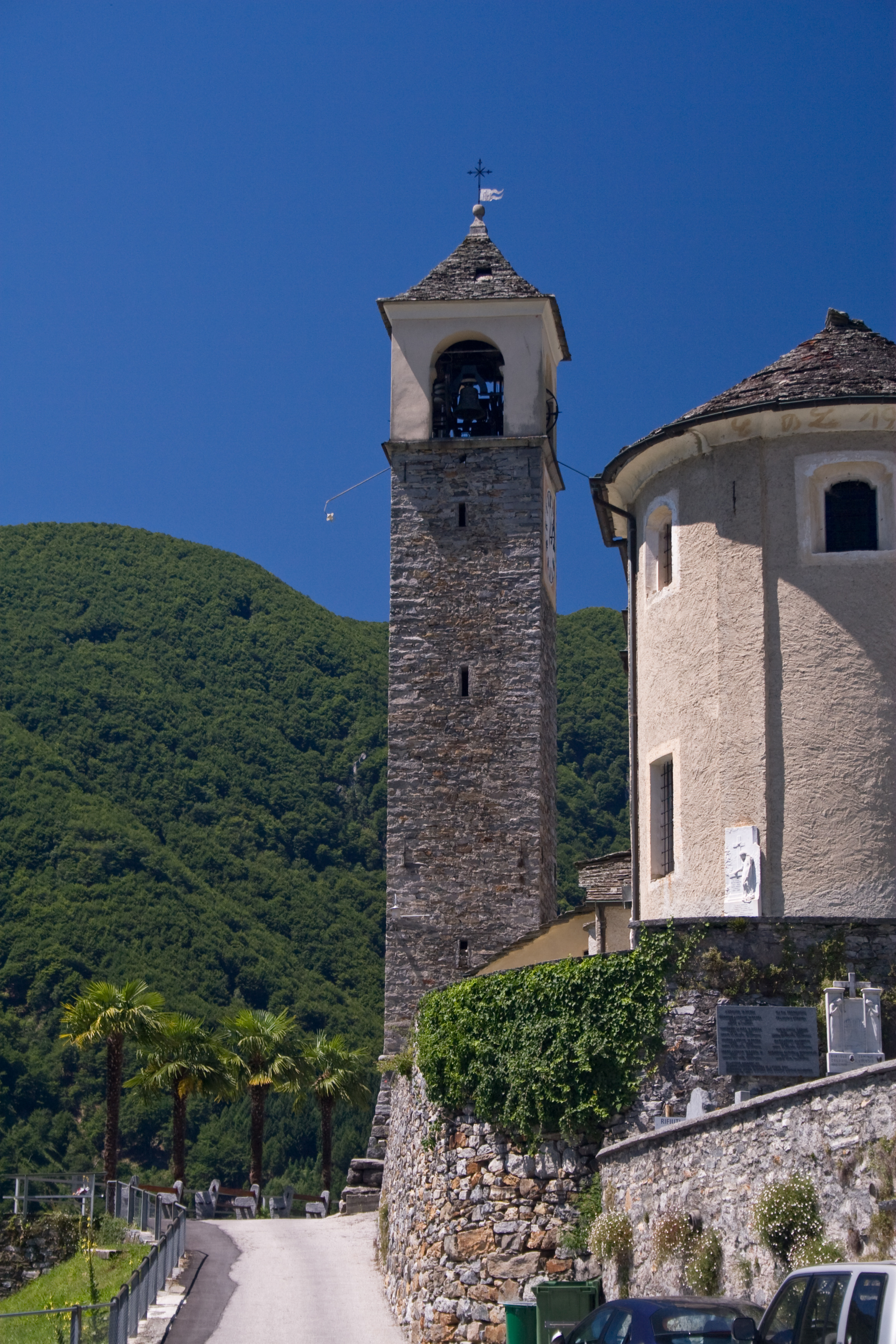

- Flag Coat of arms
- Location of Mergoscia
- Location within Switzerland Location within Canton of Ticino
- Coordinates: 46°13′N 8°51′E
- Country: Switzerland
- Canton: Ticino
- District: Locarno

Government
  - Mayor: Sindaco

Area
  - Total: 12.14 km^{2} (4.69 sq mi)
- Elevation: 735 m (2,411 ft)

Population (December 2004)
  - Total: 185
  - Density: 15.2/km^{2} (39.5/sq mi)
- Time zone: UTC+01:00 (CET)
  - Summer (DST): UTC+02:00 (CEST)
- Postal code: 6647
- SFOS number: 5117
- ISO 3166 code: CH-TI
- Surrounded by: Avegno, Brione sopra Minusio, Corippo, Gordevio, Gordola, Tenero-Contra, Vogorno
- Website: www.mergoscia.ch

Mergoscia is a municipality in the district of Locarno in the canton of Ticino in Switzerland.

== History ==
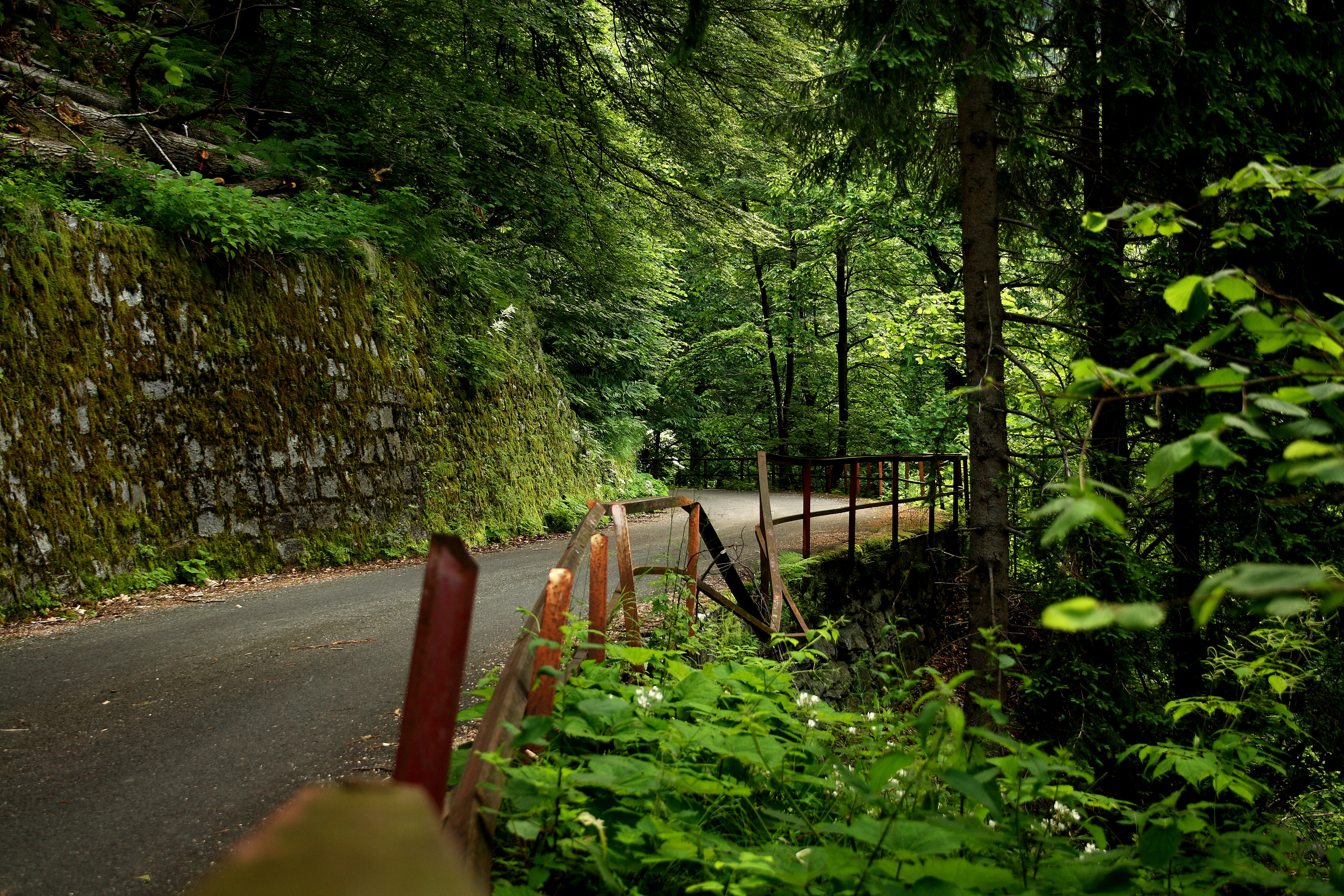
Old road to Mergoscia, built in 1900

Mergoscia is first mentioned in 1061 as Mergossia, though this comes from a copy of the original from 1402. In 1300 it was mentioned as Mergosia. In 1313, Mergoscia split from the Vicinanza of Minusio and Brione. However, the majority of the common property of the former vicinanza remained undivided until 1952. To avoid paying a tithe to the nobles of Locarno, at the beginning of the 15th century, the village split from Locarno to join the valley community of Verzasca and Valle Maggia.

The village church, split away from the mother church of Locarno, S. Vittore in Muralto, in 1591. The parish church of San Gottardo was built in 1597, over the foundation of a church that was first mentioned in 1338. The bell tower dates from 1697.

Most of the villagers worked as farmers, shepherds or cattle herders. Already in the Middle Ages they had a seasonal migration between the alpine pastures and the winter pastures in the Magadino valley. Until 1920 they shared grazing rights with Minusio and Locarno and owned part of the shared Terricciole territory. The scarce economic resources forced many villagers to emigrate oversees, starting in the 15th century and running until the 19th century. In 1900 the old road was built to the village. The tunnel of Mergoscia was built in 1997–98. With easier access to the village, many of the houses became vacation homes.

== Geography ==
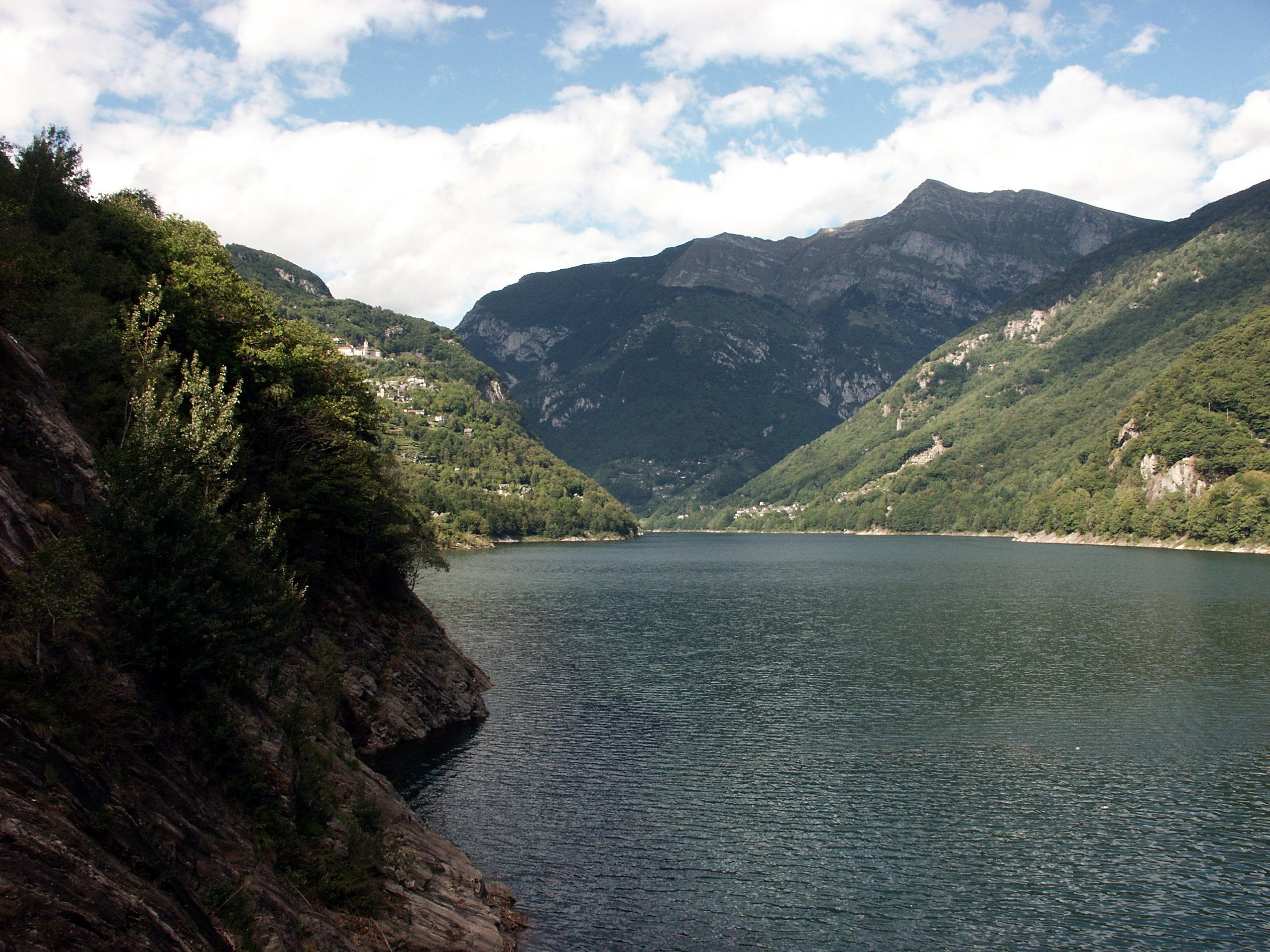
Il Lago di Vogorno

Aerial view (1946)

Mergoscia has an area, as of 1997, of 12.14 square kilometers (4.69 sq mi). Of this area, 0.42 km^{2} (0.16 sq mi) or 3.5% is used for agricultural purposes, while 8.17 km^{2} (3.15 sq mi) or 67.3% is forested. Of the rest of the land, 0.31 km^{2} (0.12 sq mi) or 2.6% is settled (buildings or roads), 0.63 km^{2} (0.24 sq mi) or 5.2% is either rivers or lakes and 1.25 km^{2} (0.48 sq mi) or 10.3% is unproductive land.

Of the built up area, housing and buildings made up 1.7% and transportation infrastructure made up 0.7%. Out of the forested land, 53.9% of the total land area is heavily forested, while 10.7% is covered in small trees and shrubbery and 2.7% is covered with orchards or small clusters of trees. Of the agricultural land, 1.0% is used for growing crops and 1.7% is used for alpine pastures. Of the water in the municipality, 4.6% is in lakes and 0.6% is in rivers and streams. Of the unproductive areas, 8.7% is unproductive vegetation and 1.6% is too rocky for vegetation.

The municipality is located in the Locarno district, above Lago di Vogorno in the Verzasca Valley.

== Demographics ==
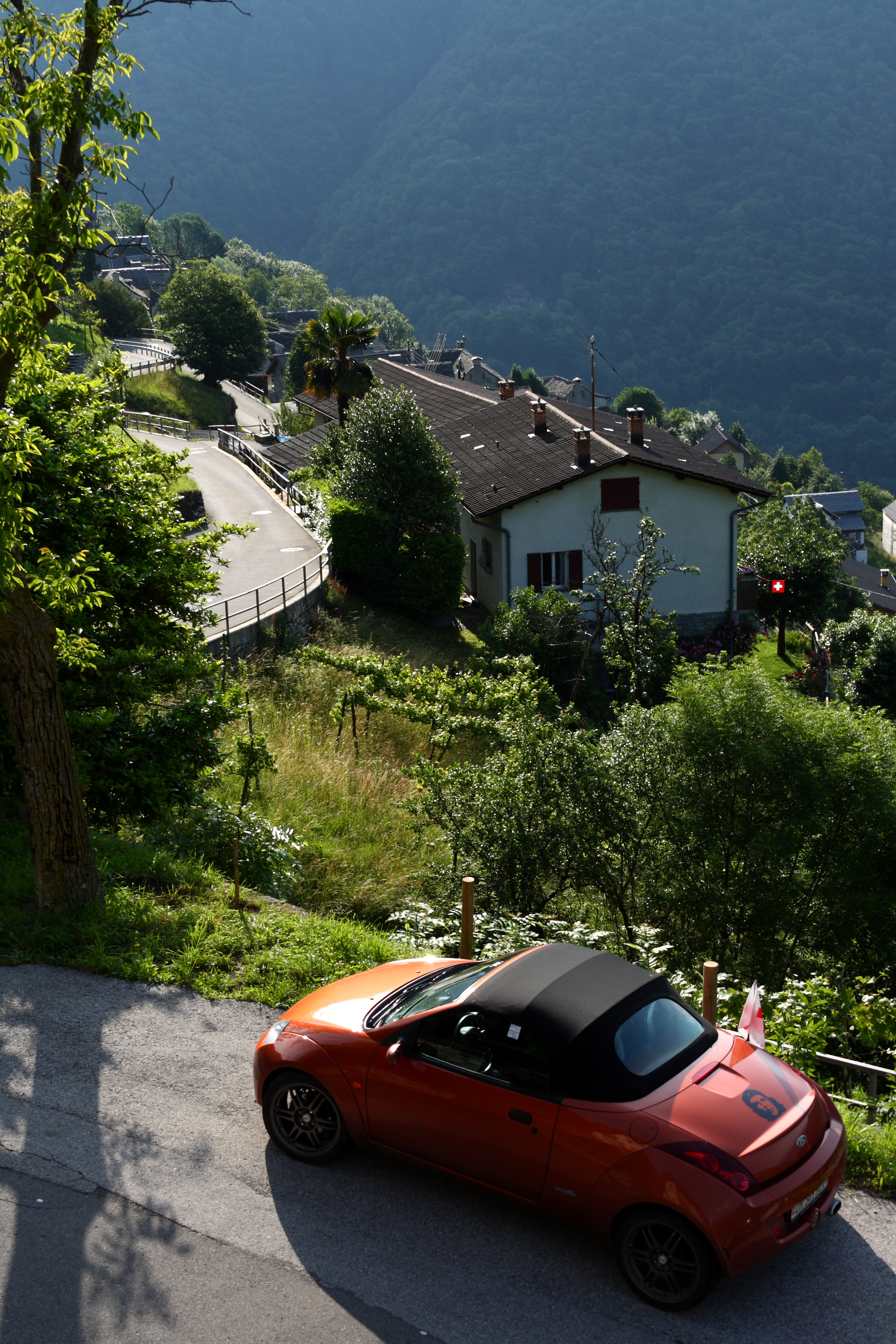
Mergoscia with some of the newer houses in the village

Mergoscia has a population (as of December 2020) of 201. As of 2008, 9.0% of the population are resident foreign nationals. Over the last 10 years (1997–2007) the population has changed at a rate of 19.9%.

Most of the population (as of 2000) speaks Italian (71.8%), with German being second most common (24.3%) and French being third (2.2%). Of the Swiss national languages (as of 2000), 44 speak German, 4 people speak French, 130 people speak Italian. The remainder (3 people) speak another language.

As of 2008, the gender distribution of the population was 50.0% male and 50.0% female. The population was made up of 96 Swiss men (44.0% of the population), and 13 (6.0%) non-Swiss men. There were 104 Swiss women (47.7%), and 5 (2.3%) non-Swiss women.

In 2008 there were 5 live births to Swiss citizens and 1 death of a Swiss citizen. Ignoring immigration and emigration, the population of Swiss citizens increased by 4 while the foreign population remained the same. There were 4 non-Swiss men who immigrated from another country to Switzerland. The total Swiss population change in 2008 (from all sources, including moves across municipal borders) was an increase of 11 and the non-Swiss population change was an increase of 7 people. This represents a population growth rate of 8.8%.

The age distribution, as of 2009, in Mergoscia is; 19 children or 8.7% of the population are between 0 and 9 years old and 24 teenagers or 11.0% are between 10 and 19. Of the adult population, 13 people or 6.0% of the population are between 20 and 29 years old. 20 people or 9.2% are between 30 and 39, 48 people or 22.0% are between 40 and 49, and 30 people or 13.8% are between 50 and 59. The senior population distribution is 35 people or 16.1% of the population are between 60 and 69 years old, 15 people or 6.9% are between 70 and 79, there are 14 people or 6.4% who are over 80.

As of 2000, there were 84 private households in the municipality, and an average of 2.1 persons per household. In 2000 there were 395 single family homes (or 95.2% of the total) out of a total of 415 inhabited buildings. There were 10 two family buildings (2.4%) and 2 multi-family buildings (0.5%). There were also 8 buildings in the municipality that were multipurpose buildings (used for both housing and commercial or another purpose).

The vacancy rate for the municipality, in 2008, was 0%. In 2000 there were 428 apartments in the municipality. The most common apartment size was the 3 room apartment of which there were 132. There were 36 single room apartments and 44 apartments with five or more rooms. Of these apartments, a total of 84 apartments (19.6% of the total) were permanently occupied, while 344 apartments (80.4%) were seasonally occupied. As of 2007, the construction rate of new housing units was 0 new units per 1000 residents.

The historical population is given in the following table:

| year | population |
|---|---|
| 1596 | 316 |
| 1790 | 752 |
| 1850 | 588 |
| 1900 | 351 |
| 1950 | 197 |
| 1990 | 133 |
| 2000 | 181 |

== Politics ==
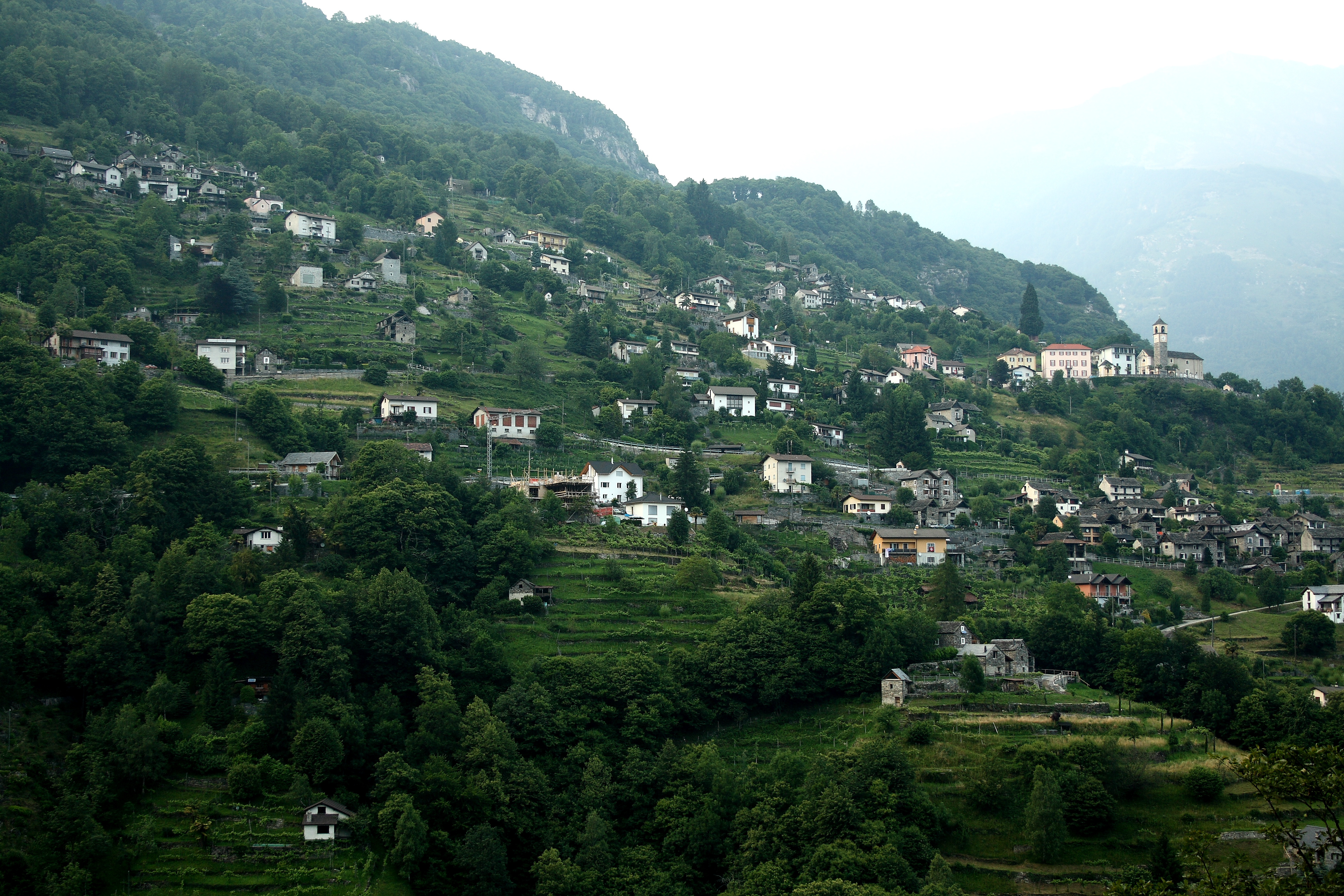
View of Mergoscia

In the 2007 federal election the most popular party was the FDP which received 36.43% of the vote. The next three most popular parties were the SP (30.09%), the Green Party (11.54%) and the Ticino League (5.88%). In the federal election, a total of 56 votes were cast, and the voter turnout was 35.9%.

In the 2007 Gran Consiglio election, there were a total of 154 registered voters in Mergoscia, of which 84 or 54.5% voted. 3 blank ballots and 1 null ballot were cast, leaving 80 valid ballots in the election. The most popular party was the PS which received 24 or 30.0% of the vote. The next three most popular parties were; the PLRT (with 19 or 23.8%), the SSI (with 17 or 21.3%) and the Greens (with 11 or 13.8%).

In the 2007 Consiglio di Stato election, 2 blank ballots were cast, leaving 82 valid ballots in the election. The most popular party was the PS which received 28 or 34.1% of the vote. The next three most popular parties were; the PLRT (with 15 or 18.3%), the LEGA (with 14 or 17.1%) and the SSI (with 13 or 15.9%).

== Economy ==
As of 2007, Mergoscia had an unemployment rate of 2.67%. As of 2005, there were 18 people employed in the primary economic sector and about 6 businesses involved in this sector. 2 people were employed in the secondary sector and there were 2 businesses in this sector. 8 people were employed in the tertiary sector, with 3 businesses in this sector. There were 72 residents of the municipality who were employed in some capacity, of which females made up 34.7% of the workforce.

In 2000, there were 43 workers who commuted away from the municipality. Of the working population, 4.2% used public transportation to get to work, and 55.6% used a private car.

== Religion ==
From the 2000 census, 129 or 71.3% were Roman Catholic, while 25 or 13.8% belonged to the Swiss Reformed Church. There are 20 individuals (or about 11.05% of the population) who belong to another church (not listed on the census), and 7 individuals (or about 3.87% of the population) did not answer the question.

== Education ==
In Mergoscia about 78.1% of the population (between age 25 and 64) have completed either non-mandatory upper secondary education or additional higher education (either university or a Fachhochschule).

In Mergoscia there were a total of 36 students (as of 2009). The Ticino education system provides up to three years of non-mandatory kindergarten and in Mergoscia there were 6 children in kindergarten. The primary school program lasts for five years. In the village, 11 students attended the standard primary schools. In the lower secondary school system, students either attend a two-year middle school followed by a two-year pre-apprenticeship or they attend a four-year program to prepare for higher education. There were 15 students in the two-year middle school, while 2 students were in the four-year advanced program.

The upper secondary school includes several options, but at the end of the upper secondary program, a student will be prepared to enter a trade or to continue on to a university or college. In Ticino, vocational students may either attend school while working on their internship or apprenticeship (which takes three or four years) or may attend school followed by an internship or apprenticeship (which takes one year as a full-time student or one and a half to two years as a part-time student). There was 1 vocational student who was attending school full-time and 1 who attend part-time.

As of 2000, there were 17 students from Mergoscia who attended schools outside the municipality.
