= Giovanni Antonio Vanoni =

Swiss painter

Giovanni Antonio Vanoni (1810–1886) was a Swiss painter.

In 1857, Giovanni Antonio Vanoni and Giacomo Antonio Pedrazzi painted the Church of S. Vittore in Muralto.
