= Verzasca =

Verzasca may refer to:

- Valle Verzasca, valley in Switzerland
- Verzasca, river in Switzerland
  - Verzasca Dam, a dam on the Verzasca river
- Verzasca, municipality in Switzerland
