= Cima dell'Uomo (Italy) =

Mountain in Italy

- Cima Uomo
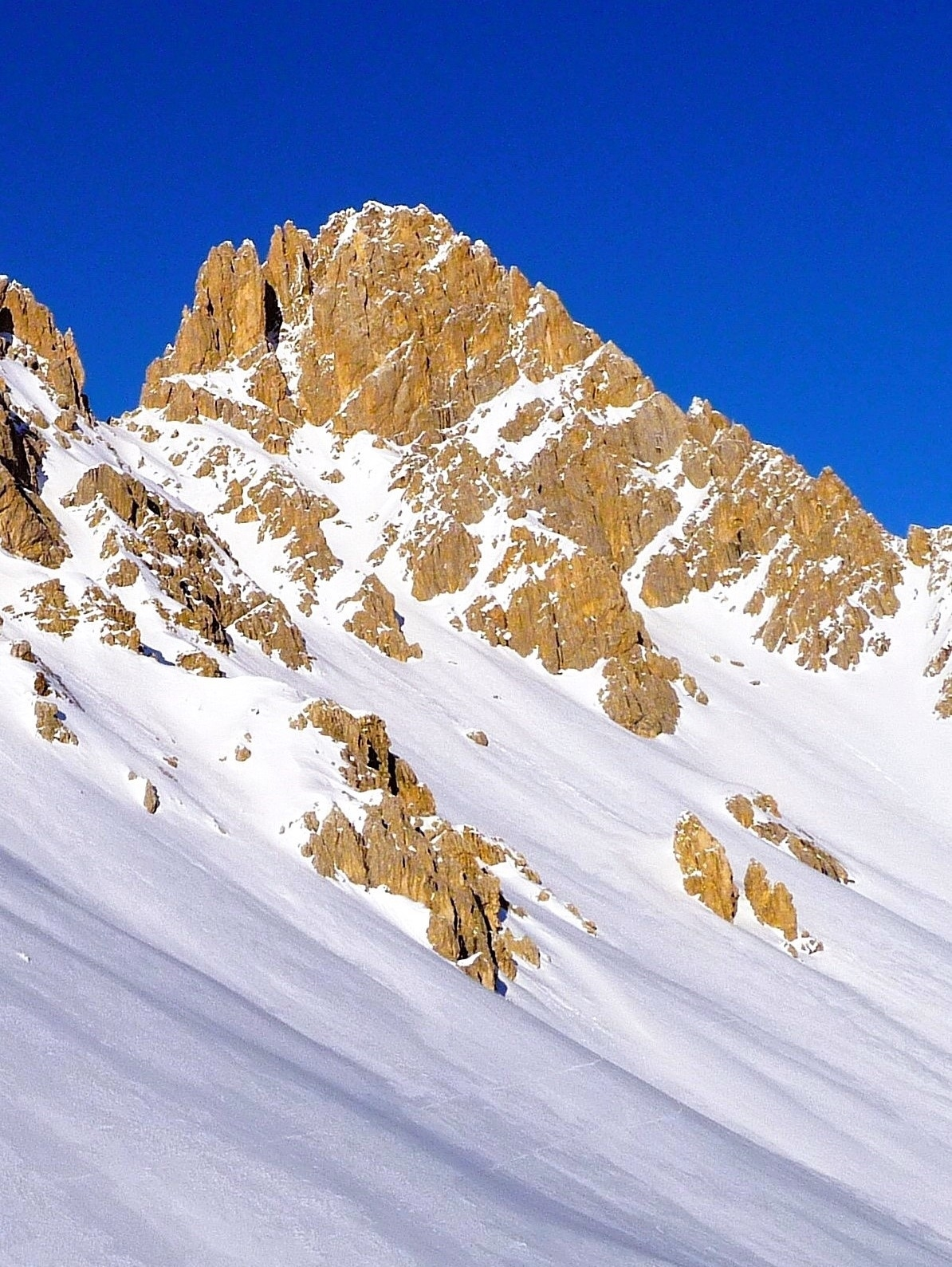
- Southwest aspect

Highest point
- Elevation: 3,010 m (9,875 ft)
- Prominence: 327 m (1,073 ft)
- Parent peak: Marmolada
- Isolation: 2.736 km (1.700 mi)
- Coordinates: 46°24′22″N 11°48′32″E

Geography
- Location within Italy
- Interactive map of Cima Uomo
- Country: Italy
- Province: Trentino
- Protected area: Dolomites World Heritage Site
- Parent range: Dolomites; Marmolada Group
- Topo map(s): Tabacco 07 Alta Badia, Arabba - Marmolada

Geology
- Rock age: Triassic
- Rock type: Dolomite

Climbing
- First ascent: 1879

Cima dell'Uomo is a mountain in the province of Trentino in northern Italy.

== Description ==
Cima dell'Uomo, also spelled Cima Uomo, is a 3,010-meter-elevation (9,875-foot) summit in the Dolomites, and as part of the Dolomites is a UNESCO World Heritage site. Set in the Trentino-Alto Adige/Südtirol region, the peak is located seven kilometers (4.35 miles) northwest of the municipality of Falcade. Precipitation runoff from the mountain's northwest slope drains to the Avisio, whereas the south and east slopes drain into tributaries of the Piave. Topographic relief is significant as the summit rises 1,060 meters (3,477 feet) above the San Nicolò Valley in 2.5 kilometers (1.55 miles), and 1,210 meters (3,970 ft) above Highway 346 in three kilometers (1.86 miles). The nearest higher neighbor is Sasso Vernale, 2.73 kilometers (1.7 miles) to the northeast. The first ascent of Cima Uomo was made on July 17, 1879, by Gottfried Merzbacher, Cesare Tomè, Battista Bernard, and Santo Siorpaes. The mountain's descriptive toponym translates as "Peak of the Man" and there are other Cima dell'Uomo summits in the Alps.

== Climate ==
Based on the Köppen climate classification, Cima dell'Uomo is located in an alpine climate zone with long, cold winters, and short, mild summers. Weather systems are forced upwards by the mountains (orographic lift), causing moisture to drop in the form of rain and snow. This climate supports the Trevalli Ski Area at San Pellegrino Pass below the peak. The months of June through September offer the most favorable weather for visiting or climbing in this area.

== Gallery ==
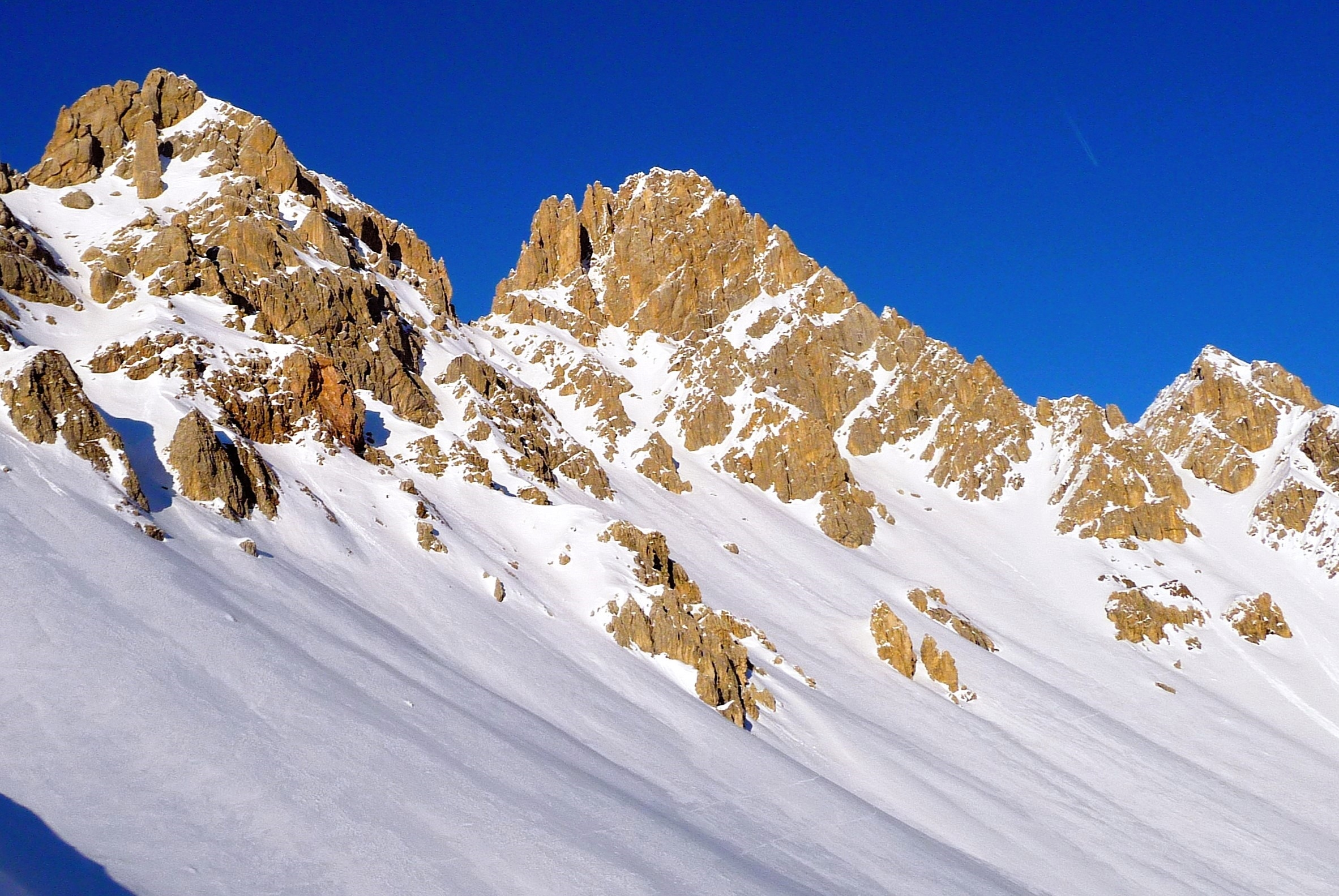
Southwest aspect centered, with Ponta del Ciadin (2,922 m) to left.
Viewed from the San Pellegrino Pass area.

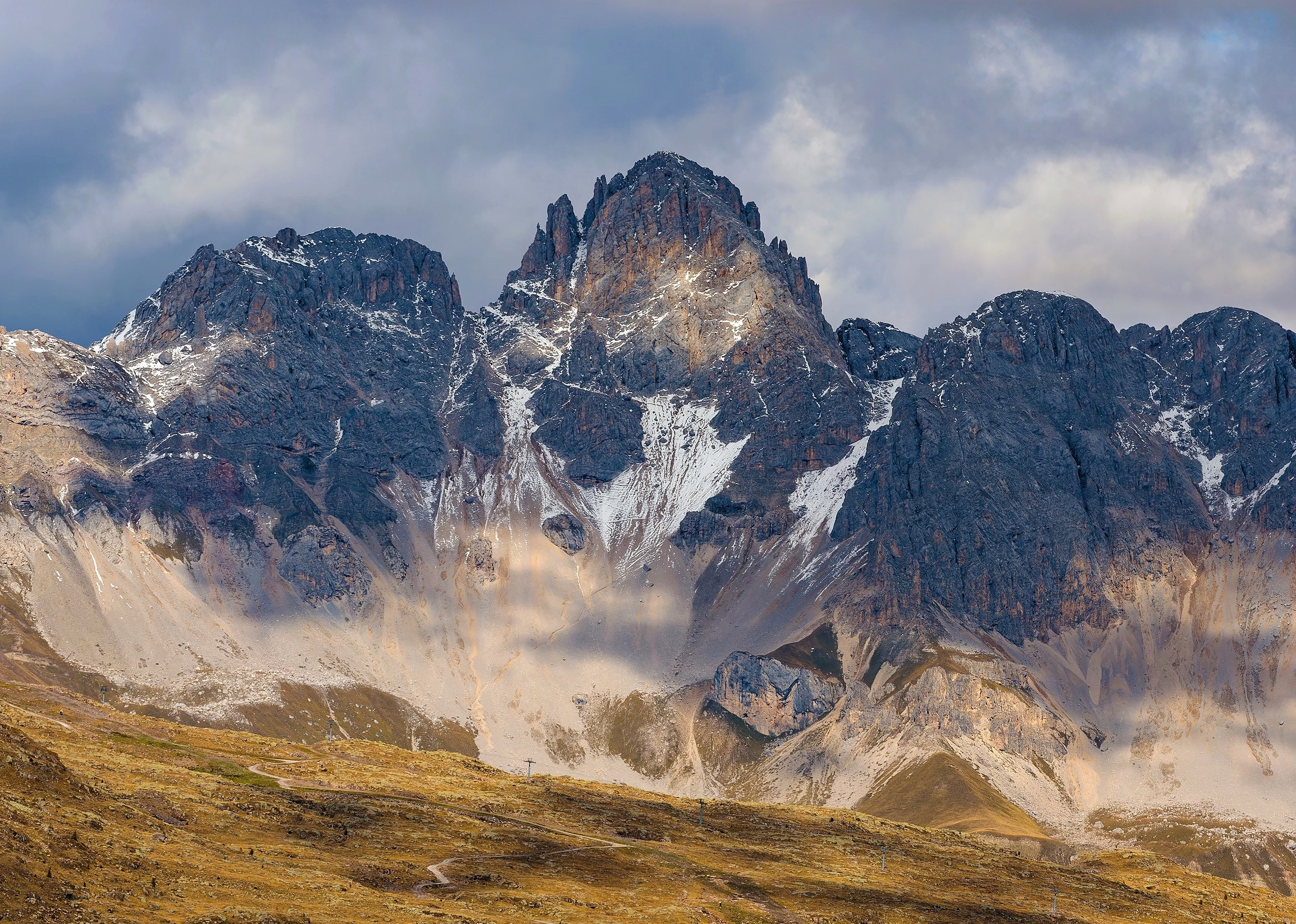
South aspect

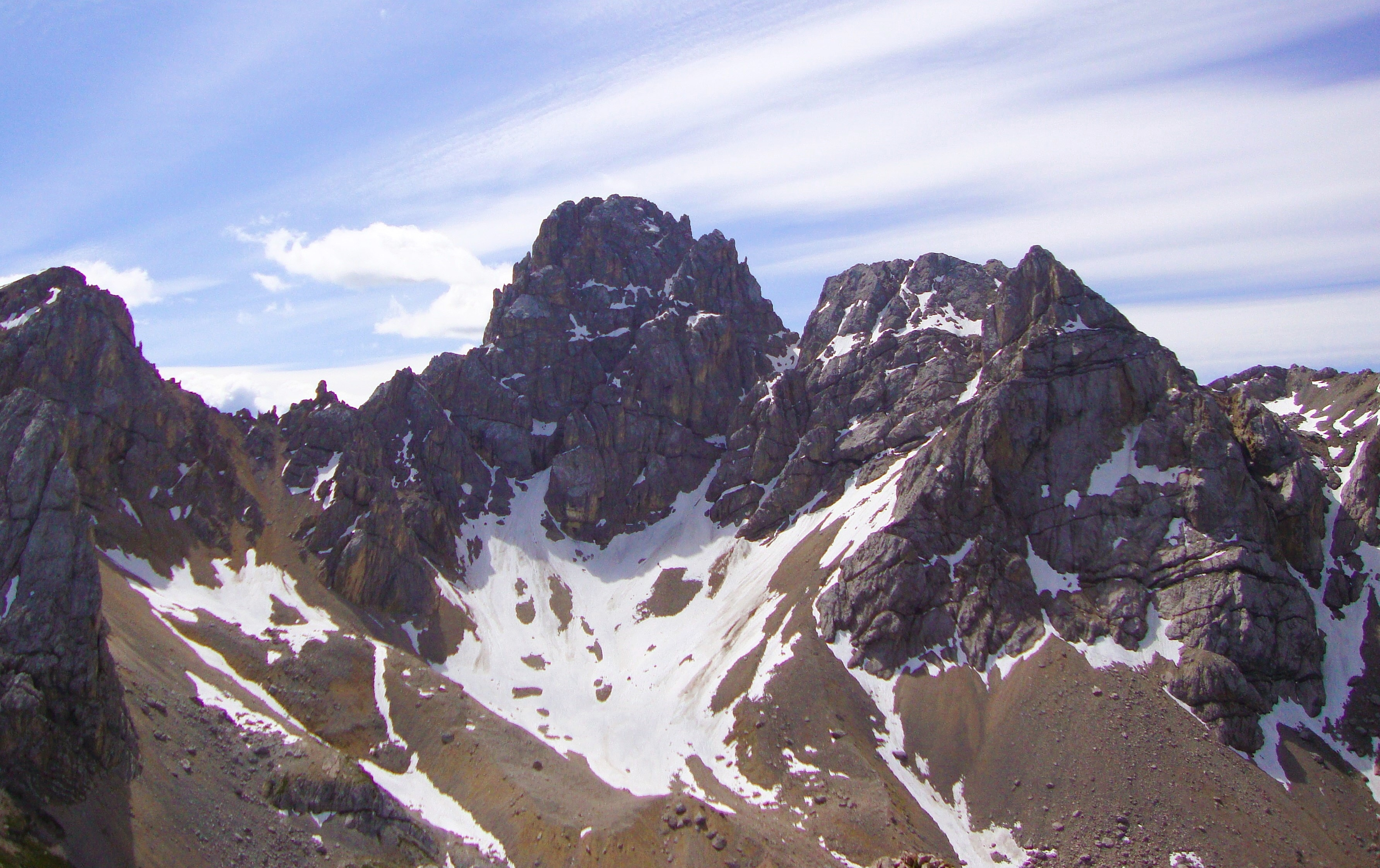
North aspect, viewed from Col Ombert

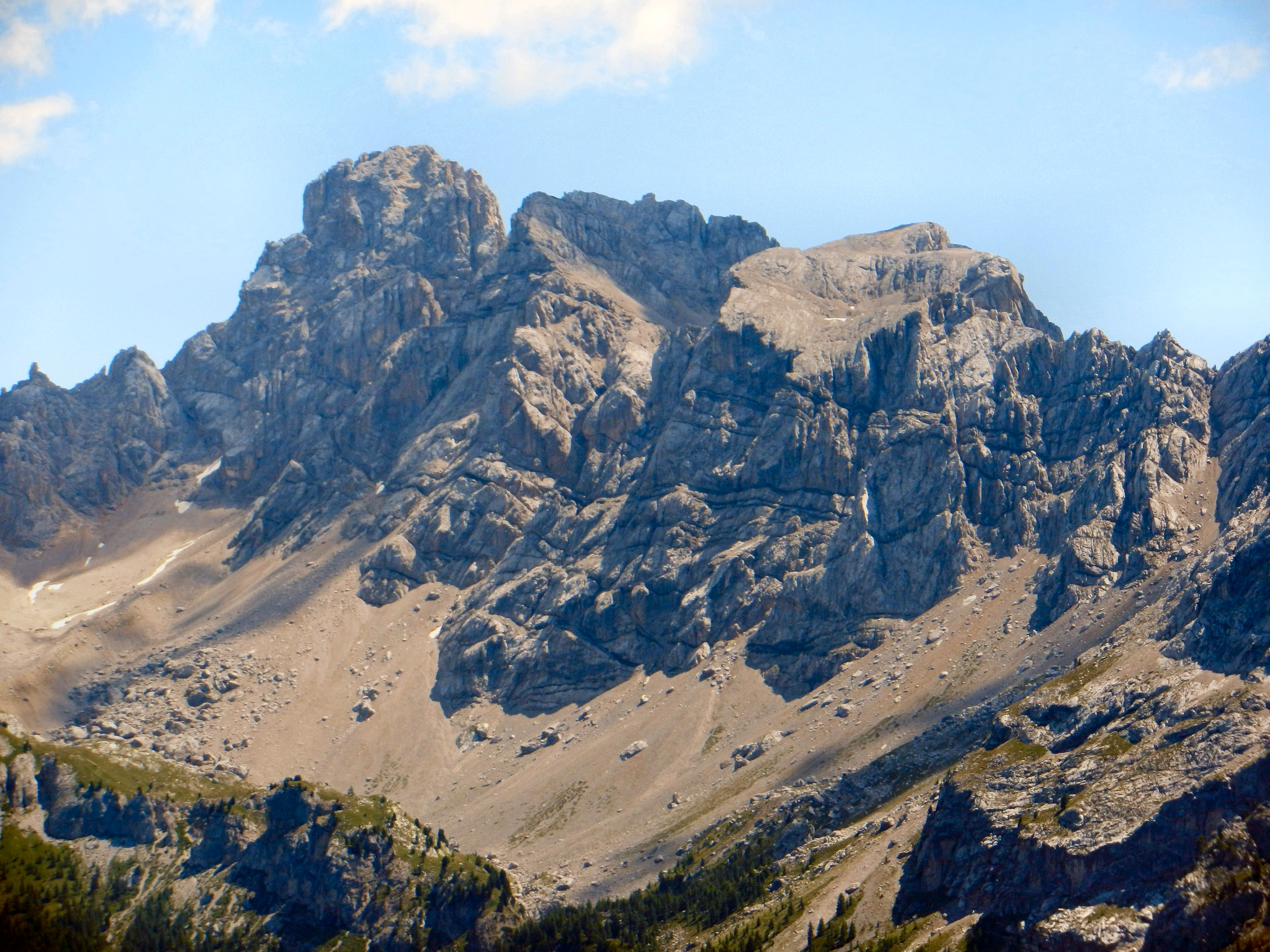
West-northwest aspect

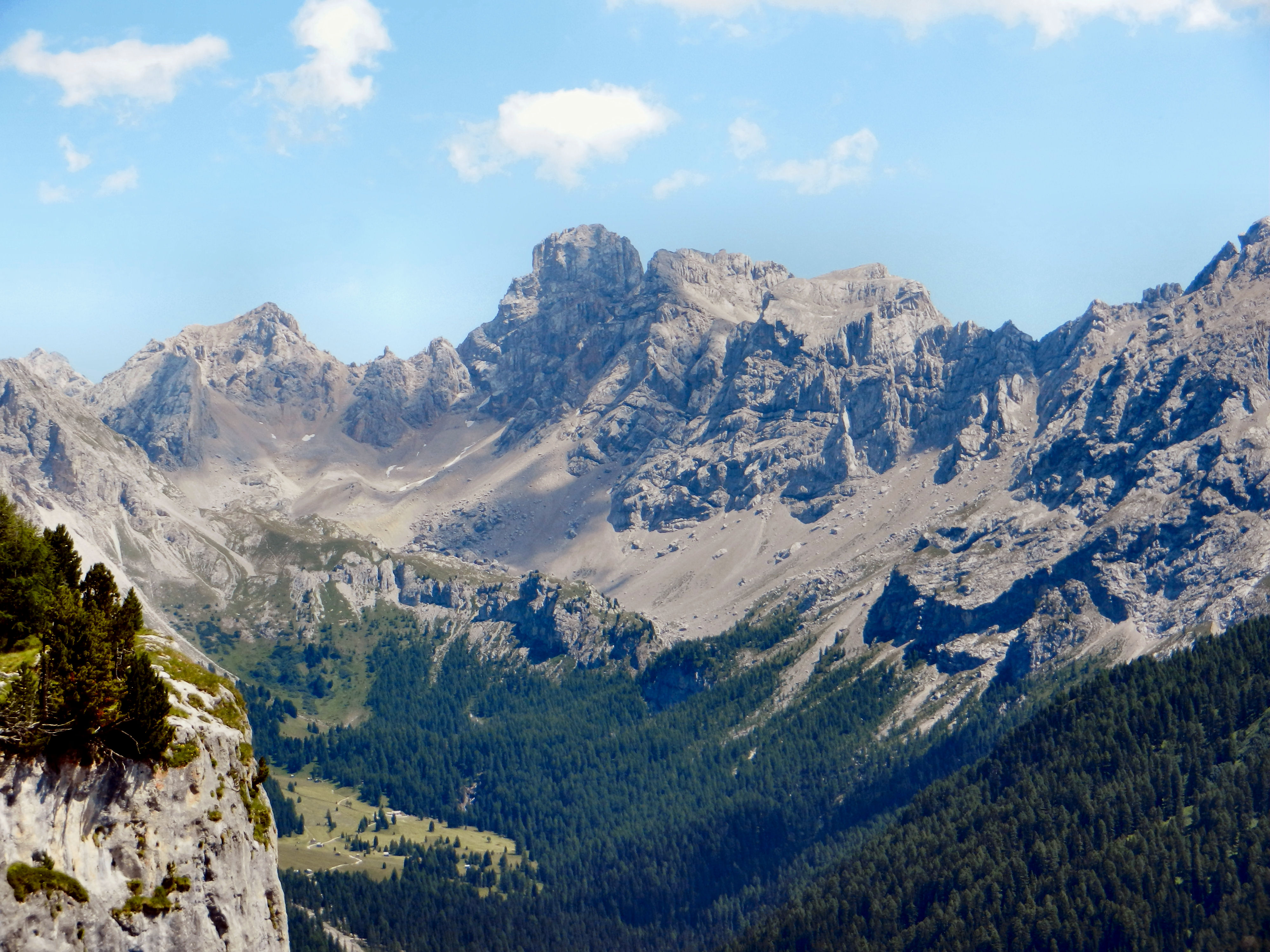
Cima Uomo rises above the San Nicolò Valley

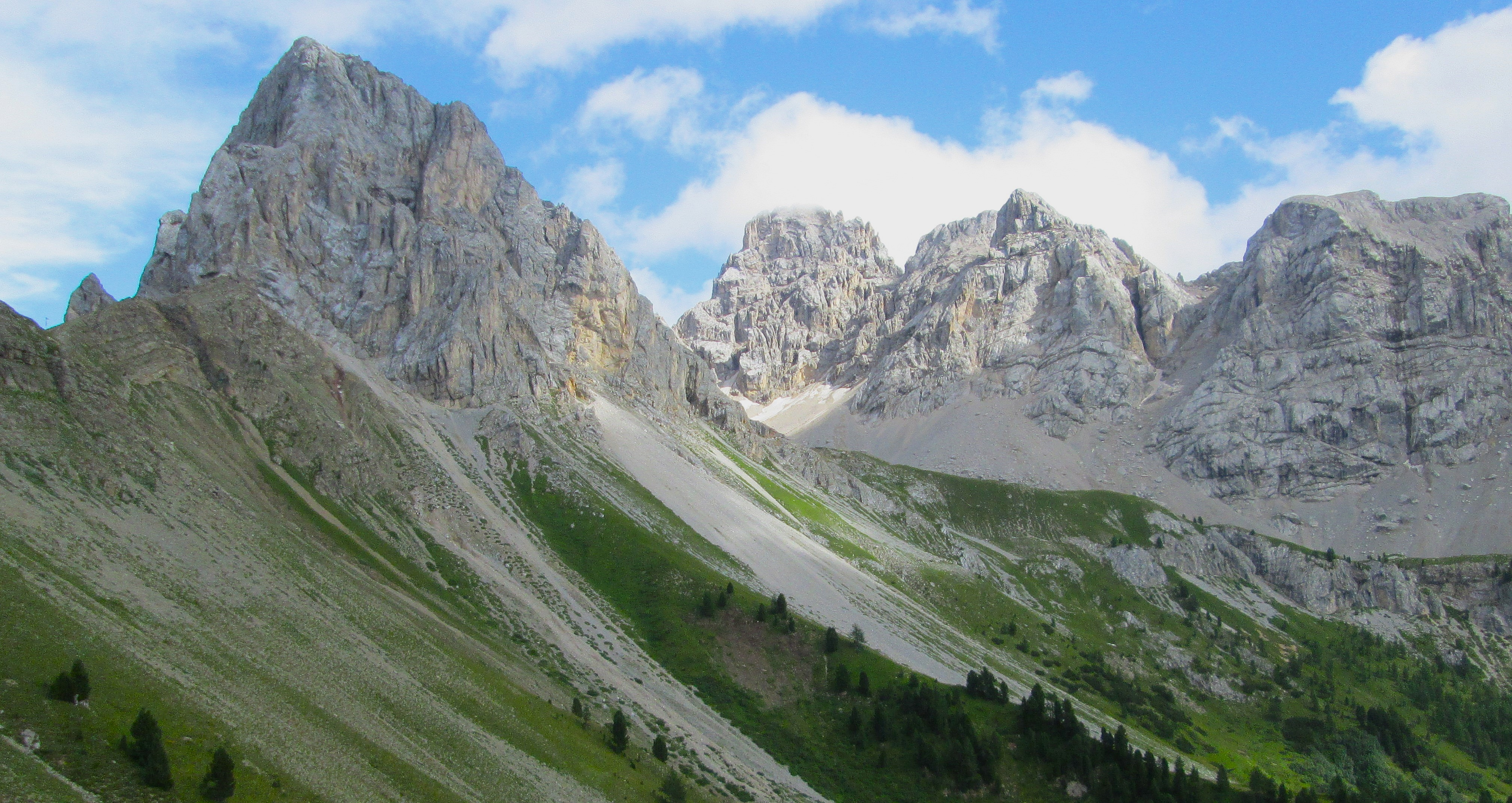
Northwest aspect of Cima Uomo centered on skyline

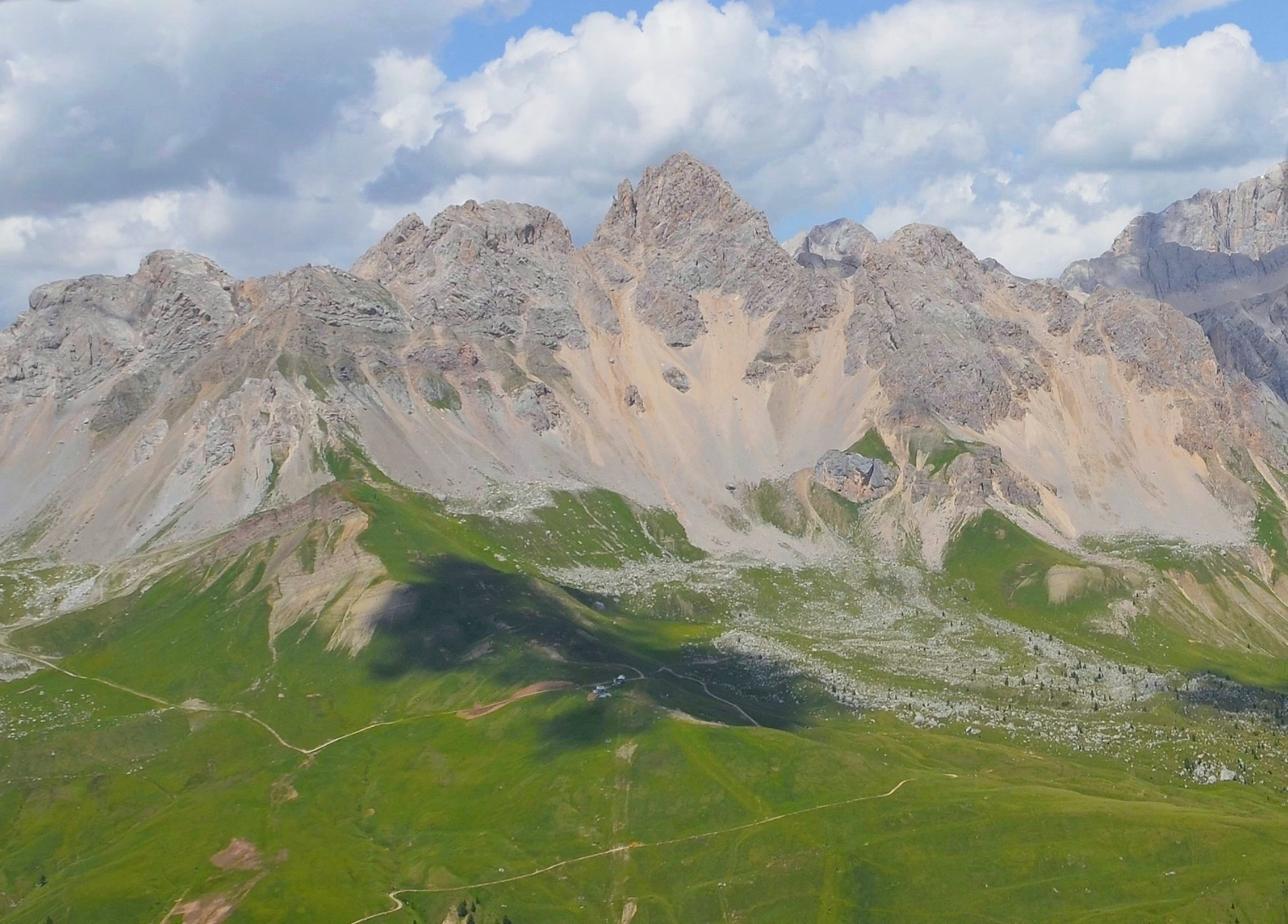
South aspect

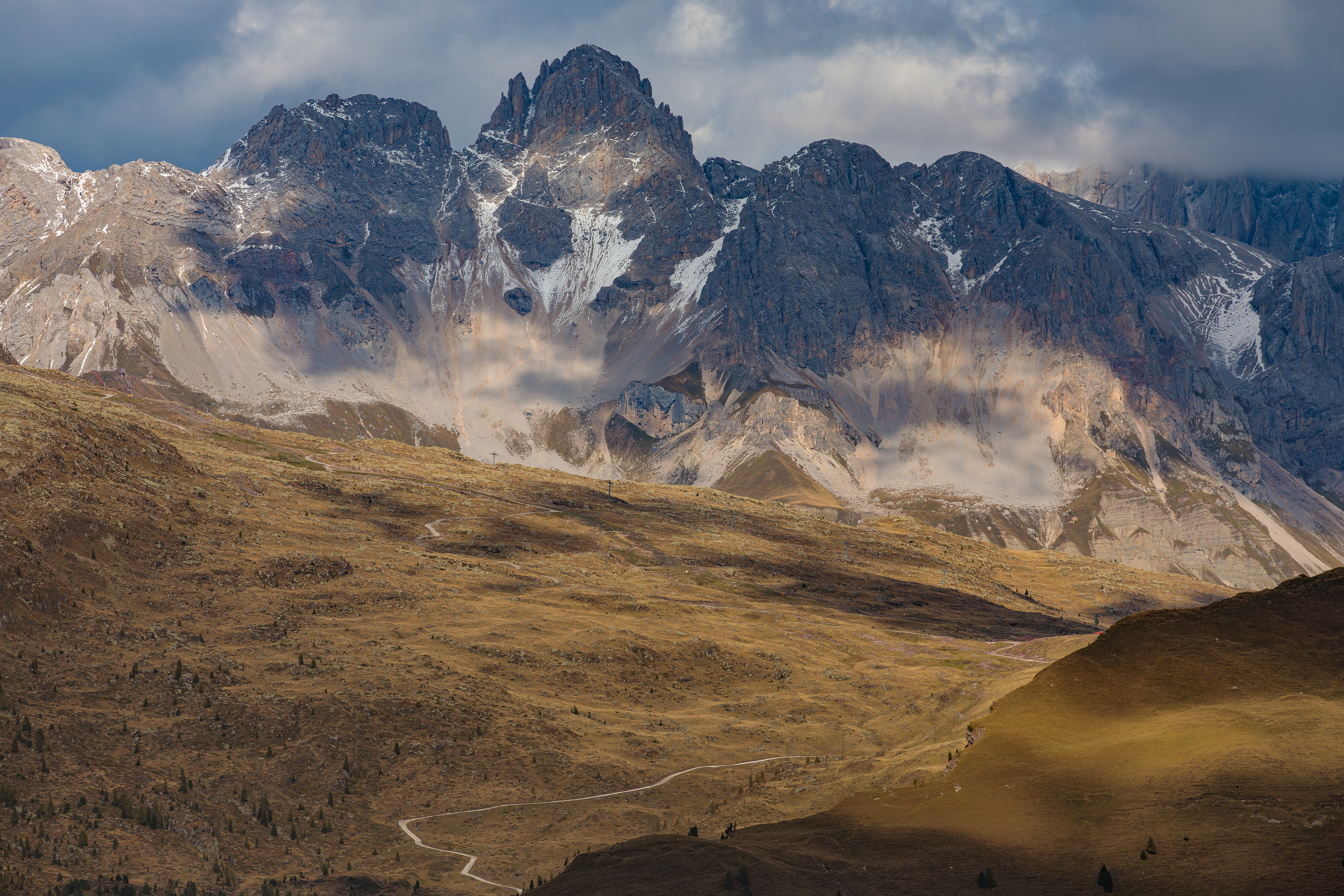
South aspect

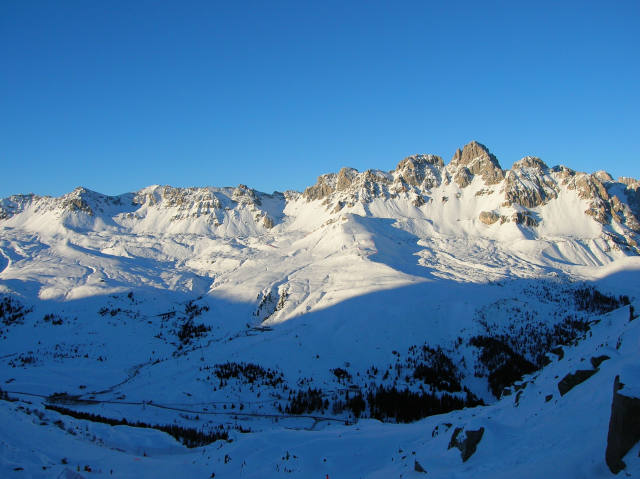
South aspect (right)

== See also ==
- Southern Limestone Alps
