= Lago di Vogorno =

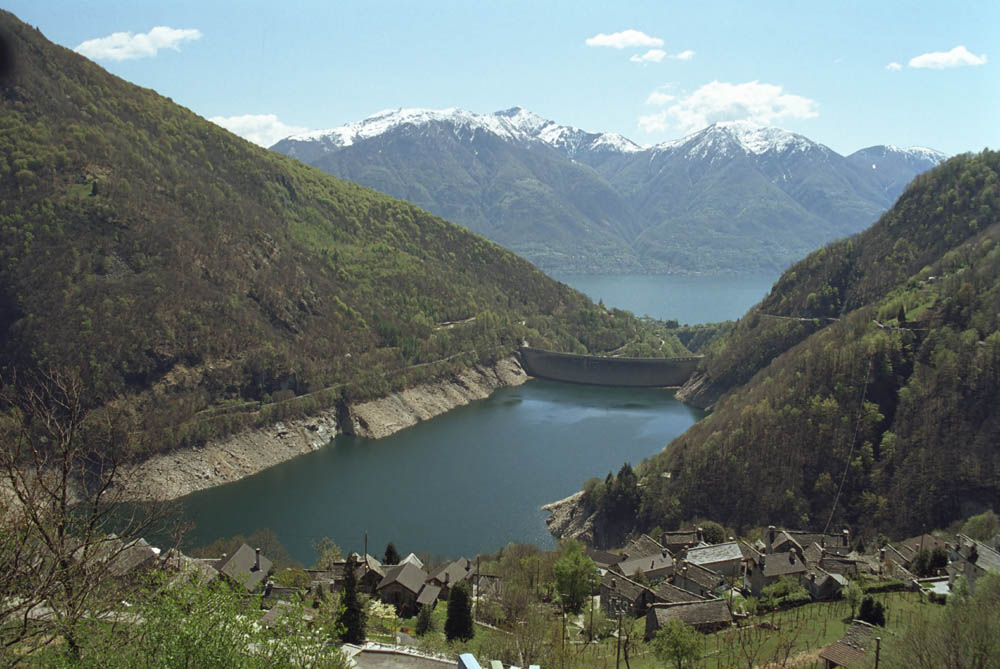

- Location within Canton of Ticino Location within Switzerland Location within Alps
- Interactive map of Lago di Vogorno
- Location: Ticino
- Coordinates: 46°12′N 8°51′E
- Type: reservoir
- Primary inflows: Verzasca
- Primary outflows: Verzasca
- Catchment area: 233 km^{2} (90 sq mi)
- Basin countries: Switzerland
- Surface area: 1.68 km^{2} (0.65 sq mi)
- Max. depth: 204 m (669 ft)
- Water volume: 105 million cubic metres (85,000 acre⋅ft)
- Surface elevation: 470 m (1,540 ft)

Lago di Vogorno is a reservoir near Tenero, in Ticino, Switzerland. The reservoir on the Verzasca river is formed by the Verzasca Dam, built 1961–1965. The water surface area is 1.68 km^{2} (0.65 sq mi).

== See also ==
- List of lakes of Switzerland
