= San Pellegrino Pass =

Mountain pass in Italy

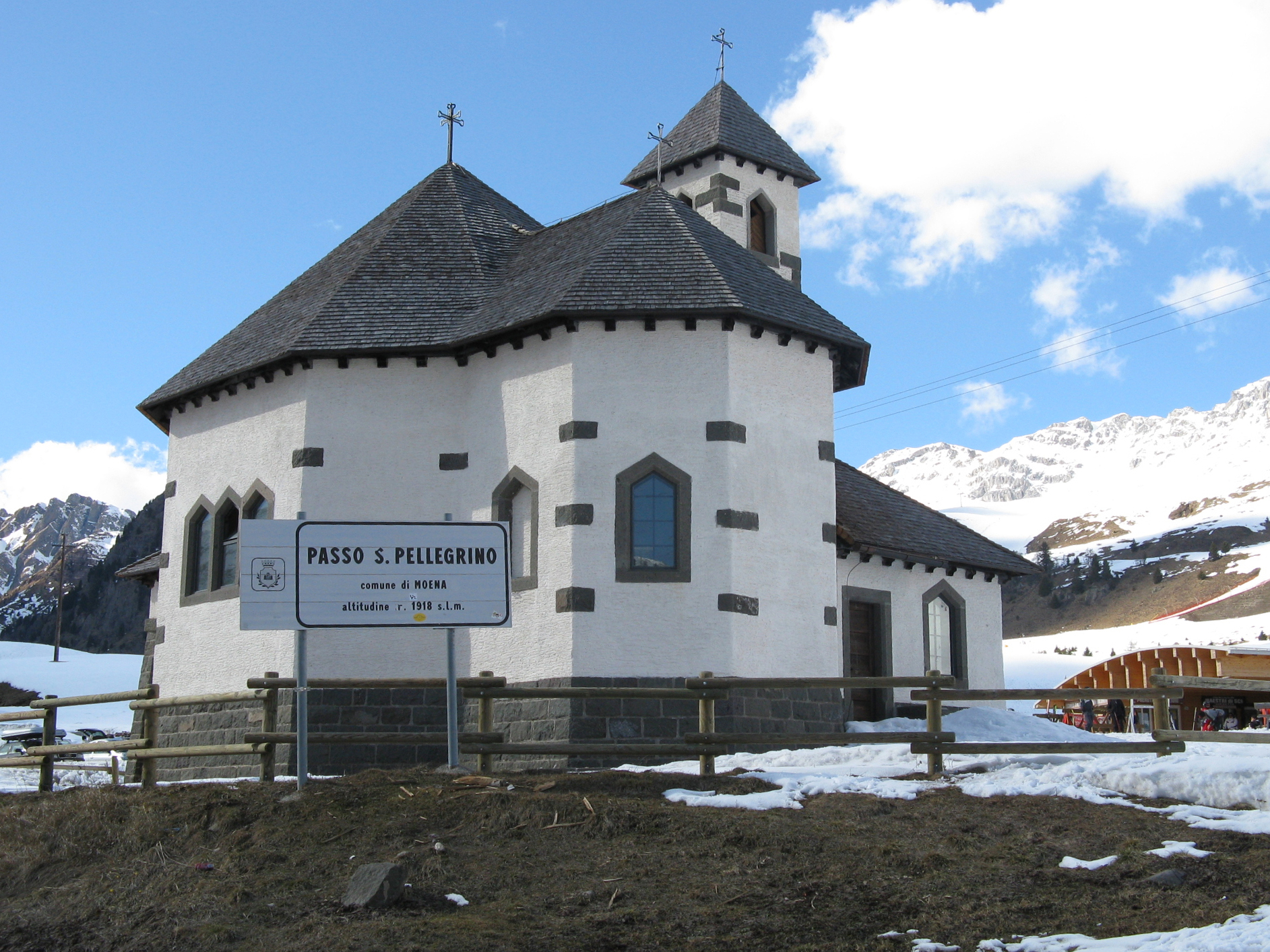

- Location within Alps
- Elevation: 1,918 metres (6,293 ft)

Third Approach
- Location: Italy
- Range: Dolomites
- Coordinates: 46°22′40″N 11°46′06″E

The San Pellegrino Pass (Italian: Passo San Pellegrino) (1918 m) is a high mountain pass in the Italian Dolomites. It connects the municipalities of Moena and Falcade. The ski resort of Trevalli is located at the pass. The area is also popular in summer for rock climbing. The peak of Cima Uomo and Col Margherita stand nearby on the north and the south sides. During World War I Austrian positions were on Cima Uomo while Italian trenches were on Col Margherita.

== See also ==
- List of highest paved roads in Europe
- List of mountain passes
