= Cima dell'Uomo =

Mountain in Switzerland

- Location within Switzerland

Highest point
- Elevation: 2,390 m (7,840 ft)
- Prominence: 286 m (938 ft)
- Parent peak: Finsteraarhorn
- Coordinates: 46°13′58.7″N 8°56′17.8″E

Geography
- Location: Ticino, Switzerland
- Parent range: Lepontine Alps

The Cima dell'Uomo (2,390 m) is a mountain of the Swiss Lepontine Alps, located north-west of Monte Carasso in the canton of Ticino. It lies east of the slightly higher Pizzo di Vogorno, near the southern end of the range separating the main valley of the Ticino from Valle Verzasca.

The summit is accessible to hikers via several trails on the south-west side.
