= Pizzo di Vogorno =

Mountain of the Lepontine Alps

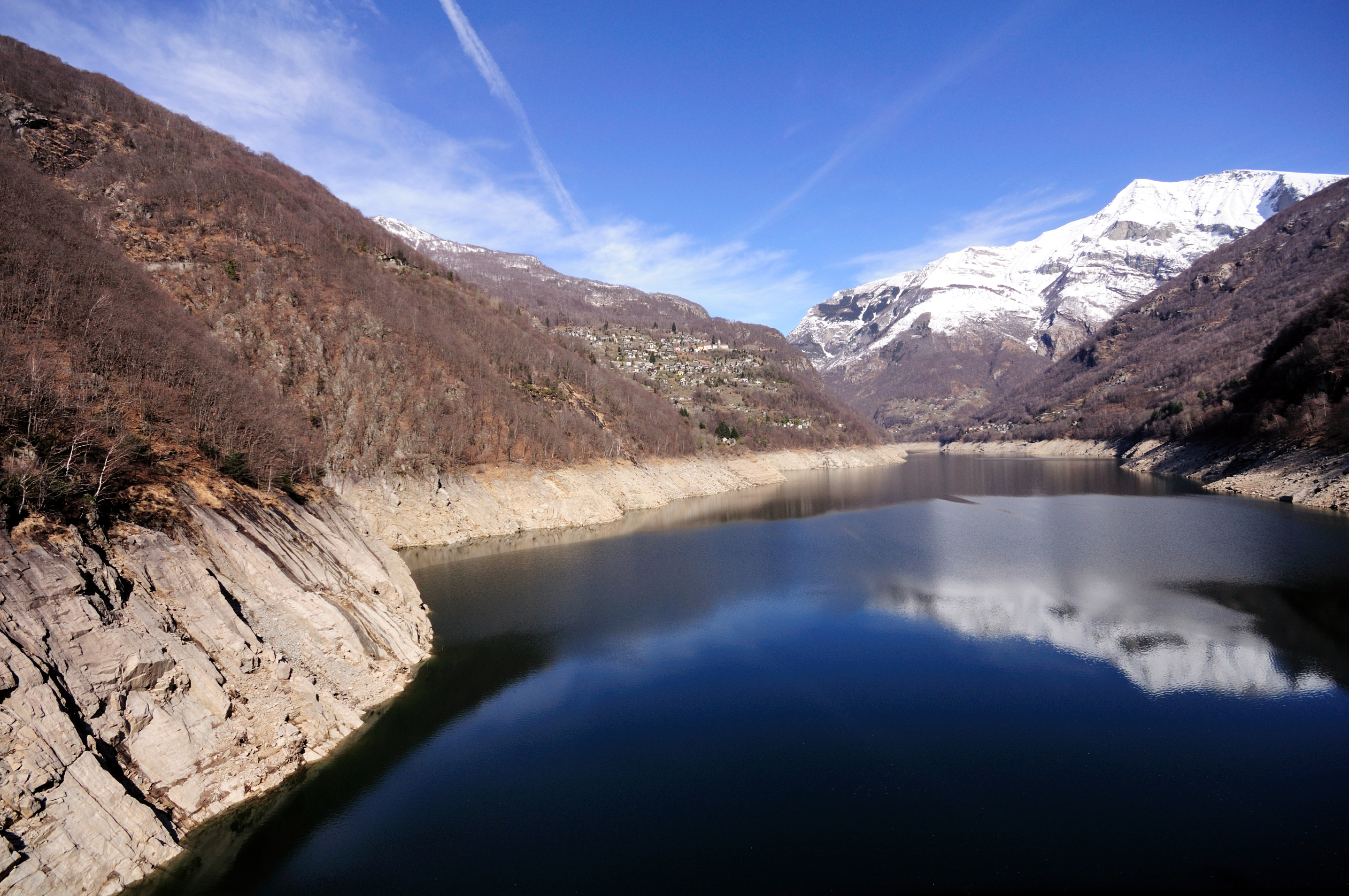
- Pizzo di Vogorno (right) from Lago di Vogorno

Highest point
- Elevation: 2,442 m (8,012 ft)
- Prominence: 227 m (745 ft)
- Parent peak: Poncione del Vènn
- Coordinates: 46°14′23″N 8°53′35″E

Geography
- Location within Switzerland
- Location: Ticino, Switzerland
- Parent range: Lepontine Alps

Pizzo di Vogorno is a mountain in the Lepontine Alps of Switzerland. It is located north-east of Lago di Vogorno and Vogorno, in the canton of Ticino.
