= Sasso Vernale =

Mountain in Italy

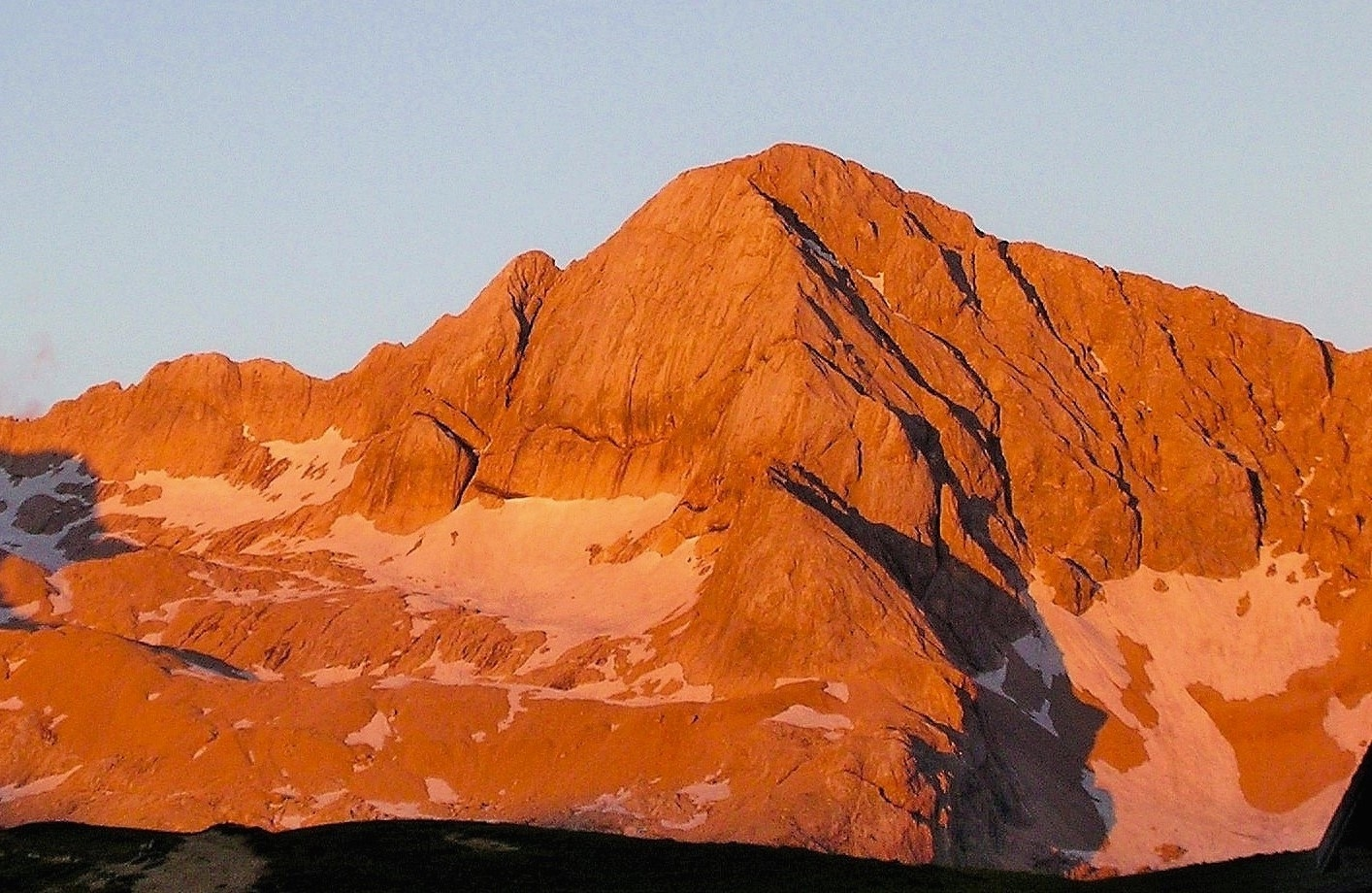
- West aspect at sunset

Highest point
- Elevation: 3,058 m (10,033 ft)
- Prominence: 357 m (1,171 ft)
- Parent peak: Marmolada
- Isolation: 1.93 km (1.20 mi)
- Coordinates: 46°25′08″N 11°50′25″E

Geography
- Location within Italy
- Interactive map of Sasso Vernale
- Country: Italy
- Province: Belluno / Trentino
- Protected area: Dolomites World Heritage Site
- Parent range: Dolomites; Marmolada Group
- Topo map(s): Tabacco 07 Alta Badia, Arabba - Marmolada

Geology
- Rock age: Triassic
- Rock type: Dolomite

Climbing
- First ascent: 1879

Sasso Vernale is a mountain on the common boundary shared by the provinces of Belluno and Trentino in northern Italy.

== Description ==
Sasso Vernale is a 3,058-meter-elevation (10,033-foot) summit in the Dolomites, and as part of the Dolomites is a UNESCO World Heritage site. Set on the boundary shared by the Trentino-Alto Adige/Südtirol and Veneto regions, the peak is located eight kilometers (5 miles) southeast of the municipality of Canazei. Precipitation runoff from the mountain's west slope drains to the Avisio, whereas the east slope drains into tributaries of the Piave. Topographic relief is significant as the summit rises 1,050 meters (3,445 feet) above the east and west slopes in two kilometers (1.24 miles). The nearest higher neighbor is Marmolada, 1.93 kilometers (1.2 miles) to the northeast. The first ascent of Sasso Vernale was made on July 12, 1879, by Gottfried Merzbacher, Cesare Tomè, Giorgio Bernard, and Santo Siorpaes via the north ridge.

== Climate ==
Based on the Köppen climate classification, Sasso Vernale is located in an alpine climate zone with long, cold winters, and short, mild summers. Weather systems are forced upwards by the mountains (orographic lift), causing moisture to drop in the form of rain and snow. The months of June through September offer the most favorable weather for visiting or climbing in this area.

== Gallery ==
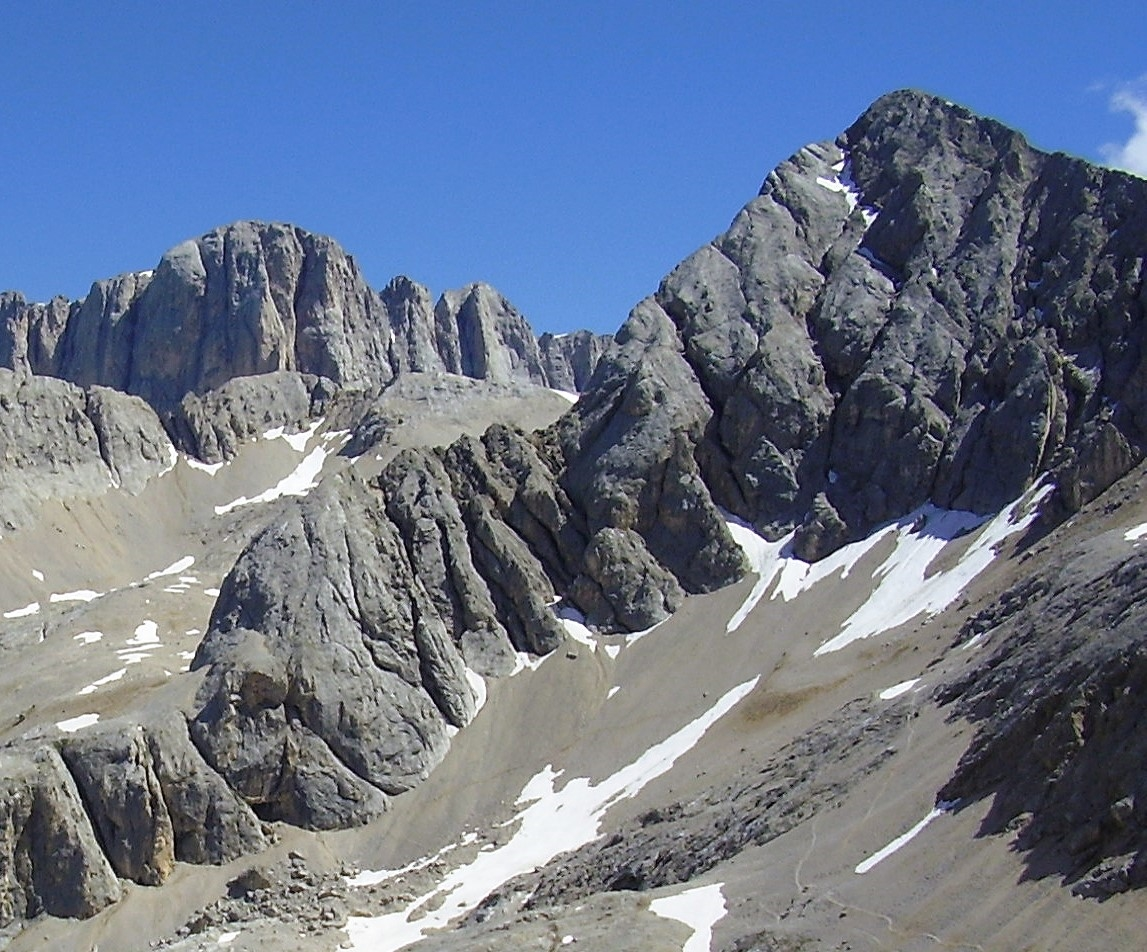
Summit of Marmolada (behind, left) and Sasso Vernale (right) from southwest

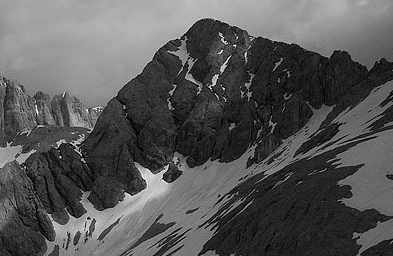
Southwest aspect

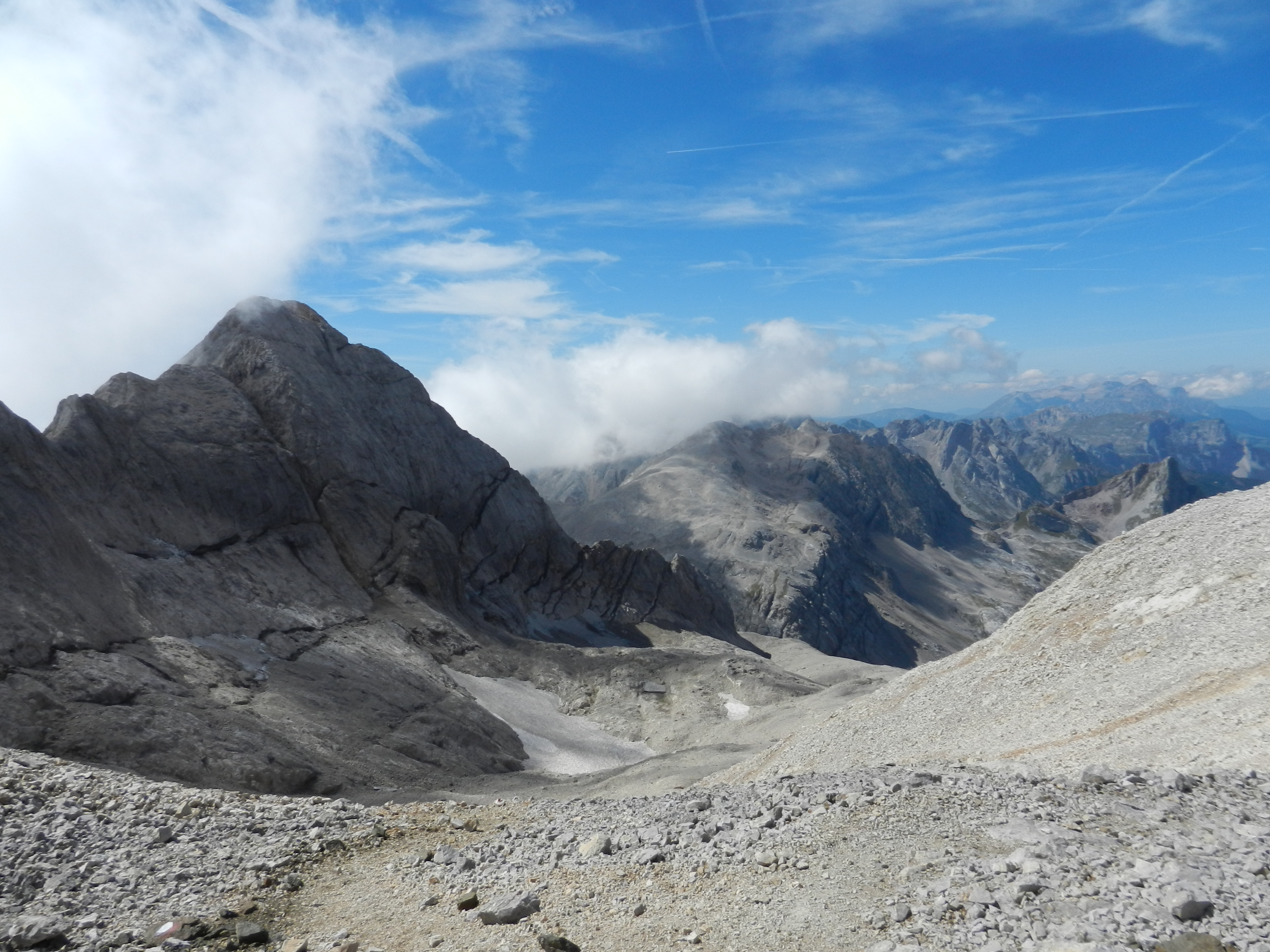
Sasso Vernale to left

Sasso Vernale in upper right, ENE aspect

== See also ==
- Southern Limestone Alps
