= Contra Dam =

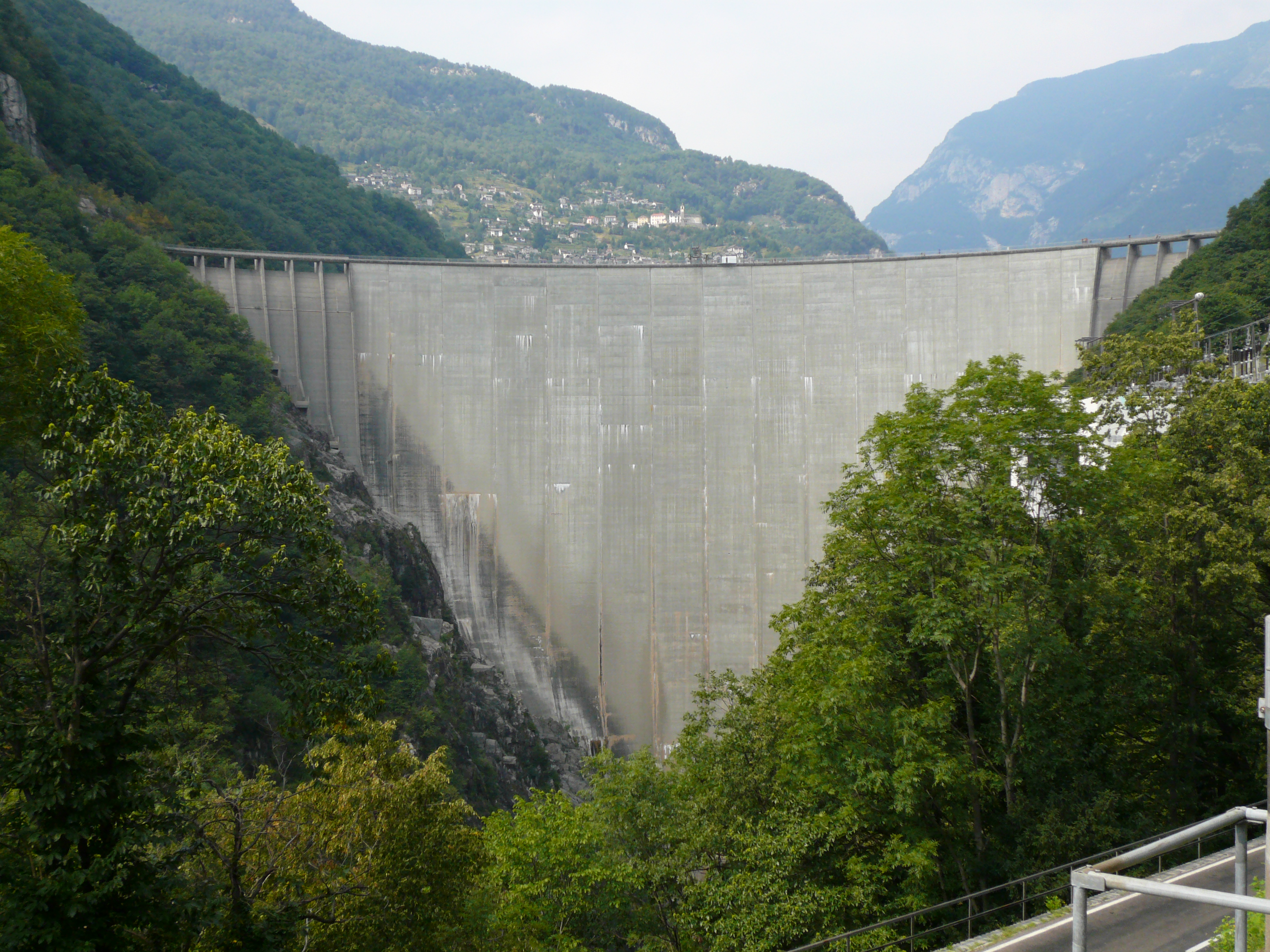
- Contra Dam

- Location within Switzerland
- Official name: Contra Dam
- Location: Ticino, Switzerland
- Coordinates: 46°11′48″N 8°50′52″E
- Construction began: 1961
- Opening date: 1965
- Owner: Verzasca SA

Dam and spillways
- Type of dam: Arch dam
- Impounds: Verzasca River
- Height: 220 m (720 ft)
- Length: 380 m (1,250 ft)
- Width (crest): 7 m (23 ft)
- Width (base): 25 m (82 ft)
- Dam volume: 660,000 m^{3} (23,000,000 ft^{3})
- Spillway type: Service, uncontrolled overflow
- Spillway capacity: 2,150 m^{3}/s (76,000 cu ft/s)

Reservoir
- Creates: Lago di Vogorno
- Total capacity: 105,000,000 m^{3} (85,000 acre⋅ft)
- Catchment area: 230 km^{2} (89 sq mi)
- Surface area: 160 ha (400 acres)

Power Station
- Hydraulic head: 277 m (909 ft) (Max)
- Turbines: 3 × 35 MW Francis-type
- Installed capacity: 105 MW
- Annual generation: 234 GWh

Aerial imagery of Contra Dam and Verzasca River with the reservoir empty

The Contra Dam, commonly known as the Verzasca Dam and the Locarno Dam, is an arch dam on the Verzasca River in the Val Verzasca of Ticino, Switzerland. The dam creates Lago di Vogorno 2 km (1.2 mi) upstream of Lake Maggiore and supports the 105 MW Verzasca hydroelectric power station. It was constructed between 1961 and 1965 and starting shortly after its reservoir was filled, a series of earthquakes related to its water load occurred until 1971. The dam is owned and operated by Verzasca SA and is the fourth tallest in Switzerland.

The dam became a popular bungee jumping venue after a James Bond stuntman jumped off it in the opening scene of the 1995 film GoldenEye; a stunt voted as the best movie stunt of all time in a 2002 Sky Movies poll.

== Background ==
On May 6, 1960, Verzasca SA was formed to construct the dam as the center-piece of the Verzasca Hydroelectric Complex. Construction of the dam began in 1961. The dam was designed and its construction supervised by Lombardi & Gellaro Ltd. Because the Contra Dam is at a lower elevation compared to other Swiss dams, warmer weather allowed construction to be carried out year-round. To divert the river and prepare a dry work-site for the dam, cofferdams were constructed, one of which redirected the river through a diversion tunnel with a 200 m^{3}/s (7,100 cu ft/s) capacity. As the river can have flows much higher than the tunnel's capacity, this was accepted as a risk by engineers. Excavation of the right side of the dam had to be expanded due to unforeseen weathered rock and designs were altered within 15 days.

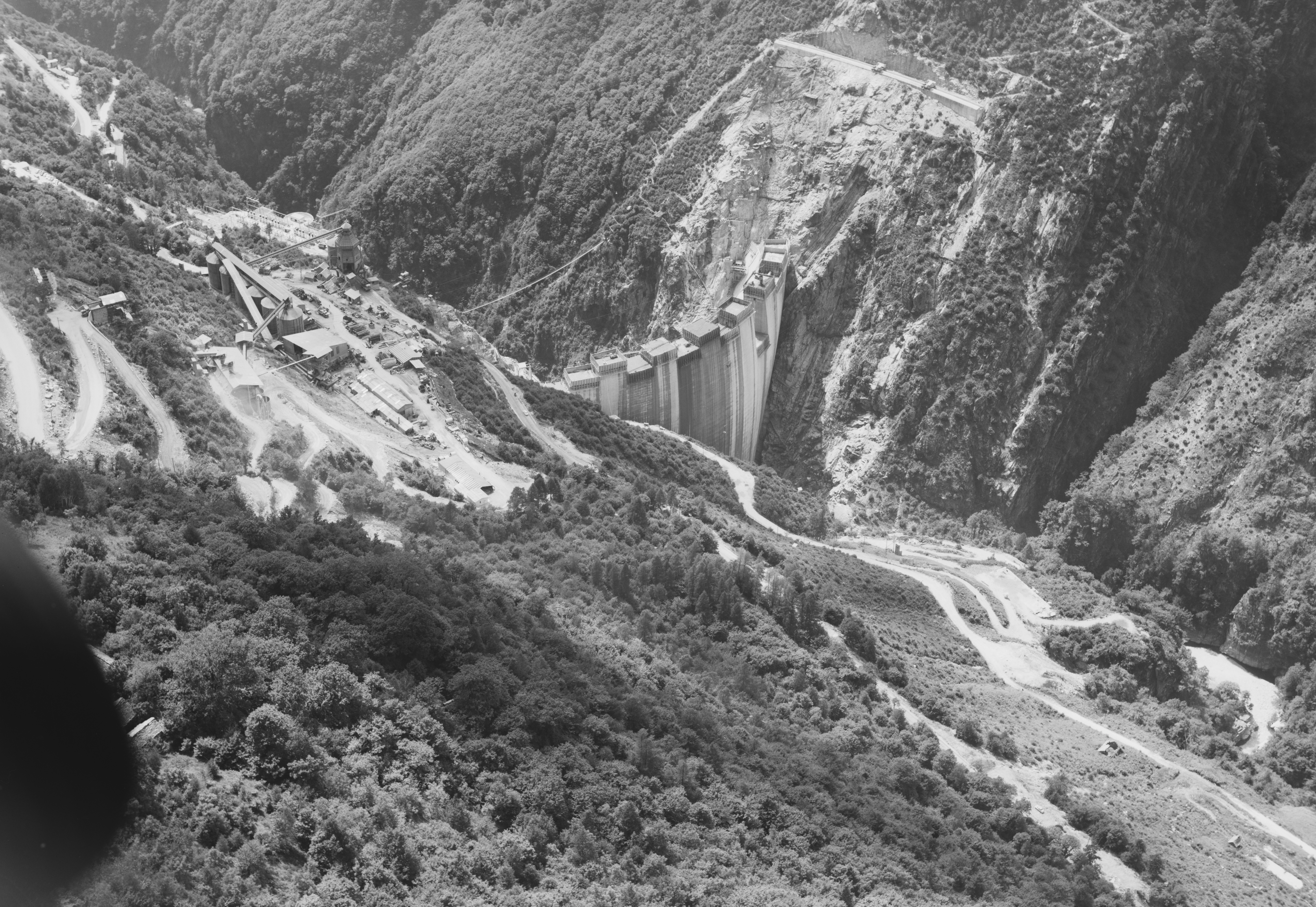
During the construction July 1964

Concrete pouring and placement occurred for 18 months, of which the maximum poured in a day was 3,100 m^{3} (110,000 ft^{3}) and in a month, 55,000 m^{3} (1,900,000 ft^{3}). The aggregate for the concrete was obtained from a quarry near the construction site. The high-quality and strength gneiss-rock was ground in a rotary crusher and prepared in the concrete mixture. To facilitate the contraction and settling of the concrete in the dam, it was cooled with a series of steel pipes that ran throughout the mass of concrete, with the exception of the top 30 m (98 ft) of the dam. A grout curtain was placed around and below the dam as well to prevent leakage, which consumed a large amount of cement. In August 1964, the reservoir began to fill and in September 1965, the reservoir was full and the dam completed.

=== Seismic activity ===
During what Dr. Giovanni Lombardi, the dam's designer, described as an "exceptionally rapid rise of water during the first filling" of the reservoir, beginning in August 1964, there were seismic shocks. The earthquakes began in May 1965 and the biggest shocks had occurred later in October and November after the reservoir was full. The epicenters were located at two faults near the dam. As many as 25 shocks occurred a day. The shocks stopped once the reservoir was emptied and no damage was found. After refilling, the shocks decreased and an "equilibrium" was believed to have been reached, one that did not respond to variations in water load. Another large shock occurred several years after filling. By 1971, there were no more seismic shocks around the dam or reservoir. No known detailed geological studies were conducted prior to construction of the dam and several faults are known to exist in the area.

== Specifications ==
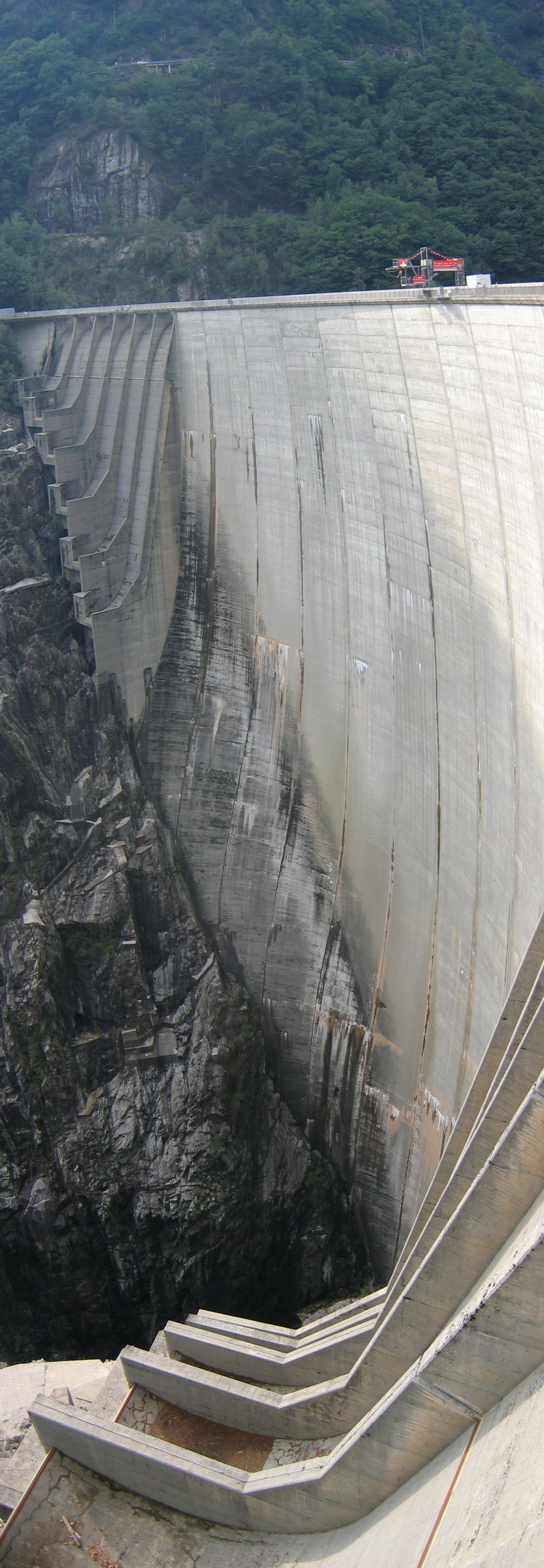

=== Dam ===
The Contra Dam is a concrete slender arch dam with a height of 220 m (720 ft) and crest length of 380 m (1,250 ft). The dam is 25 m (82 ft) wide at its base and 7 m (23 ft) wide at its crest. The dam structure contains 660,000 m^{3} (23,000,000 ft^{3}) of concrete and the structure itself has a surface area of 44,500 m^{2} (479,000 ft^{2}). The dam is slender in design and its horizontal arches are in an elliptical shape. The horizontal curvature of the dam decreases from the center of the dam towards its abutments and the curvature from the center of the arches increases from the crest down to the foundation. The thickness is constant with the exception of where the dam is received by its abutments; here it is thicker to reduce pressure on the rock, which can accept pressure of 70 kg/cm^{2} (1,000 psi). Vertically, the thickness of the dam increases from the crest down to the foundation and has a slight curve from the center towards the crest. This helps alleviate tensile stress for when the reservoir is not only full but empty. The dam's outlet works consist of two discharge pipes, capable of releasing up to 170 m^{3}/s (6,000 cu ft/s) each. One discharges into the original diversion tunnel and another is located at the base of the dam and discharges into the river valley below.

The dam creates Lago di Vogorno which has a 105,000,000 m^{3} (3.7×10^{9} ft^{3}) capacity and surface area of 160 ha (400 acres), collected from a catchment area of 230 km^{2} (89 sq mi). The Verzasca River has very irregular seasonal flows which can reach as high as 1,000 m^{3}/s (35,000 cu ft/s).

Lombardi considers it one of his most aesthetically pleasing dams, primarily because of the slenderness of the concrete arch and the "outstanding cleanness of the design." The design also reduced the amount of concrete needed, therefore reducing the cost as well.

=== Spillways ===
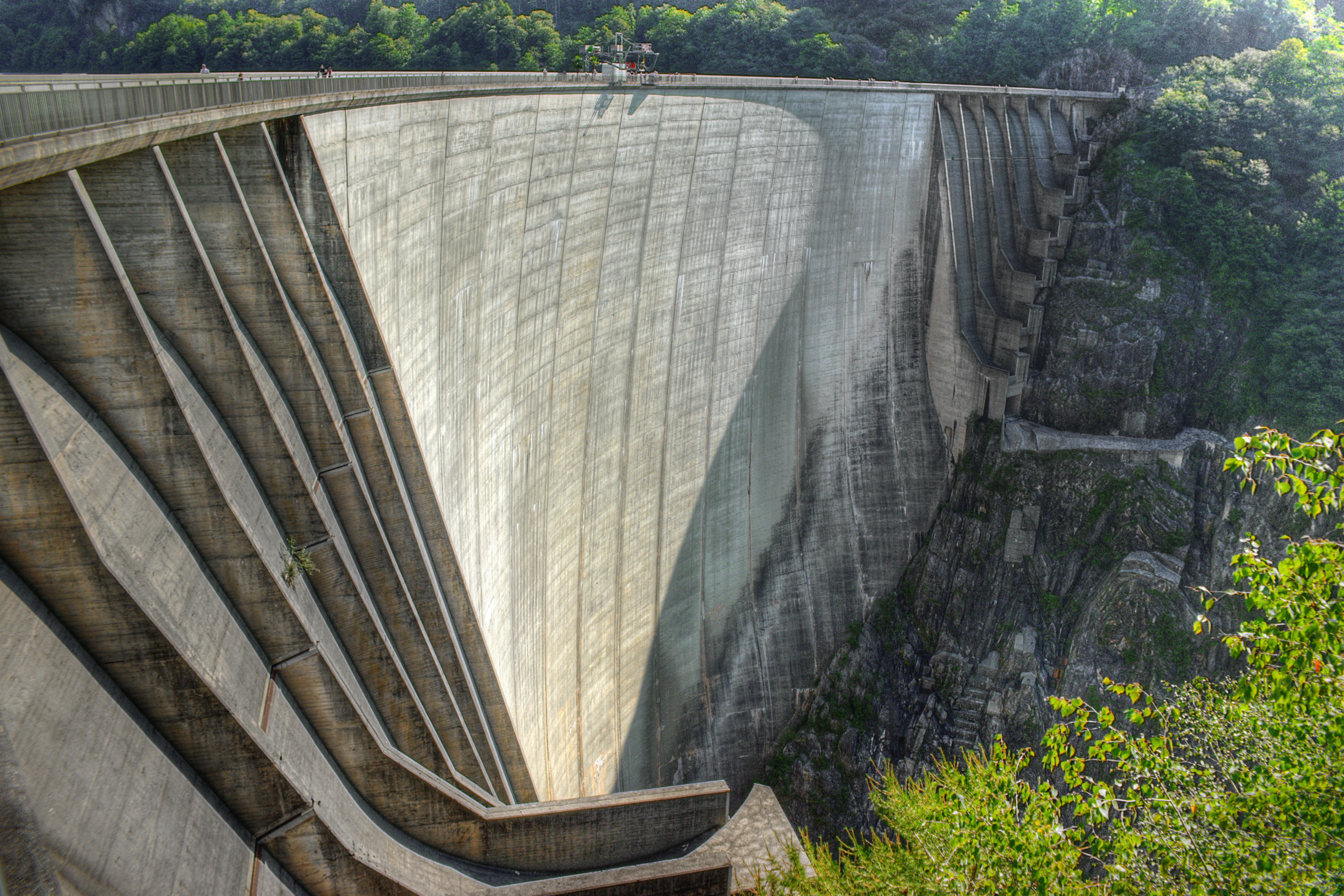

The dam has two spillways, each located on the structure, near its abutments on either side which have a maximum discharge capacity of 2,150 m^{3}/s (76,000 cu ft/s). Each spillway contains six fixed-crest weirs that are 12 m (39 ft) wide. From each opening, the water flows down a single chute to a flip bucket at the bottom of the spillway. The flip buckets dissipate and deflect the water towards the center axis of the valley 200 m (660 ft) below. The spillways were later modified to improve releases and function by increasing the size of the piers and adding additional lateral deflectors near the crest.

=== Power plant ===
The dam supports a 105 MW power station that contains 3 × 35 MW Francis turbines and generates an average of 234 GWh annually. Water from the reservoir at 470 m (1,540 ft) above sea level is transferred to an underground power station downstream at 193 m (633 ft) above sea level, affording a maximum hydraulic head of 277 m (909 ft). The power plant can discharge up to 50 m^{3}/s (1,800 cu ft/s) of water which exits via a 1.9 km (1.2 mi) tailrace tunnel into Lago di Verbano. The builder and owner is Verzasca SA; which has an 80-year concession on the power station which will expire in 2046.

== In popular culture ==
The opening scene of the 1995 James Bond film GoldenEye featured Bond jumping off the dam. The stunt was performed by British stuntman Wayne Michaels. The jump was voted as best movie stunt of all time in a 2002 Sky Movies poll. The dam doubled as the fictional Arkhangelsk Chemical Weapons Facility located in the northern Soviet Union during the Cold War. It is spelled "Arkangel" in the film.

The dam owners started to lease access to the dam, soon after GoldenEye was released, to a commercial bungee jump operator. According to the operator, over 10,000 people have jumped the 220 m (720 ft) from the dam.

Contestants bungee jumped off the dam as a Roadblock task in the first episode of the 14th season of The Amazing Race and the fifth episode of the 33rd season.

The climax scene of the Indian Bollywood movie Dhoom 3 was shot at this dam.

In October 2022, an artificial climbing wall built on the dam hosted an event called Red Bull Dual Ascent, the first competition climbing event in a multi-pitch format.
