= Verzasca (river) =

River in Switzerland

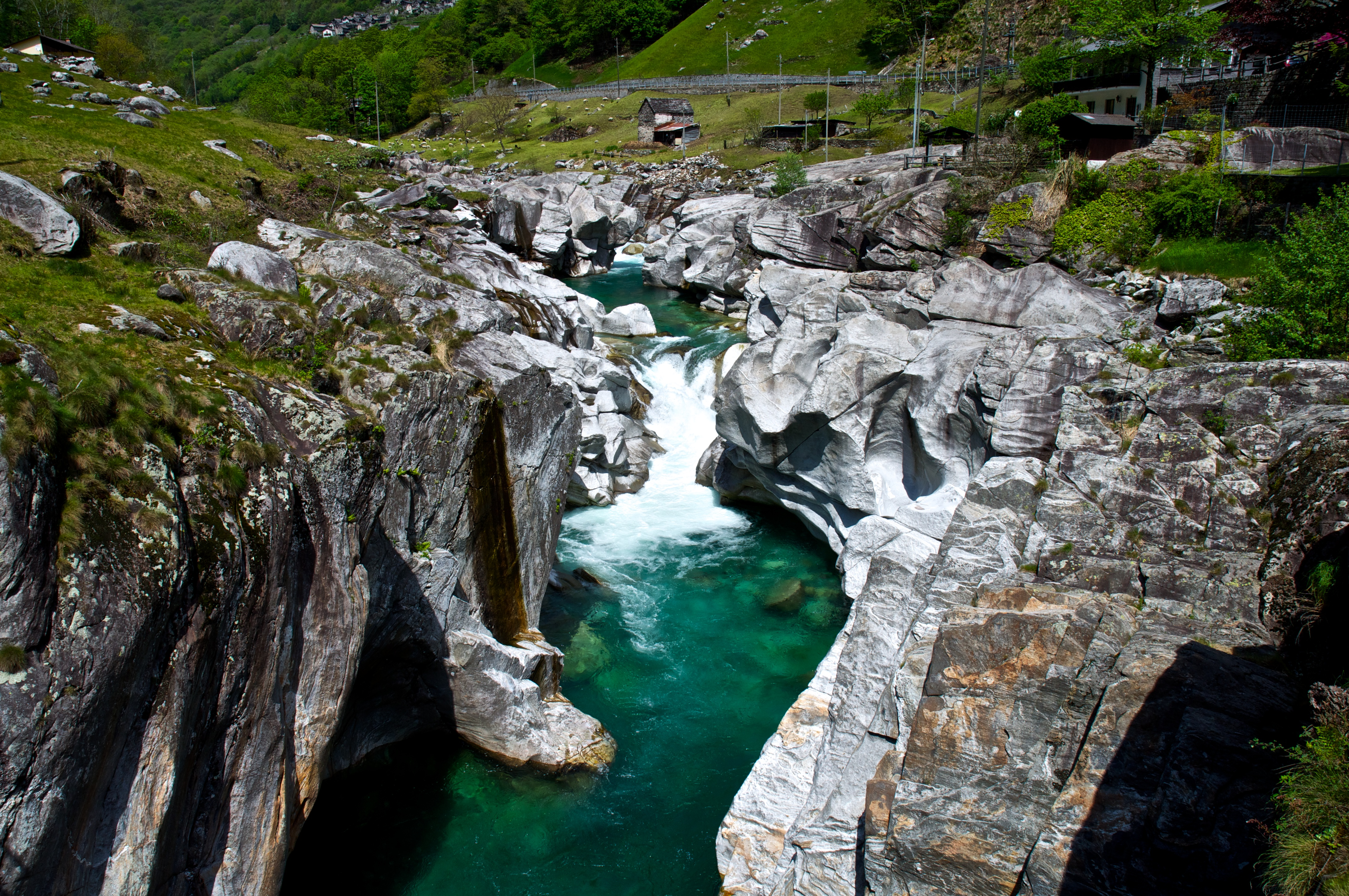
- The Verzasca at Lavertezzo

Location
- Country: Switzerland

Physical characteristics
- Source: Pizzo Barone
  - coordinates: 46.3908°N 8.7433°E
  - elevation: 2,864 m (9,396 ft)
- Mouth: Lake Maggiore
  - location: Lake Maggiore, Switzerland
  - coordinates: 46.1642°N 8.8528°E
- Length: 30 km (19 mi)

Basin features
- Progression: Lake Maggiore→ Ticino→ Po→ Adriatic Sea

The Verzasca is a 30-kilometre (19 mi) long Swiss Alpine river originating at Pizzo Barone and flowing into Lake Maggiore. It is known for its clear turquoise water and vibrant colored rocks, as well as its treacherous currents. The Verzasca Dam is a few kilometers upriver from Lake Maggiore.

== Geography ==
The Verzasca River valley (Valle Verzasca) is in Ticino, the Italian-speaking region of Switzerland. Chestnut trees thrive at the bottom of the valley. The river's water is crystal clear, and the depth does not exceed 10 metres (33 ft). Its average temperature is 7 to 10 °C (45 to 50 °F).

== Recreation ==
The river is a popular scuba diving location and the valley is used for bungee jumping. The diving conditions are usually best from late spring to early autumn.

== See also ==
- List of rivers of Switzerland
