= Grand Hotel des Iles Borromées =

Hotel in Stresa, Italy

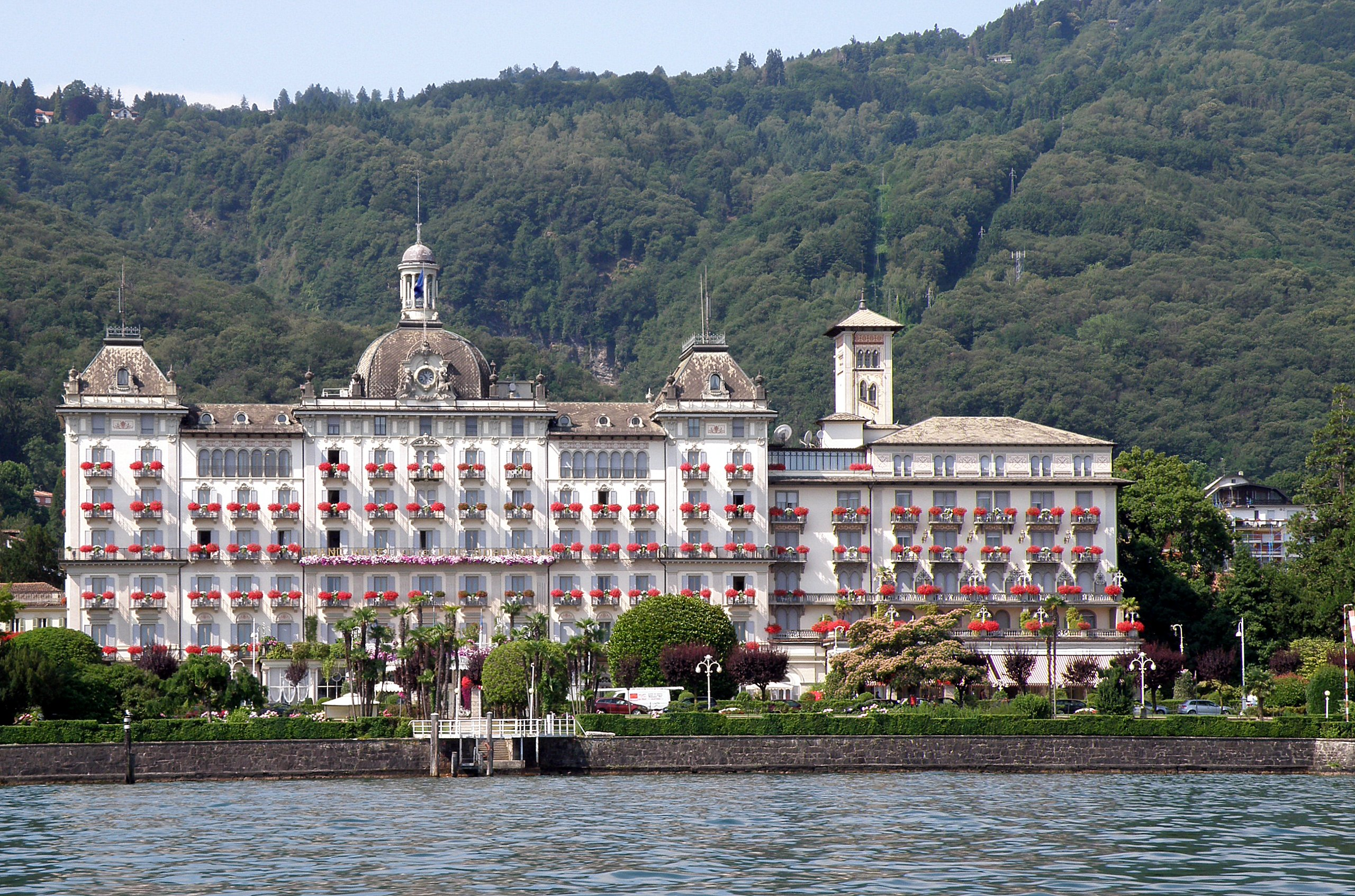
- Grand Hotel des Iles Borromées on Lake Maggiore, Italy
- Interactive map of the Grand Hotel des Iles Borromées area

General information
- Location: Stresa, Italy
- Coordinates: 45°53′12.06″N 8°31′58.7″E
- Opened: 1863; 163 years ago

Grand Hotel des Iles Borromées is a historic luxury hotel located on the shores of Lake Maggiore in Italy.

== History ==
The hotel was established by the Omarini brothers in the years following the unification of Italy. In 1860, they purchased some land on the shores of Lake Maggiore facing Isola Bella, one of the Borromean Islands, hence the name of the hotel, then built their hotel between 1861 and 1863. Construction works ended with the inauguration of the hotel on March 21, 1863.

Following the opening of the Simplon Tunnel in 1906, the number of visitors increased considerably. Thus, the hotel was enlarged: in 1908, the veranda was expanded, while three floors were added to the original building between 1911 and 1912.

After staying in Stresa in 1918, American writer Ernest Hemingway set part of the 1929 novel A Farewell to Arms in the hotel.

== Gallery ==
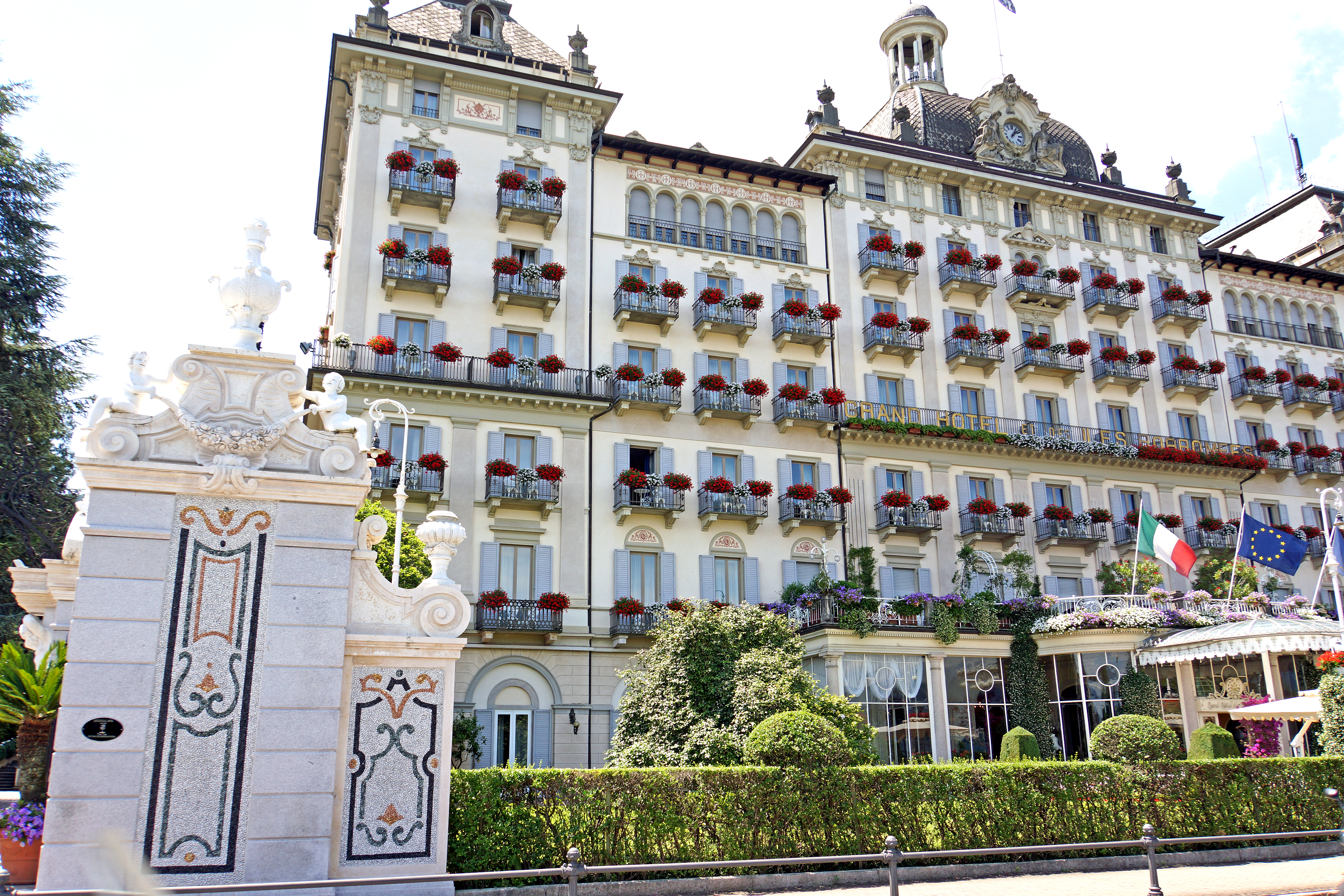

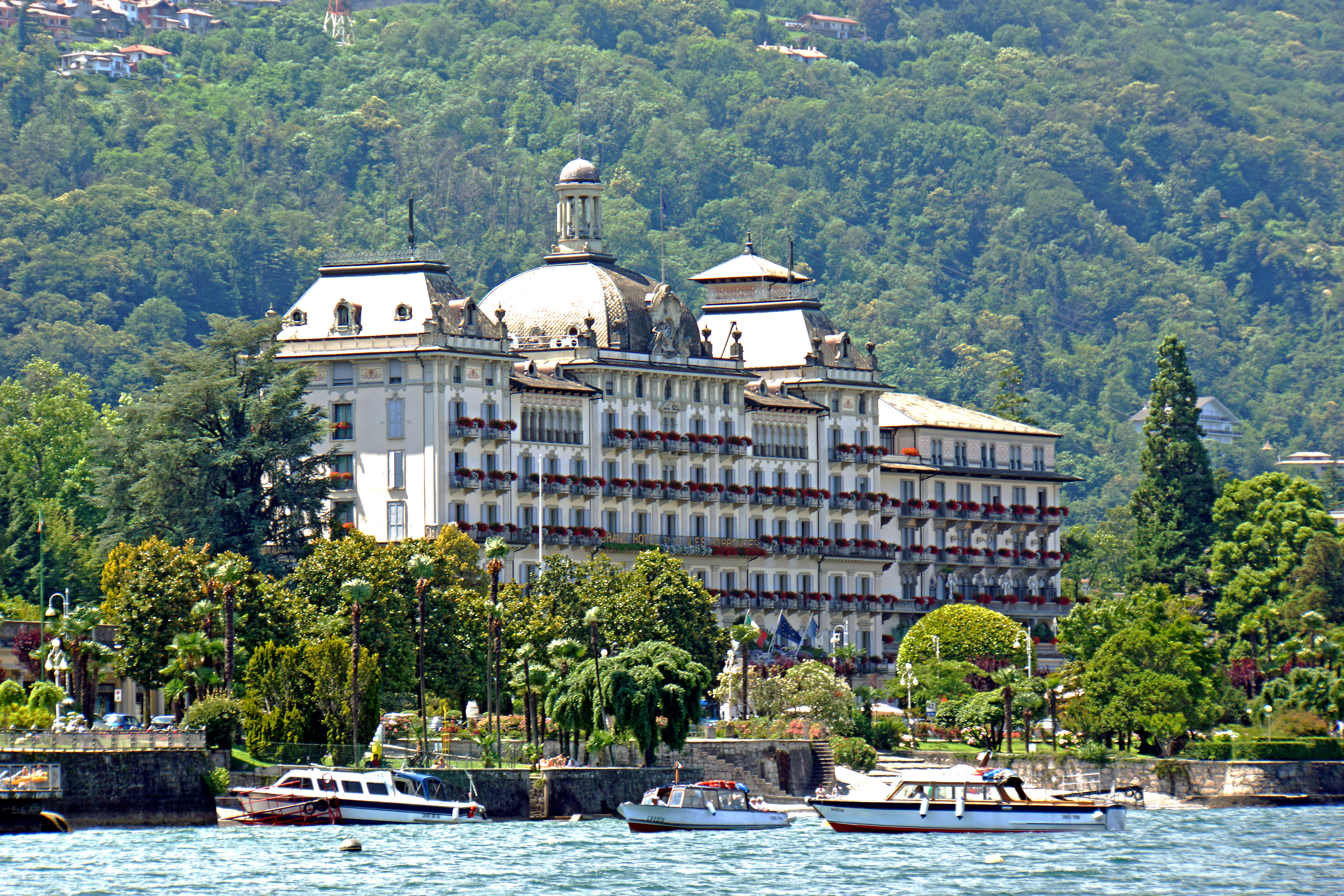

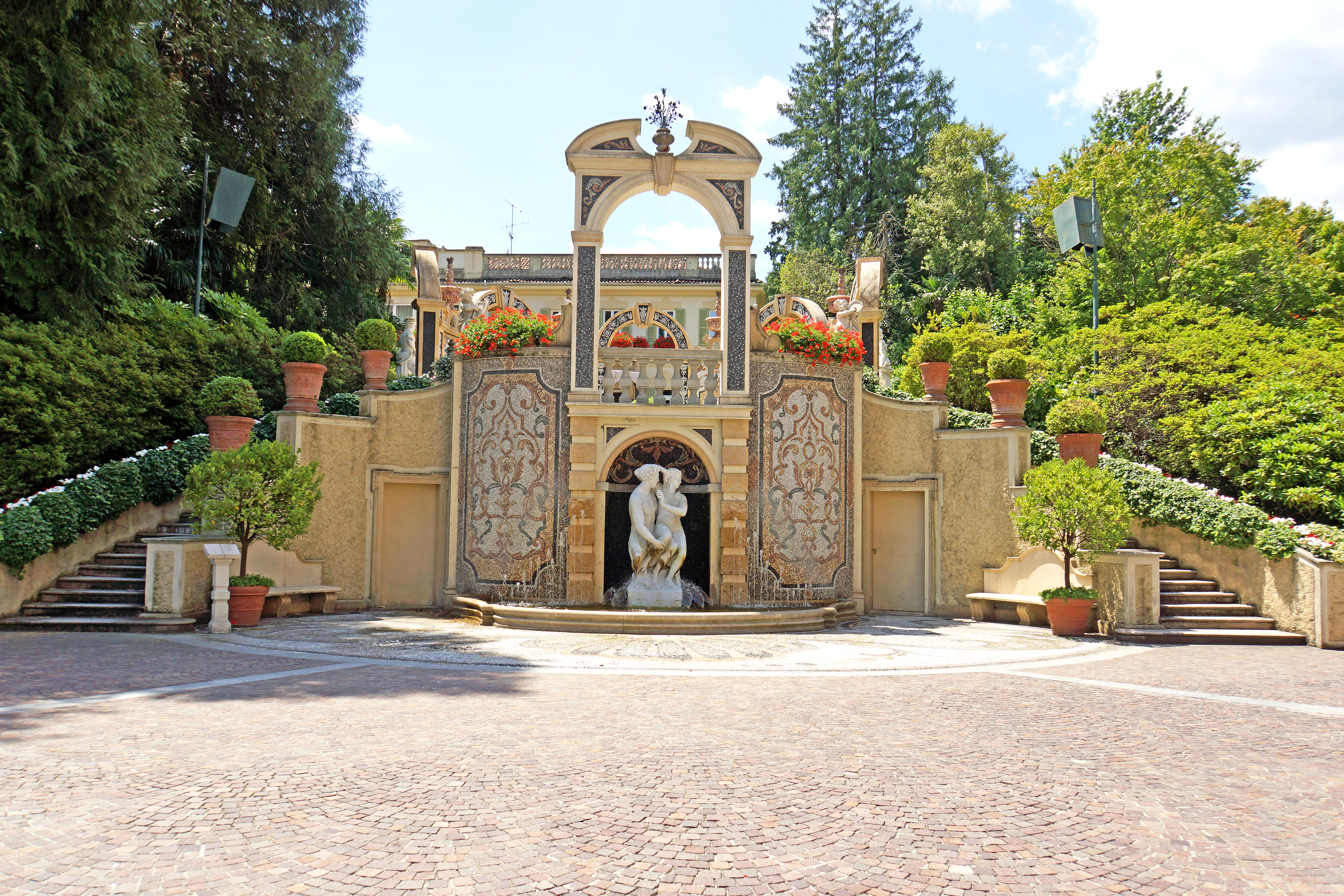

== See also ==
- Regina Palace Hotel
