= Brig, Switzerland =

Town in Valais, Switzerland

Brig
- Municipality
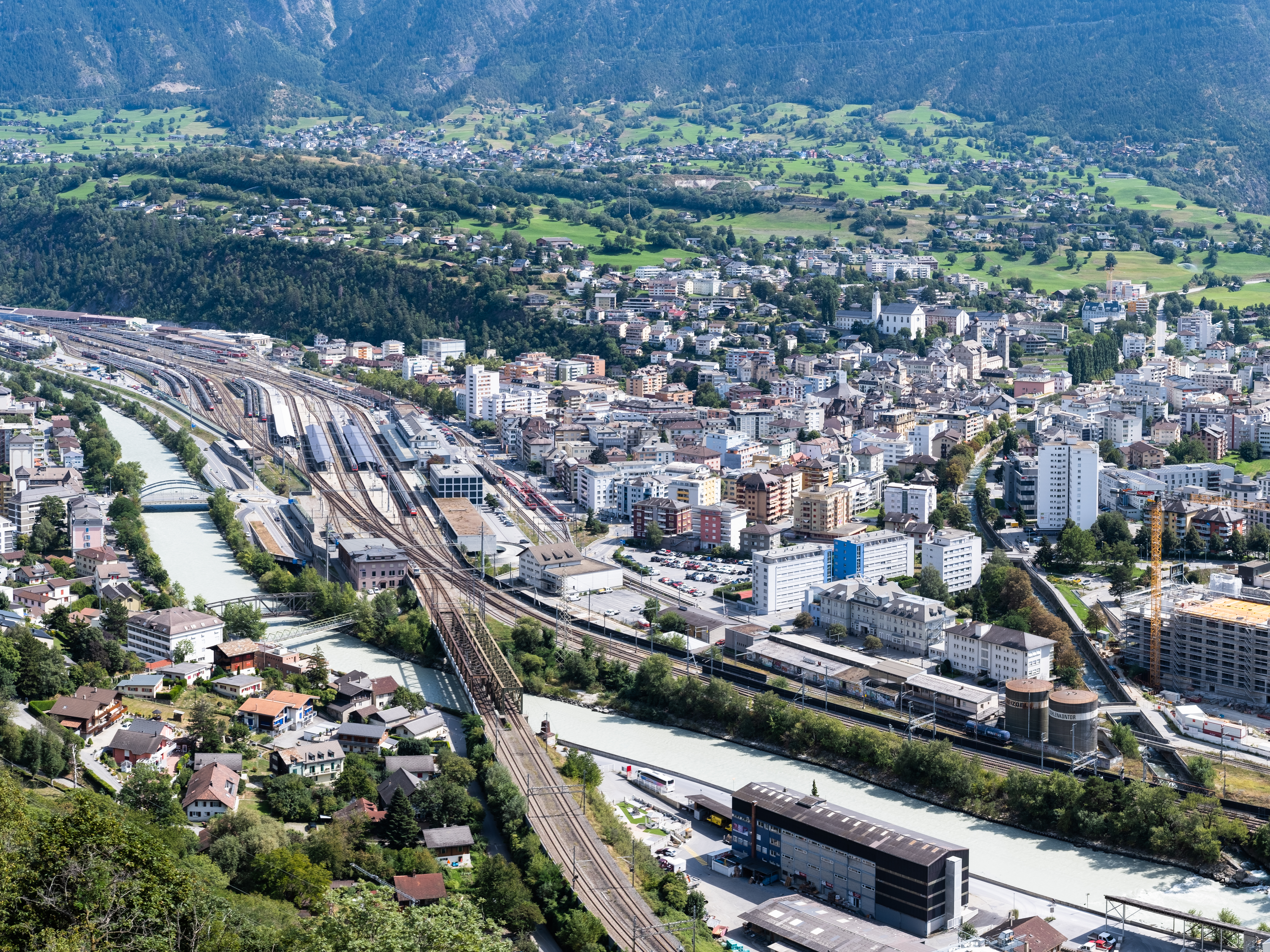

- Flag Coat of arms
- Location of Brig
- Location within Switzerland Location within Canton of Valais
- Coordinates: 46°19′N 7°59′E
- Country: Switzerland
- Canton: Valais
- District: Brigue

Area
  - Total: 38 km^{2} (15 sq mi)
- Elevation: 691 m (2,267 ft)

Population
  - Total: 12,162
  - Density: 320/km^{2} (830/sq mi)
- Demonym: Brigois
- Time zone: UTC+01:00 (CET)
  - Summer (DST): UTC+02:00 (CEST)
- ISO 3166 code: CH-VS
- Website: https://www.myswitzerland.com/en-ch/destinations/brig/

Brig, known as Brigue in French and Briga in Italian, is a town and former municipality in the canton of Valais. It is part of the municipality of Brig-Glis.

== Toponymy ==
The name Brig comes from the Celtic Briga, meaning “hill fortress” or “height, then castle”.

== History ==
Mentioned for the first time in 1215, Brigue was not recognized as a town until the 17th century. It underwent major development thanks to Kaspar Jodok von Stockalper (1609-1691), a shrewd businessman nicknamed “King of Simplon”.

Brig’s thermal springs were already renowned during the Middle Ages. Ruined by a landslide in the 15th century, they were cleared in 1471 and annexed to the public baths.

The Jesuit Collège du Saint-Esprit, built between 1673 and 1688, is a fine example of Baroque architecture.

On January 25, 1913, Brig was the starting point for Juan Bielovucic's 28-minute monoplane flight across the Alps to Domodossola.

On September 24, 1993, the town was partially devastated by flooding, following the overflow of the Saltina River.

== Population ==
=== Demonym and nicknames ===
This town’s inhabitants are called Brigois.

They are nicknamed the Brigands, and are also known as Holzschüö, Sschüöblätza and Turugeuche in Swiss German, i.e. the clogs, the bakers and those who take pride in their turreted houses.

=== Demography ===
The community had 468 inhabitants in 1798, 412 in 1802, 596 in 1827, 721 in 1850, 1,012 in 1860, 1,172 in 1888, 2,182 in 1900, 3,132 in 1920, 3,854 in 1950, 5,191 in 1970, 9,608 (including Glis and Brigerbad) in 1980, 10,602 in 1990 and 11,590 in 2000.

=== Famous people ===
- Pierre Emmanuel Jacques de Rivaz (1745–1827), Swiss general in the armies of the French Republic, was born in Brig.
- Silvan Zurbriggen (born 1981), former world cup alpine skier and runner-up in the world slalom.
- Gianni Infantino (born 1970), lawyer, FIFA President since 2016.
- Nico Hischier, professional ice hockey player with the New Jersey Devils.
- Henri Colpi, French filmmaker born in Brig July 15, 1921, died January 14, 2006 in Menton, France.
- Viola Amherd, Federal Councillor born on June 7, 1962, in Brig-Glis, President of the Swiss Confederation for the year 2024.

=== Places and monuments ===
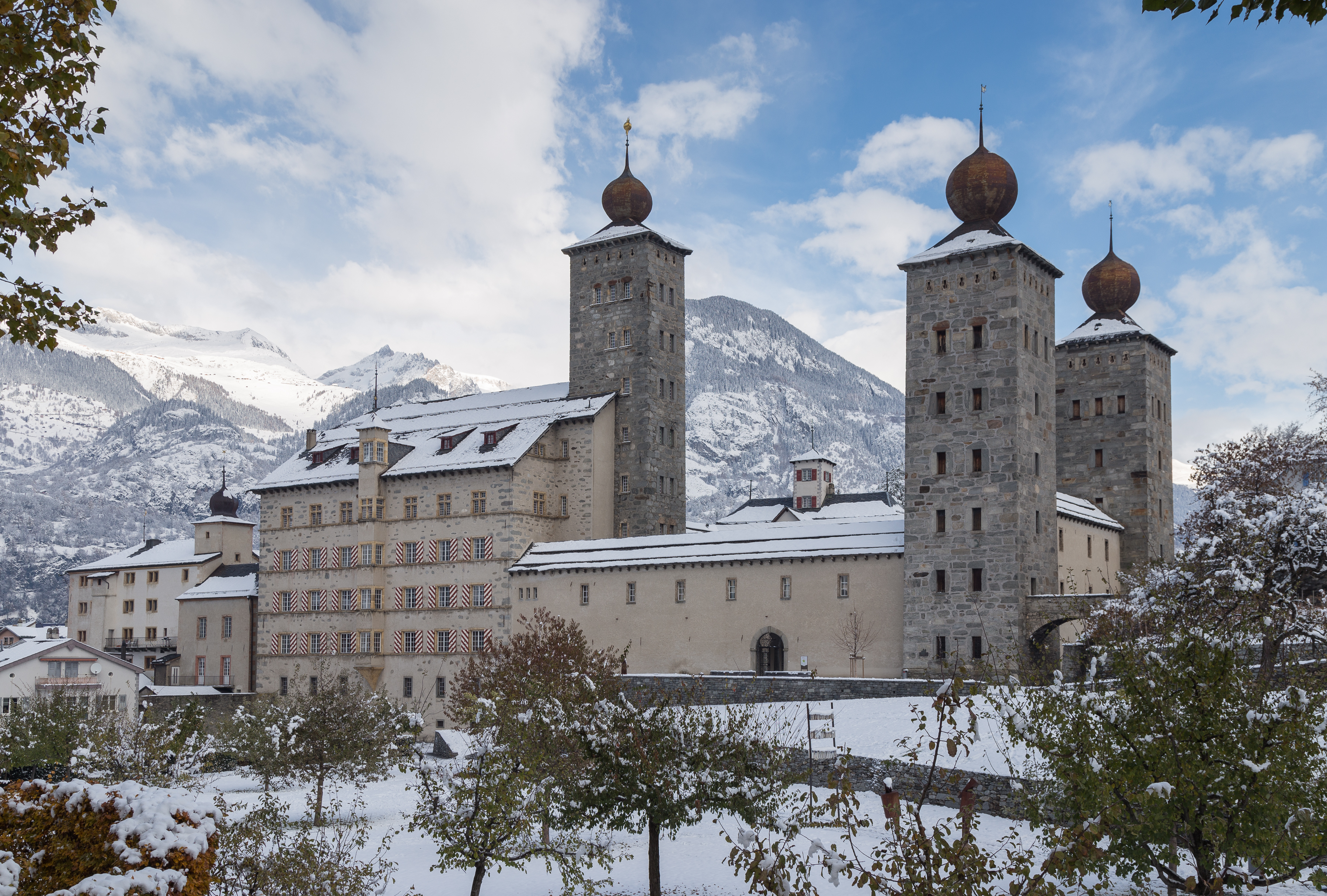
Stockalper Palace

- Stockalper Castle
- Brig tunnel on the Simplon line
- The Gamsen town wall dates back to the 14th century.
- A monument to aviation pioneer Jorge Chávez Dartnell has been built on the Place Saint-Sebastien.

== Transportation ==
=== Main roads ===
- Brig is crossed by main road 9.
- In Brig, main road 19 leads to the Goms valley.
- Via the A9 Vallorbe-Lausanne-Brigue freeway.
- The E62 via the A9, then main road 9 over the Simplon Pass.
- SBB offers car loading (Autoverlad) to Italy, via the Simplon tunnel and Iselle di Trasquera.

=== Railway lines ===
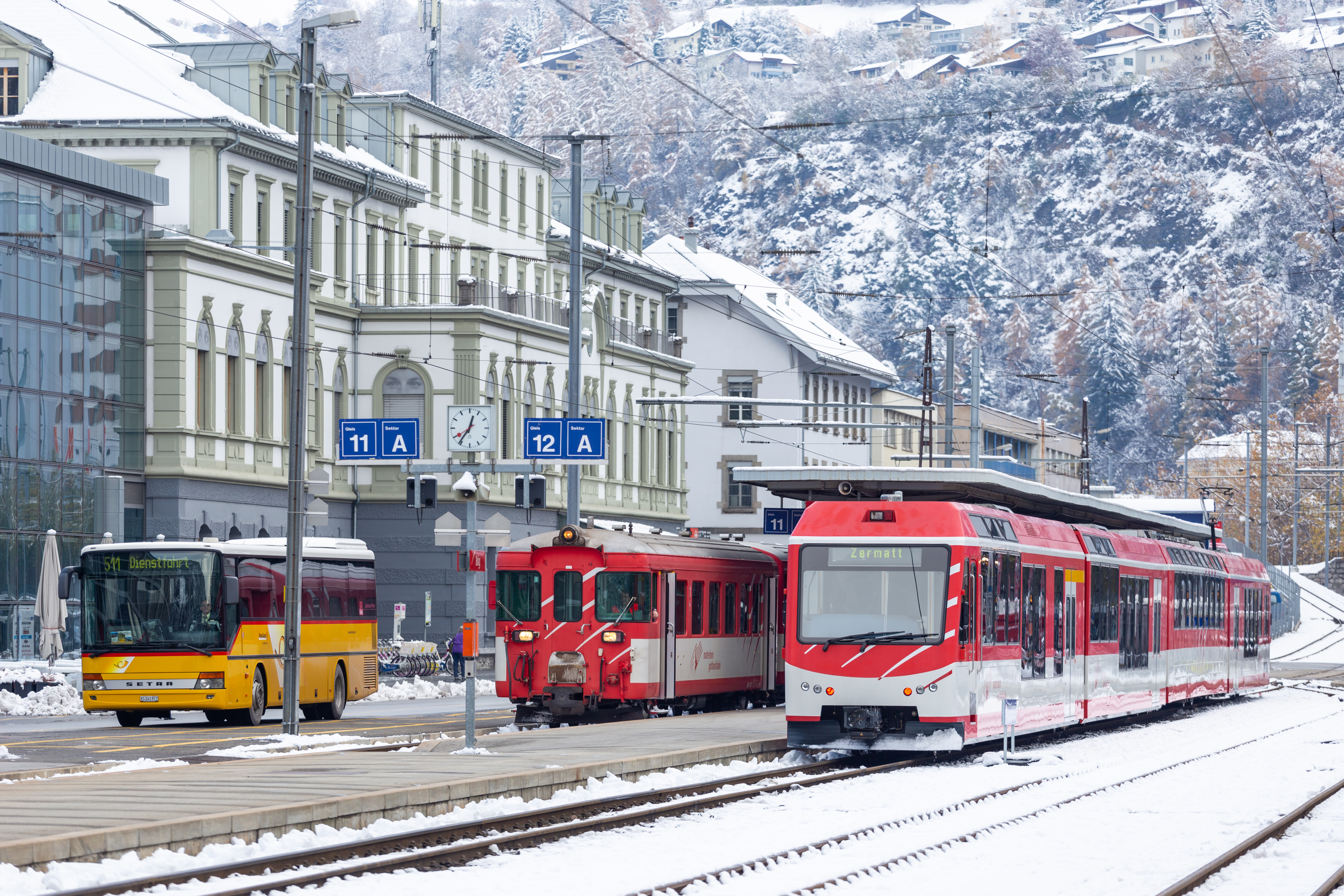
Brig railway station and station square with trains of the Matterhorn-Gotthard Railway

- By SBB line (Simplon line), Lausanne-Sion-Brigue-Simplon-Domodossola-Milan
- By BLS line (Lötschberg line), Zürich HB or Basel-Berne-Spiez-Brigue-Simplon-Domodossola-Milan
- Only in winter, the town is served by a TGV Lyria, Paris-Lausanne-Brigue
- By the Glacier Express line, Saint-Moritz-Chur-Disentis-Andermatt-Brigue-Zermatt
- At regional level, the Matterhorn-Gotthard Bahn serves the city to Andermatt and Zermatt destinations.

==== Road level (Bus) ====
● PostBus offers connections to Saas Fee, Naters, Visp and Domodossola in Italy via the Simplon Pass.

== Tourism ==
It is located near the resorts of Belalp, Saas-Fee, Zermatt, Fiesch, Bettmeralp, etc. The thermal baths at Brigerbad attract many visitors.

== See also ==
- Brig railway station
- Brig-Glis
- Valais
- Switzerland
