= Domodossola =

Domodossola Dòmm (Lombard)
- Comune
- Città di Domodossola
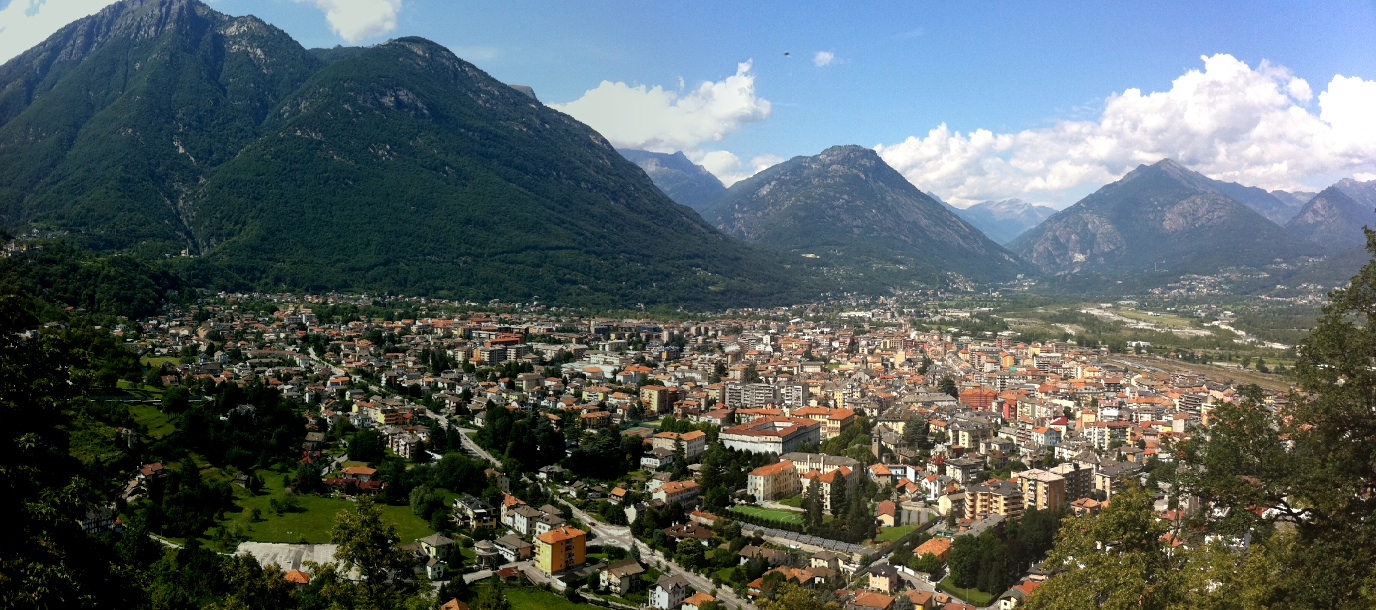

- Flag Coat of arms

- Location within Italy Location within Piedmont
- Coordinates: 46°07′N 8°17′E
- Country: Italy
- Region: Piedmont
- Province: Verbano Cusio Ossola (VB)
- Frazioni: Campoccio, Cisore, Crosiggia, Domodossola-Oltrebogna, Monte Ossolano, Prata, Quartero, Rogoledo, Trontana

Government
  - Mayor: Fortunato Lucio Pizzi

Area
  - Total: 36.89 km^{2} (14.24 sq mi)
- Elevation: 272 m (892 ft)

Population (1 January 2021)
  - Total: 17,930
  - Density: 486.0/km^{2} (1,259/sq mi)
- Demonym: Domese(i)
- Time zone: UTC+1 (CET)
  - Summer (DST): UTC+2 (CEST)
- Postal code: 28845
- Dialing code: 0324
- Patron saint: Sts. Gervasius and Protasius
- Saint day: 19 June
- Website: Official website

Domodossola (Italian: [ˌdɔmoˈdɔssola]), (Note: Archaically spelled Domo d'Ossola or Duomo d'Ossola, meaning "Cathedral in the Ossola (valley)". It was also known as Oscela, Oscella, Oscella dei Leponzi, Ossolo or Ossola Lepontiorum.) locally also Domo (Ossolano: Dòmm), is a city and comune (municipality) in the Province of Verbano-Cusio-Ossola, in the region of Piedmont, northern Italy.

Located at the foot of the Alps, in the Toce plain at the crossroads of the Bognanco, Divedro, Antigorio, Vigezzo and Isorno valleys, Domodossola is the main center of the Ossola and the second largest town in the province of Verbano-Cusio-Ossola after the provincial capital, Verbania.

== Geography ==
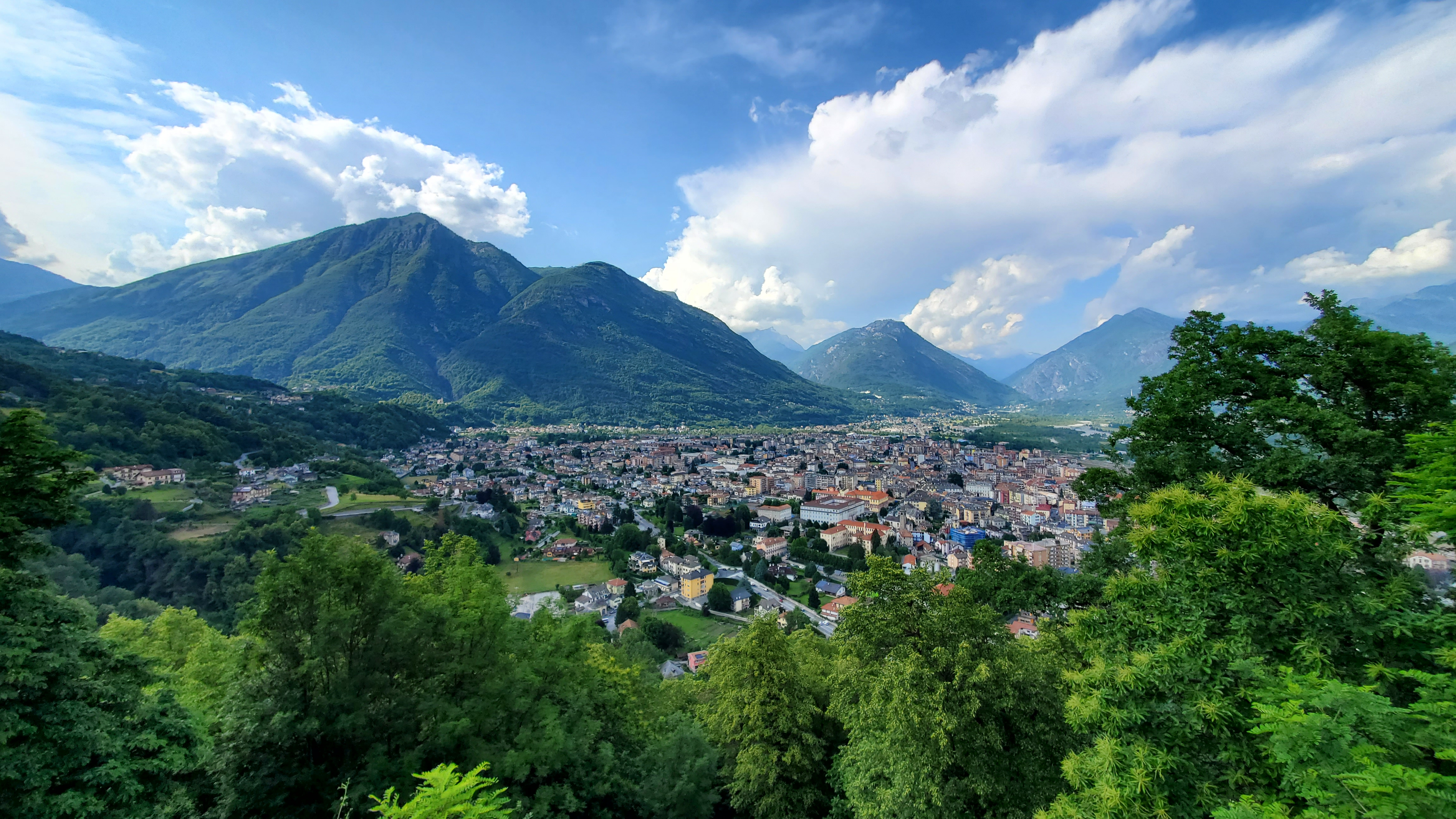
A panoramic view of Domodossola as seen from the vantage point of the Sacro Monte

Domodossola is situated at the confluence of the Bogna and Toce rivers, 272 meters above sea level. The lowest point of the municipal territory is 238 meters above sea level, whereas the highest point is 2,365 meters above sea level. Much of the municipal territory is mountainous; the ski resort of Domobianca, on the slopes of the Moncucco (1,902 meters), lies within the territory of Domodossola.

Besides the city proper, Domodossola includes forty-nine hamlets: Alla Fraccia, Andosso, Anzuno, Asparedo, Bacenetto, Baceno, Barro, Campei, Campione, Campoccio Dentro, Campoccio Fuori, Casa delle Rane, Case Lazzaro, Case Pioda, Castanedo, Castelluccio, Cimavilla, Cisore, Corte, Croppo, Crosiggia, Cruppi, Gabi Valle, Maggianigo, Monsignore, Monteossolano, Monticchio, Motto, Motto Mattarella, Piccioni, Prata, Prebletto, Pregliasca, Premone, Quana, Quartero, Rogoledo, Ronchetto, Sacro Monte Calvario, Sala, San Quirico, Tagliaroli, Torcelli, Torre Mattarella, Trontana, Vallesone, Valsorda, Vauza, and Zoncalina.

In 1865, the municipality of Domodosola absorbed the former municipality of Cisore, and two years later it did the same with Calice Ossolano; in 1928 it absorbed another abolished municipality, Varna, and in 1959 it was further enlarged by annexating Monteossolano, a former hamlet of Bognanco.

== History ==
Archaeological findings have shown that the area was inhabited since prehistoric times. Domodossola, then known as Oscella, was the chief town of the Lepontii when the Romans conquered the region in 12 BCE; a roman road linking Mediolanum to Lake Maggiore (Via Mediolanum-Verbannus) passed through it. After the fall of the Roman Empire, the town became part of the Ostrogothic Kingdom; the Ostrogoths of Theodoric the Great fortified the nearby Mattarella hill.

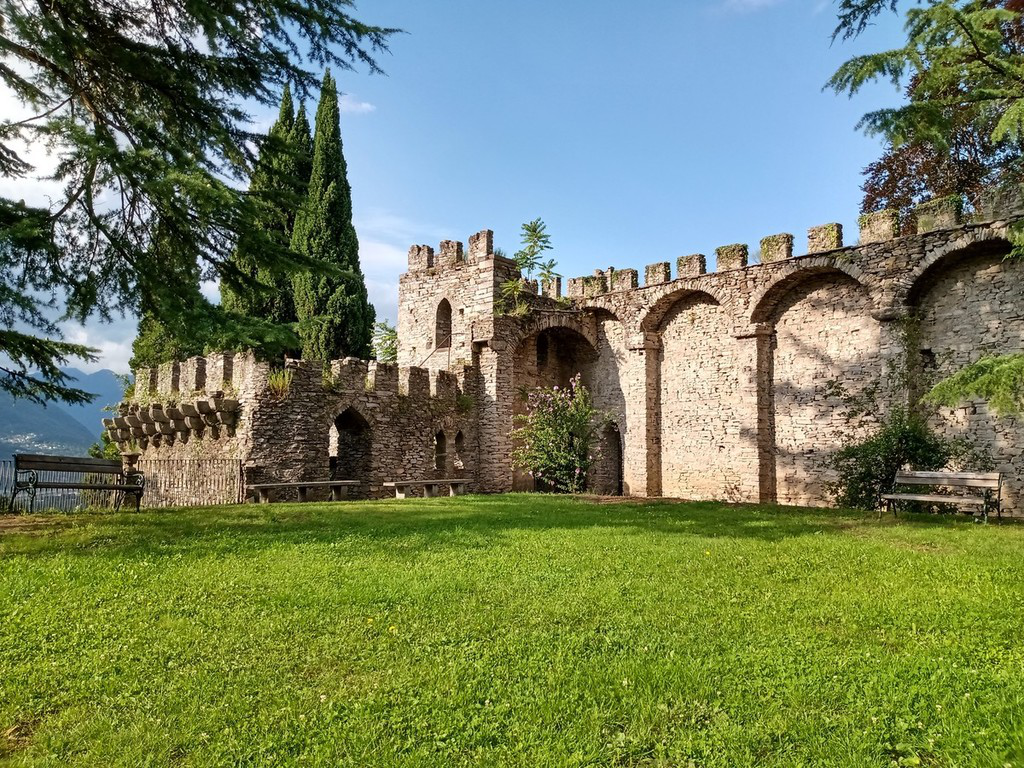
Ruins of Castle Mattarella

During the sixth century, Oscella was sacked and burned by the Lombards, which were later driven out by the Franks. The town and the surrounding region then became a fief of the bishop-count of Novara, who built a castle there; Oscella had by then become Oxilla. During the Middle Ages Domodossola (which following the construction of a collegiate church in the eleventh century had been called Domus Oxile, which gradually evolved into its modern name) was repeatedly raided by the Swiss coming from present-day Canton Valais and damaged during the conflict between the Guelphs and the Ghibellines, which led the decision, in 1381, to swear fealty to Gian Galeazzo Visconti, Lord of Milan, in exchange for military protection. The town thus became part of the Lordship of Milan (later the Duchy of Milan) under the Visconti and later Sforza rule.

As a result of the Italian Wars, Domodossola came briefly under the control of the French, then the Spaniards for nearly two centuries, and finally the Austrians in 1706. In 1743 the Treaty of Worms, during the War of the Austrian Succession, resulted in Domodossola and the surrounding region being given to the Kingdom of Sardinia.

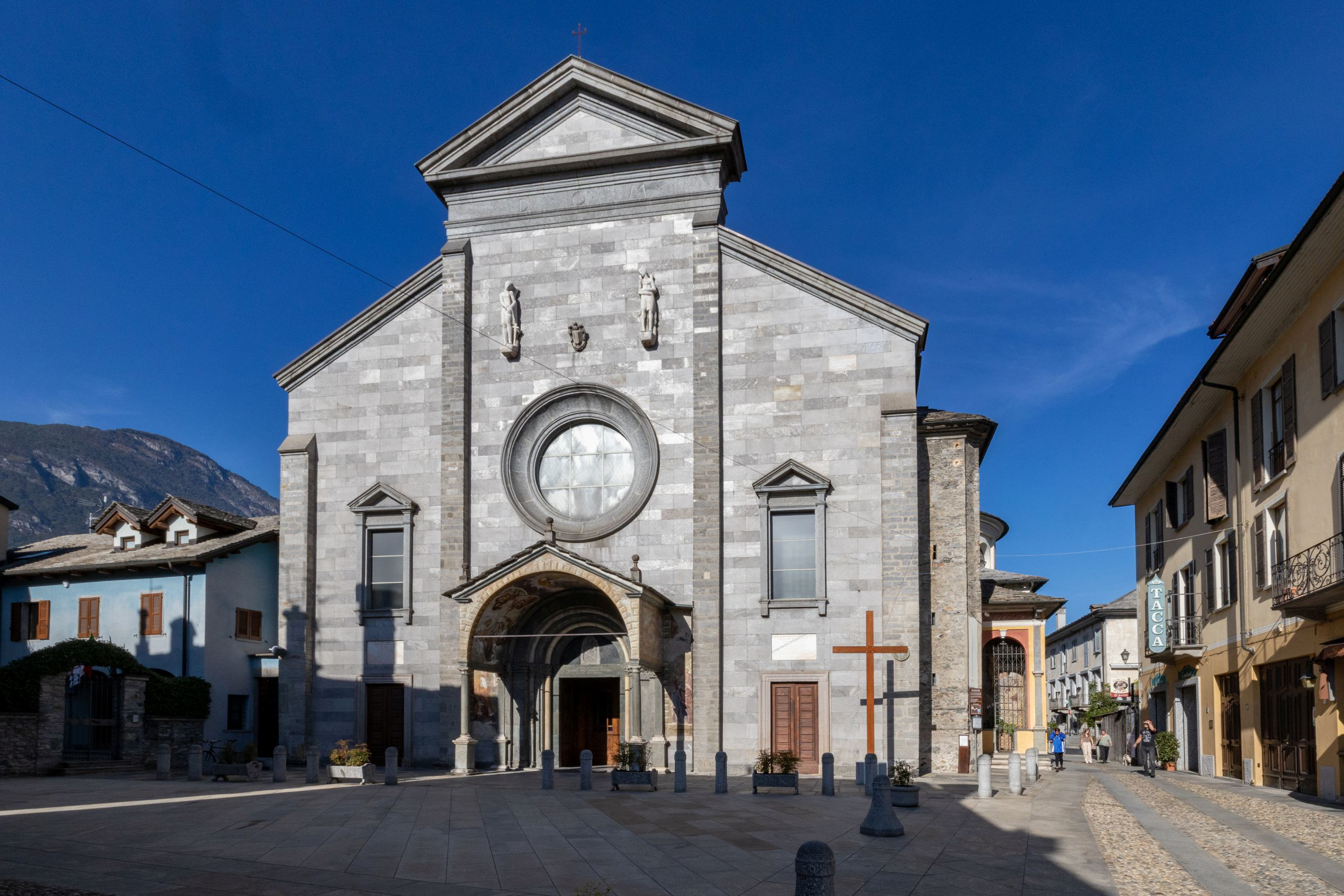
Collegiate church of Saints Gervasus and Protasus, the Domus to which Domodossola owes its name

In 1818, King Victor Emmanuel I made Domodossola the capital of the newly established Province of Ossola, which was abolished in 1859 and replaced by the circondario (district) of Ossola within the province of Novara.

In 1869, one of the first sections of the Italian Alpine Club was established in Domodossola. In 1906, with the opening of the Simplon Tunnel, Domodossola found itself once again on a major international route.

In 1910 the Peruvian aviation pioneer Jorge Chávez was fatally injured when he crashed upon landing in Domodossola after carrying the first air crossing of the Alps; he died a few days later in the San Biagio Hospital.

In the early 20th century, the economy of Domodossola flourished owing to growing industrialization and the building of numerous hydroelectric plants in the surrounding valleys; the population almost doubled between 1881 and 1921, owing to immigration from poorer regions of northern Italy such as Veneto and Romagna.

Flag of the Republic of Ossola

During World War II, following the German occupation of Italy and the establishment of the Italian Social Republic, Domodossola was liberated by the Italian Resistance forces on 10 September 1944, and became the capital of the Republic of Ossola, one of the largest partisan republics established in German-occupied northern Italy. The republic was crushed by German and Fascist forces on 23 October 1944, and many inhabitants fled to nearby Switzerland to escape reprisals; in 1945, the city flag was awarded the Gold Medal of Military Valor for its role in the Resistance.

During the 1950s and 1960s, the population of Domodossola grew further owing to immigration from southern Italy, especially Calabria; it peaked at over 20,000 inhabitants in 1981, but then slightly decreased in the following decades.

In 1992, Domodossola became part of the newly established province of Verbano-Cusio-Ossola.

== Landmarks ==
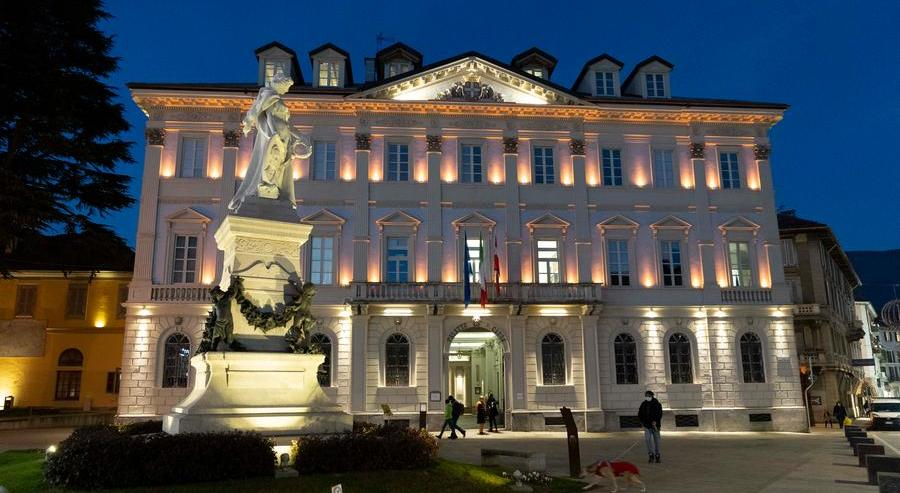
Palazzo di Città

Historic religious buildings of Domodossola include the Collegiate church of Saints Gervasius and Protasius, rebuilt between 1792 and 1798 on the remains of a more ancient church, which was probably the Domus that gave Domodossola its name; the Santuario della Madonna della Neve (devoted to Our Lady of the Snows), built in the first half of the 17th century; the Romanesque church of San Quirico, one of the most ancient churches in Ossola (11th century); and the equally ancient church of San Brizio, in the hamlet of Vagna, also in Romanesque style.

Civil buildings include the Palazzo Silva, built during the Renaissance by the condottiero Paolo dalla Silva; Palazzo Mellerio, built in the early 19th century, today seat of the municipal police; Palazzo San Francesco, built between the 13th and 19th century; Palazzo di Città, built in 1847, the municipal seat; and Collegio Mellerio-Rosmini, completed in 1874, which houses a library and a museum of natural sciences. Also noteworthy is the Domodossola railway station, designed by architect Luigi Boffi, built in 1888 and enlarged in 1906.

The most famous landmark of Domodossola, however, is the Sacro Monte Calvario, a site of pilgrimage and worship and a UNESCO world heritage site. The remains of the medieval castle of Mattarella lie on the same hill.

== Economy ==
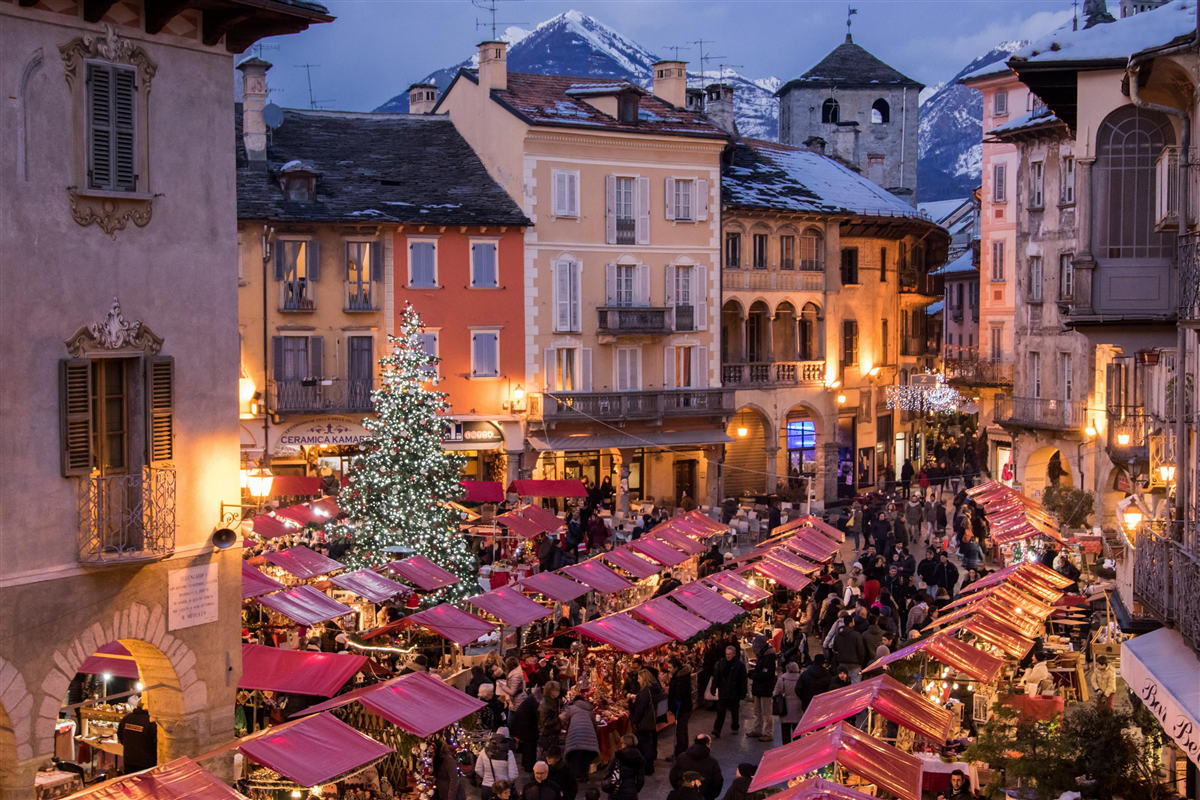
Christmas market in Piazza del Mercato

During the 20th century, the economy of Domodossola was centered on the industries, chiefly steel mills and mechanical industries, as well as the hydroelectric industry and marble and stone quarries.

In more recent years, the services sector has taken a more prominent role, along with tourism, owing to the Sacro Monte and the vicinity to parks such as the Val Grande National Park and the Alpe Veglia and Alpe Devero Natural Park, and ski resorts such as Domobianca and San Domenico di Varzo.

== Transport ==
Domodossola is the main railway hub in northern Piedmont, with over 1,400,000 travellers passing through it every year. Its strategic location accommodates Swiss rail passengers, and the Domodossola railway station acts as an international stopping point between Milan and Brig, Switzerland, through the Simplon Pass (Italian: Passo del Sempione). The Domodossola–Locarno railway is a 1,000 mm (3 ft 3 3/8 in) metre gauge line to the east across the border to Locarno.

Bus lines link Domodossola to the Malpensa International Airport, the provincial capital Verbania, the town of Omegna and the surrounding Alpine valleys.

== In popular culture ==
Its name is widely known in Italy as part of the local spelling alphabet as the entry: "D for Domodossola".

== Twin towns ==
- Brig, Switzerland
- Busto Arsizio, Italy

== See also ==
- Ossola
