= Regina Palace Hotel =

Hotel in Stresa, Italy

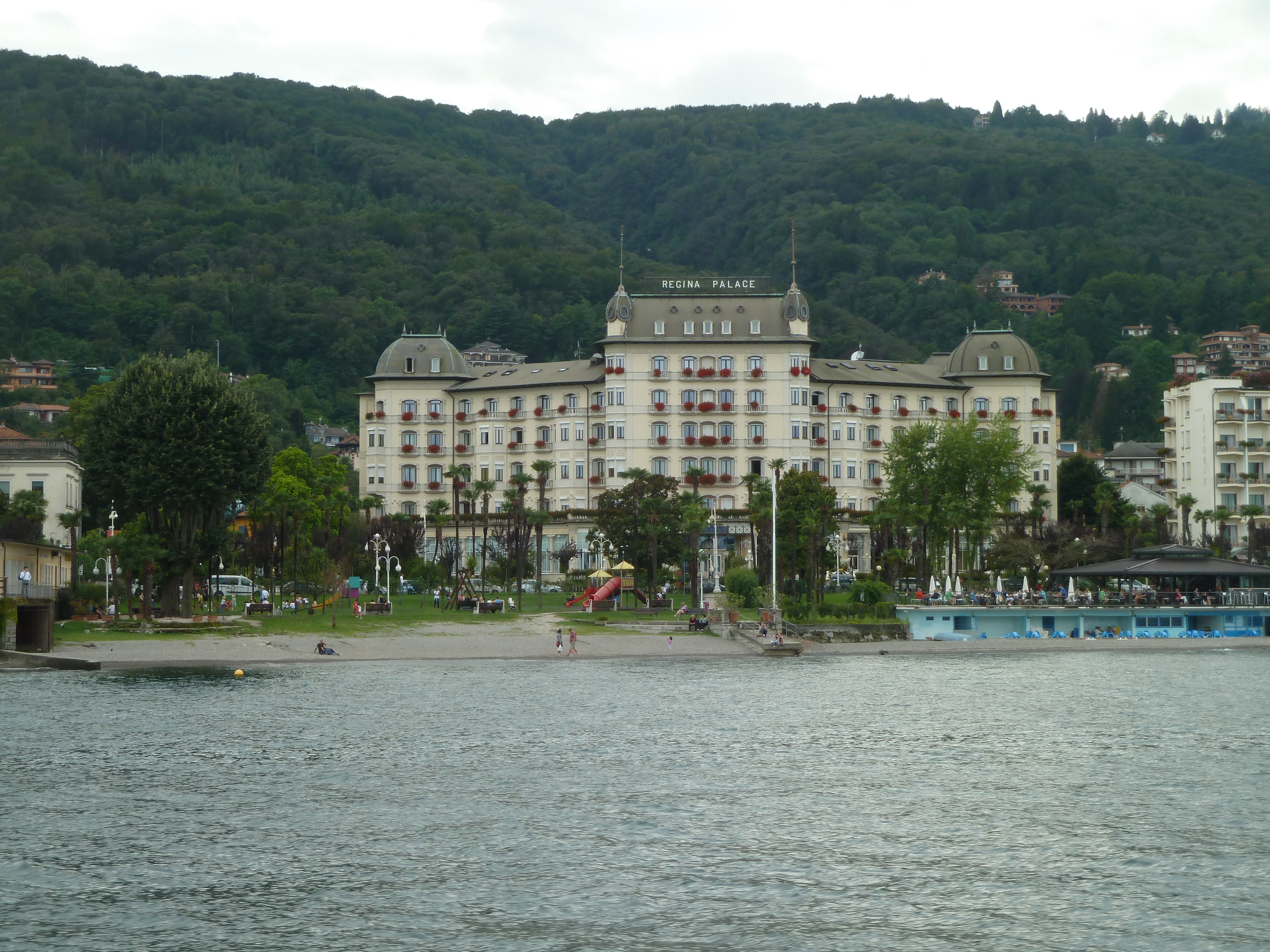
- The Regina Palace Hotel in 2014
- Interactive map of the Regina Palace Hotel area

General information
- Location: Stresa, Italy
- Coordinates: 45°53′05.55″N 8°32′13.76″E
- Opened: 1908; 118 years ago

The Regina Palace Hotel is a historic luxury hotel located on the shores of Lake Maggiore in Stresa, Italy.

== History ==
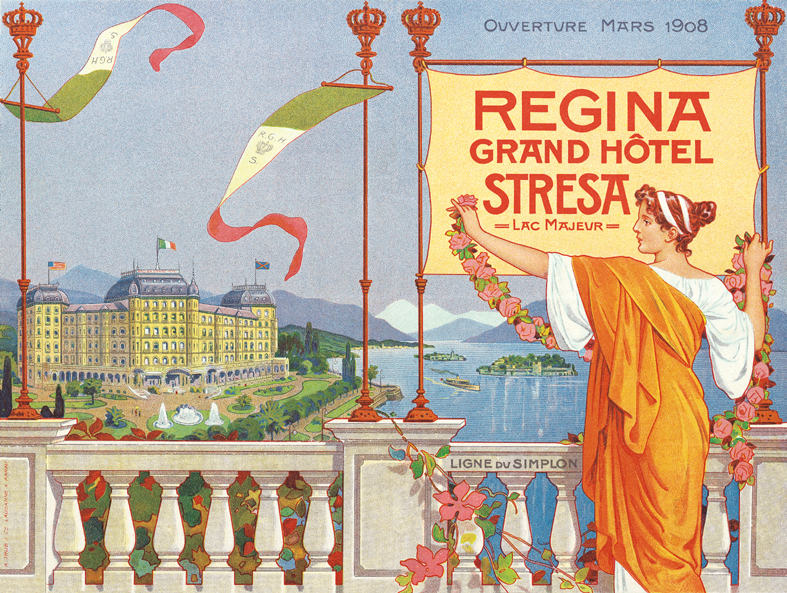
1908 inauguration advertisement

The hotel was inaugurated in 1908, after construction began in March 1907 to the design of Swiss architect Giuseppe Pagani. Its creation was promoted by the Società Anonima Italiana per gli Alberghi del Lago Maggiore, founded in Milan on 12 December 1906 by local families, entrepreneurs, and noble vacationers. In January 1907 the company acquired Villa De Martini, an 1849 residence by architect Alessandro Ghezzi which was demolished shortly thereafter to clear the site for the new hotel. From its opening, the Regina Palace became a Belle Époque landmark on Lake Maggiore, attracting distinguished guests.

Over the decades, it hosted royalty, artists, and writers, and was the venue for major events such as the conference leading to the creation of the Stresa Front in 1935 and the first Miss Italy contest in 1946.

== See also ==
- Grand Hotel des Iles Borromées
