= Varzo railway station =

Railway station in Varzo, Piedmont, Italy

Varzo
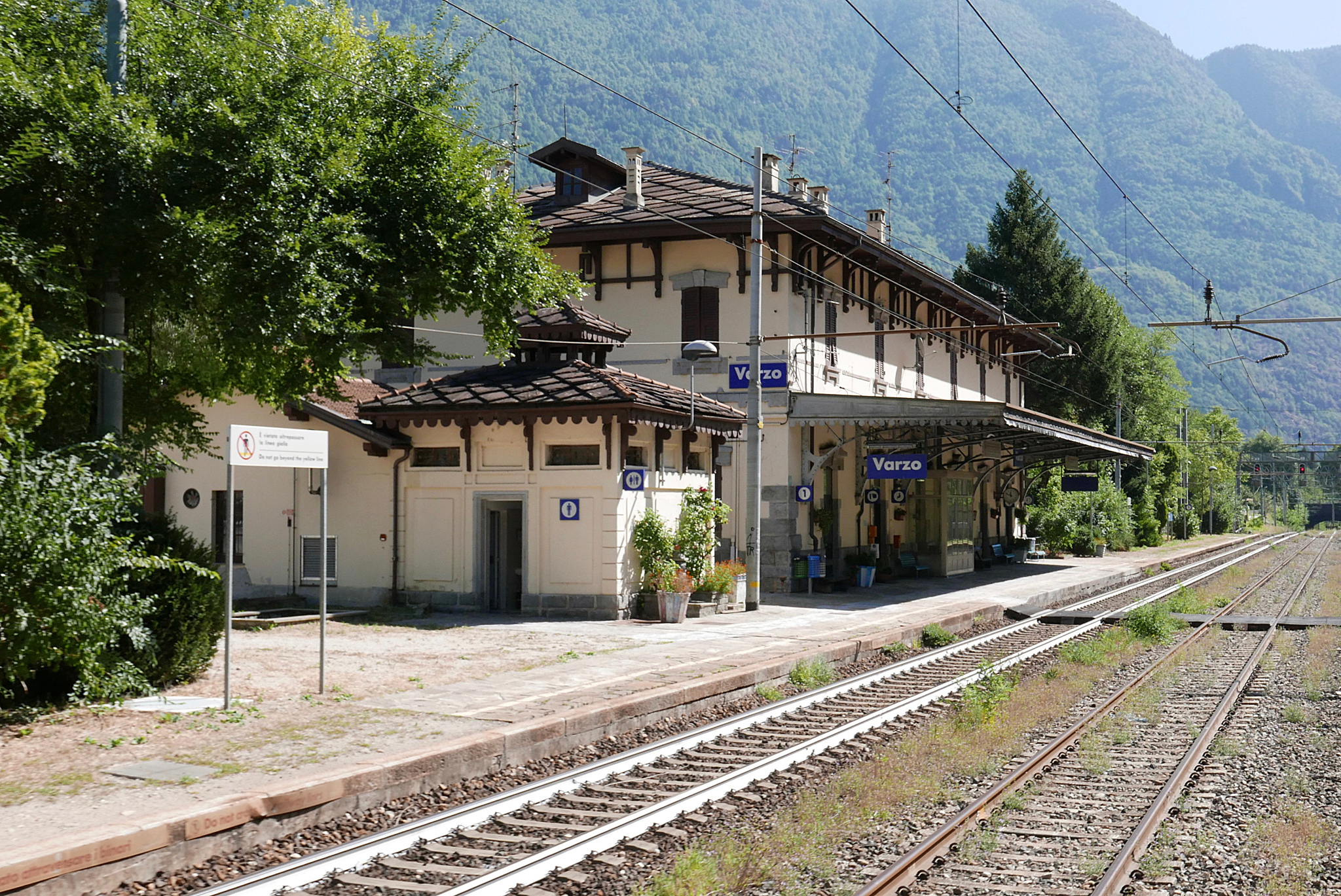
- The station in 2016

General information
- Location: Varzo; Italy
- Coordinates: 46°12′23″N 8°14′43″E
- Owner: Rete Ferroviaria Italiana
- Line: Simplon line
- Distance: 12.6 km (7.8 mi) from Domodossola
- Platforms: 2
- Tracks: 3
- Train operators: BLS AG

Construction
- Accessible: No

Other information
- Station code: 8302813; 8501951 (VAR)

Services
Preceding station	BLS	Following station
Iselle di Trasquera towards Bern	RE1	Preglia towards Domodossola
Location
- Location within Piedmont Location within Northern Italy Location within Italy

Varzo railway station (Italian: Stazione di Varzo) is a railway station in the comune of Varzo, in the Italian region of Piedmont. It is an intermediate stop on the standard gauge Simplon line of Rete Ferroviaria Italiana.

== Services ==
The following services stop at Varzo:

- RegioExpress: service every two hours between Bern and Domodossola, increasing to hourly during rush-hour.
