= Preglia railway station =

Italian railway station

Preglia
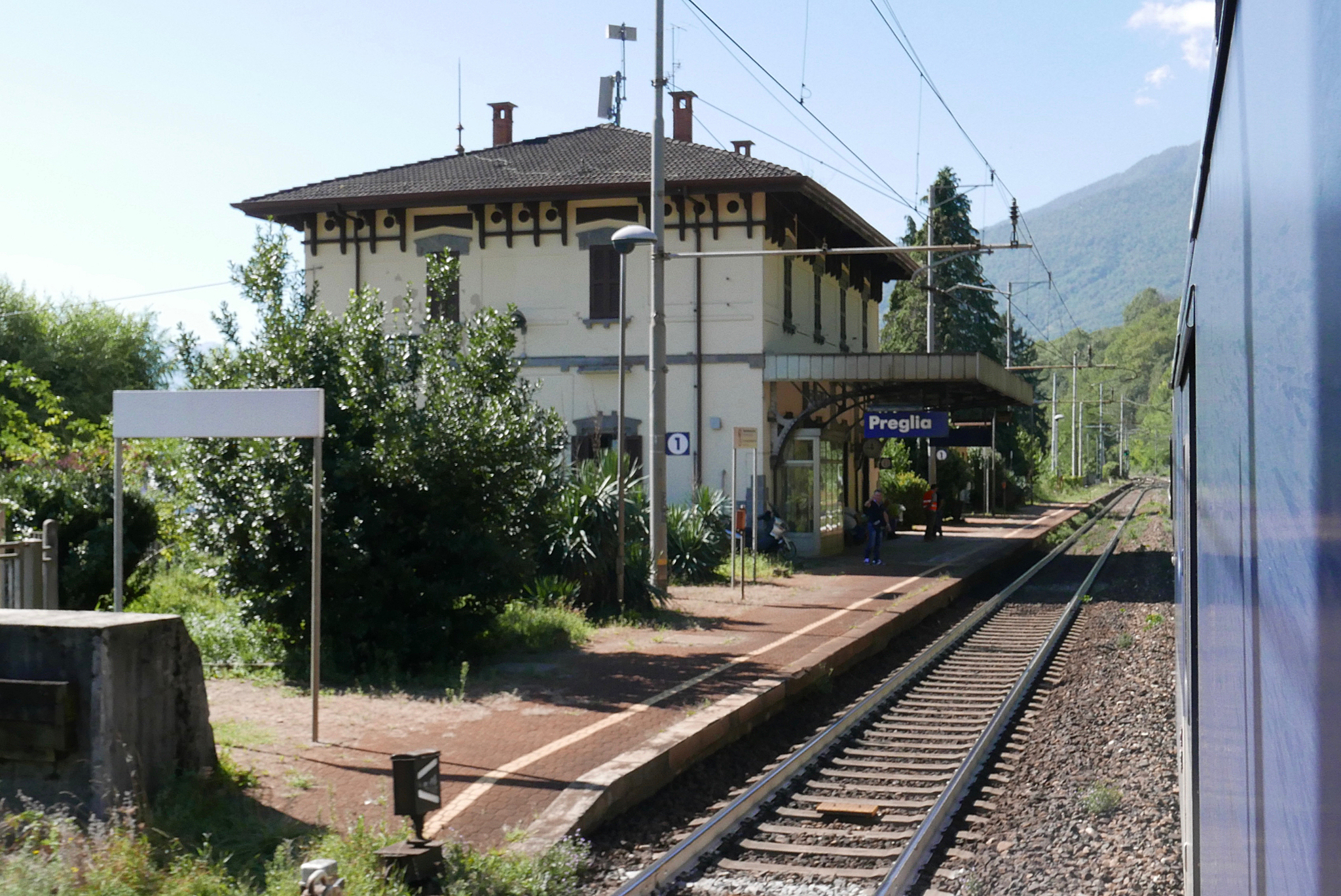
- The station in 2016

General information
- Location: Crevoladossola; Italy
- Coordinates: 46°08′44″N 8°17′34″E
- Owner: Rete Ferroviaria Italiana
- Line: Simplon line
- Distance: 3.8 km (2.4 mi) from Domodossola
- Platforms: 2
- Tracks: 2
- Train operators: BLS AG

Construction
- Accessible: No

Other information
- Station code: 8302812; 8501950 (PRE)

Services
Preceding station	BLS	Following station
Varzo towards Bern	RE1	Domodossola Terminus
Location
- Location within Piedmont Location within Northern Italy Location within Italy

Preglia railway station (Italian: Stazione di Preglia) is a railway station in the comune of Crevoladossola, in the Italian region of Piedmont. It is an intermediate stop on the standard gauge Simplon line of Rete Ferroviaria Italiana.

== Services ==
The following services stop at Preglia:

- RegioExpress: service every two hours between Bern and Domodossola, increasing to hourly during rush-hour.
