= Palazzo Silva, Domodossola =

Coordinates: 04°08′N 41°10′E

Palazzo Silva
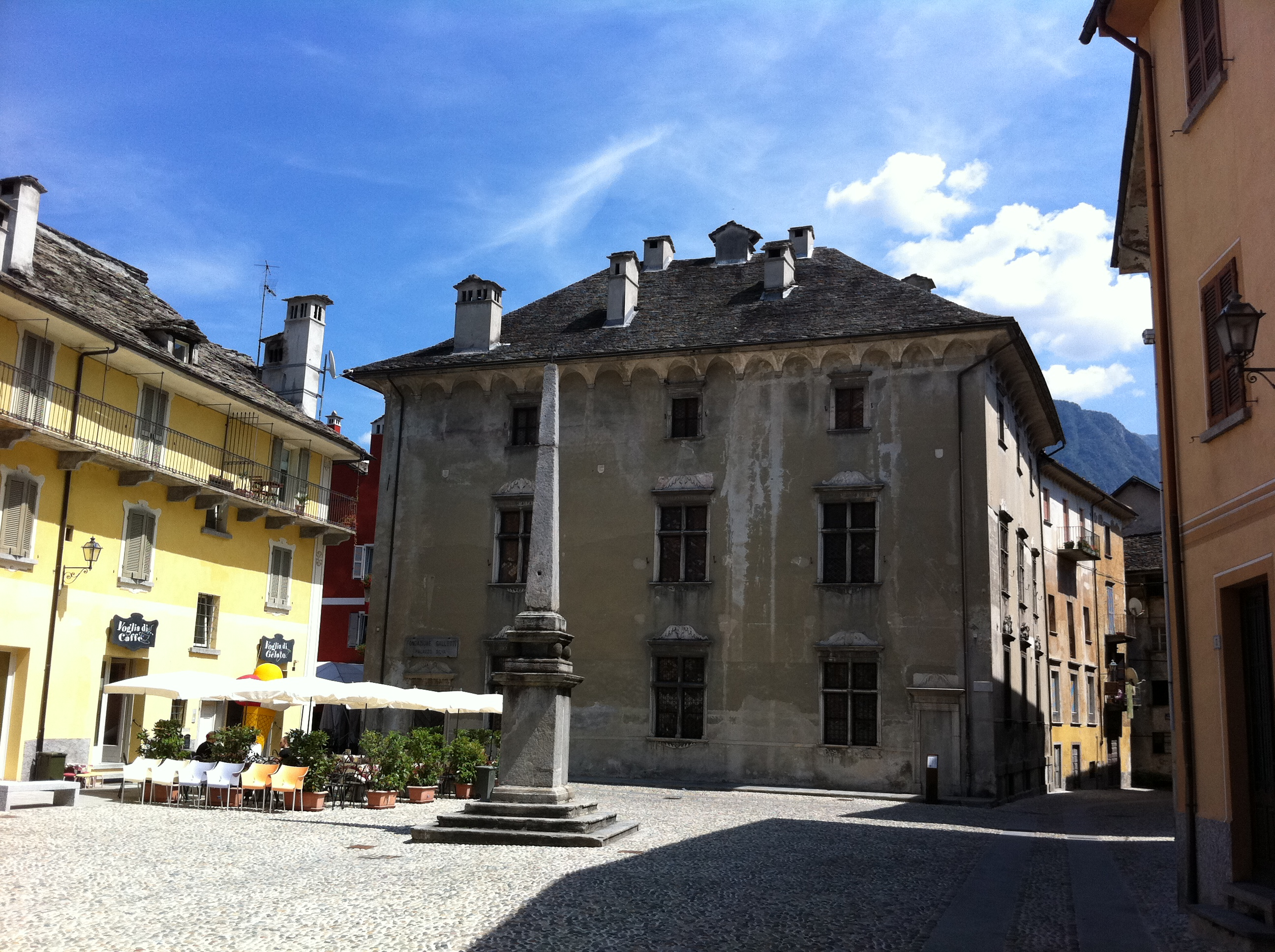
- The palace and obelisk of Piazza Chiossi
- Interactive map of the Palazzo Silva area

General information
- Architectural style: Renaissance
- Location: Domodossola, Italy

Technical details
- Structural system: Brick

Palazzo Silva is a Renaissance-style building in Domodossola, region of Piedmont, Italy and houses a museum. It is located on the Via Accademia delle Scienze.

== History ==
An older residence prior to the 14th century, it was refurbished, starting in 1416 by Giovanni Antonio Della Silva, the father of the condottiero Paolo della Silva, who fought in the service of King Francis I of France. Paolo continued the refurbishment. The Silva family had formerly populated the rural castle of Crevoladossola, and this now represented its urban palace. The work continued until 1620 under Guglielmo Silva. The palace remained in the family until the 18th century. It was bought in 1882 by the Fondazione Galletti and converted into a museum, which was donated to the Commune.

It remains a civic museum housing an eclectic collection of local artworks, furniture, sundry archeologic collections, and historic armor and weapons. The collection includes a 19th-century Japanese suit of armor, Roman and other antiquities, and works of art.
