= Luigi Boffi =

Italian architect

Luigi Boffi (1846 in Binago – 1904 in Milan) was an Italian architect.

He was born in Monello, a frazione of Binago, near Varese, in Lombardy. He trained at the Accademia delle Belle Arti of Milan. He won the Contest of Vittadini in Milan for the design of a marketplace; next, he won a prize from the Accademia for the Oggioni stipend, which allowed him to set up his own studio. He also entered the contests to design the Monument of the Cinque Giornate di Milano (1884, ultimately assigned to Giuseppe Grandi) and the Monument to Vittorio Emanuele II in Rome (1882, for which he won second prize). He also designed the Ossuary at Custoza.

In Turin, he won a prize from the College of Architects and Engineers for his reliefs (1876) on the Renaissance Palazzo Vitelleschi in Corneto Tarquinia. This work was accompanied by a publication describing the history of the Palazzo. Boffi won honourable mention at the 1878 Esposizione Universale of Paris, and was named an honorary associate of the Academy of Fine Arts of Milan. While in Milan, he also helped in the design and construction of Villino Lessa in Canobbio; the Villino Torelli in Chiffa; the Villino Buoni in Stresa; and the Villino Cattaneo in Gignese. He also presented a novel design for the facade of the Cathedral of Milan (1887), which while praised was never built. It contained a central tower with a large ogival window and three doorways.

The Saint Leger family commissioned from him the landscaping and further development of two islands in Lago Maggiore near Brissago, Switzerland. Boffi also designed the International train station at Domodossola (on the Swiss border), built posthumously (1905-1906).

Boffi while academic and grounded in classical design, had a flair for the dramatic and romantic. Many of his projects were published in Florence in Ricordi di Architettura.

He was buried in Binago in an Egyptian-style tomb designed by himself.
