= Simplon Tunnel =

Tunnel between Italy and Switzerland

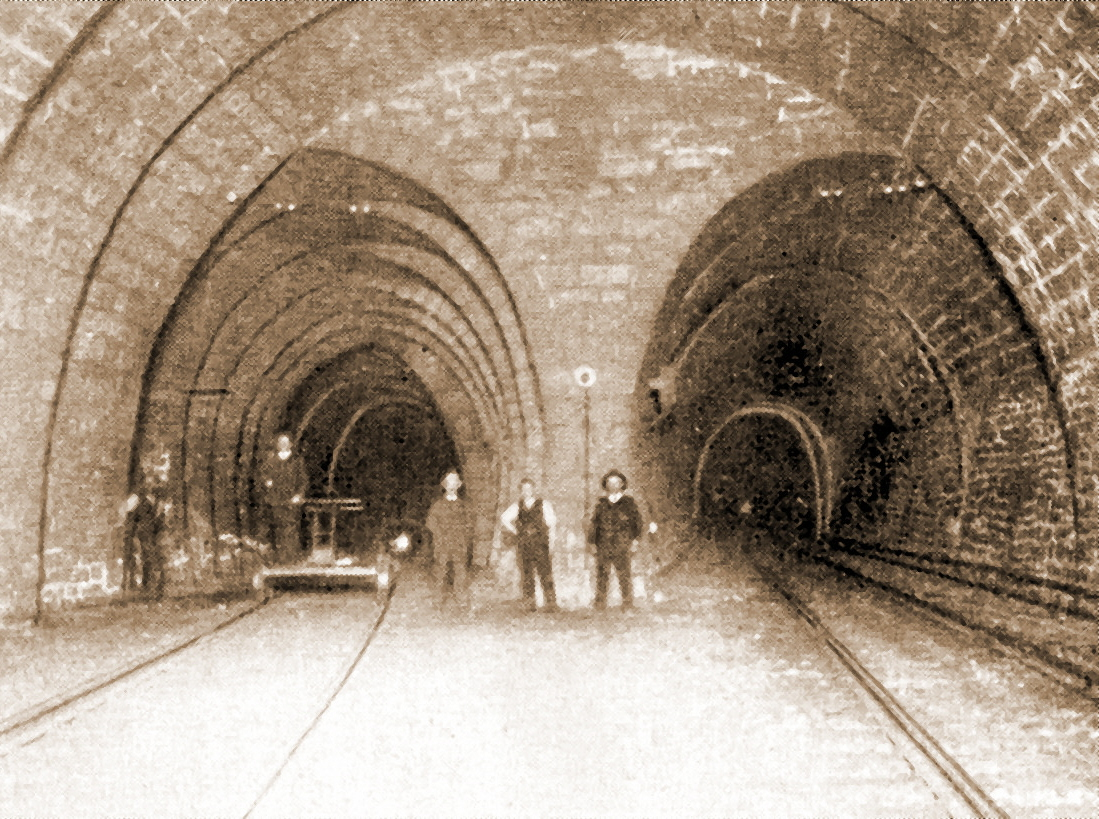
- Passing loop

Overview
- Official name: German: Simplontunnel, Italian: Galleria del Sempione
- Line: Simplon line, (Lötschberg railway line)
- Location: Traversing the Lepontine Alps between Switzerland and Italy
- Coordinates: 46.324°N 8.007°E – 46.207°N 8.201°E
- System: Swiss Federal Railways (SBB CFF FFS)
- Crosses: Lepontine Alps (Wasenhorn massif)
- Start: Brig, canton of Valais, Switzerland 683 m (2,241 ft)
- End: Iselle di Trasquera, Piedmont, Italy 633 m (2,077 ft)

Operation
- Work began: 22 November 1898; 127 years ago (east tunnel), 1912 (west tunnel)
- Opened: 19 May 1906 (east tunnel), 1921 (west tunnel)
- Owner: SBB CFF FFS
- Operator: SBB CFF FFS
- Traffic: Railway
- Character: Passenger, Freight, Car Transport
- Vehicles per day: Passenger: 70, Freight: unknown

Technical
- Length: 19.803 km (12.305 mi) (east tunnel), 19.823 km (12.317 mi) (west tunnel)
- No. of tracks: Two single-track tubes
- Track gauge: 1,435 mm (4 ft 8 1/2 in) standard gauge
- Electrified: since 1 June 1906, 15 kV 16.7 Hz since 2 March 1930
- Operating speed: 160 km/h (Passenger trains) 120 km/h (Car shuttles)
- Max elevation: 705 m (2,313 ft)
- Min elevation: 633 m (2,077 ft) (south portal)
- Grade: 2–7 ‰

The Simplon Tunnel (Simplontunnel, Traforo del Sempione or Galleria del Sempione) is a railway tunnel on the Simplon railway that connects Brig, Switzerland and Domodossola, Italy, through the Alps, providing a shortcut under the Simplon Pass route. It is straight except for short curves at either end. It consists of two single-track tunnels built nearly 15 years apart. The first tunnel is 19,803 m (64,970 ft) long; the last tunnel is 19,824 m (65,039 ft) long, making it the longest railway tunnel in the world for most of the twentieth century, from 1906 until 1982, when the Daishimizu Tunnel opened.

Peaking at a height of only 705 m (2,313 ft) above sea level, the Simplon Tunnel was also the lowest direct Alpine crossing for 110 years, until the opening of the Gotthard Base Tunnel in 2016. The tunnel has a maximum rock overlay of approximately 2,150 m (7,050 ft), also a world record at the time. Temperatures up to 56 °C (133 °F) have been measured inside the tunnel.

Work on the first tube of the Simplon Tunnel commenced in 1898. The Italian king Victor Emmanuel III of Italy and the president of the Swiss Confederation (presiding the Federal Council of Switzerland for that year) Ludwig Forrer opened the tunnel at Brig on 19 May 1906. The builders of the tunnel were Hermann Häustler and Hugo von Kager. Work on the second tube of the tunnel started in 1912 and was opened in 1921.

== History ==
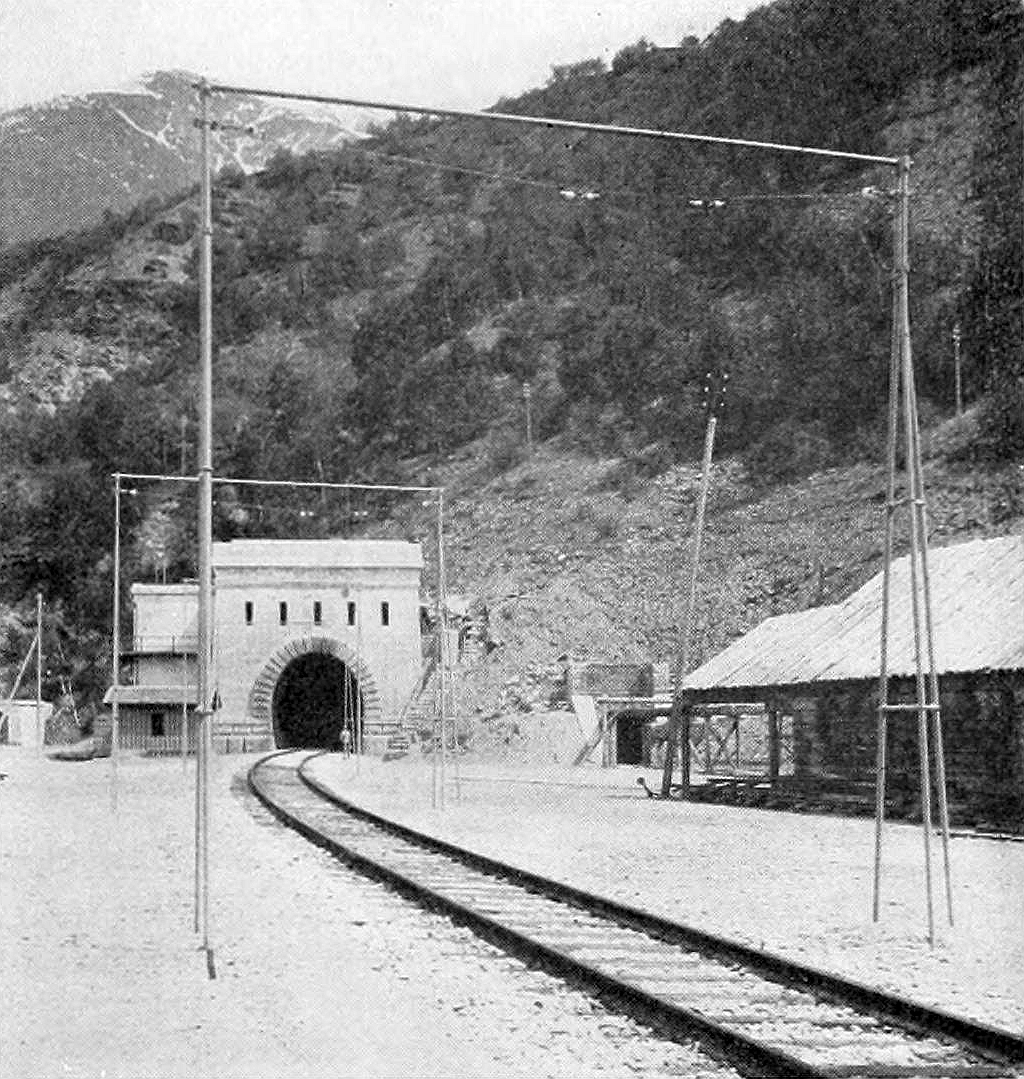
Simplon Tunnel, 1906

Shortly after the opening of the first railway in Switzerland, each region began to favour a separate north–south link through the Alps towards Italy. Eastern Switzerland supported a line through the Splügen Pass or the Lukmanier Pass, Central Switzerland and Zürich favoured the Gotthard Pass and Western Switzerland supported the Simplon route.

In 1871, the first line through the Alps was completed, connecting Italy and France by means of the Fréjus Rail Tunnel.

The Compagnie de la Ligne d'Italie was founded in 1856 to build a connection between Romandy and Italy through the Canton of Valais and the Simplon. On 1 June 1874, it was taken over by the Simplon Company (French: Compagnie du Simplon, S), which was created to promote the project. This merged in 1881 with the company Western Swiss Railways (French: Chemins de Fer de la Suisse Occidentale, SO) to create the Western Switzerland–Simplon Company (French: Compagnie de la Suisse Occidentale et du Simplon, SOS). The French financiers of the SOS were able to secure financing for the tunnel in 1886. The company considered 31 proposals and selected one that involved the construction of a tunnel from Glis to Gondo, which would have been fully in Switzerland. From Gondo it would have continued on a ramp through the Divedro valley down to Domodossola.

At a Swiss-Italian conference held in July 1889, it was agreed, however, to build a nearly 20 km-long (12 mi) base tunnel through the territory of both states. To secure credit for the tunnel, the SOS joined with the Jura–Bern–Luzern Railway to create the Jura–Simplon Railway (French: Compagnie du Jura–Simplon, SOS).

The participation of the Swiss government led to the signing of a treaty with Italy on November 25, 1895 concerning the construction and operation of a railway through the Simplon from Brig to Domodossola by the Jura–Simplon Railway. The route of the tunnel was determined by military considerations, so that the state border between the two countries was in the middle of the tunnel, allowing either country to block the tunnel in the event of war.

On 1 May 1903, the Jura-Simplon Railway was nationalized and integrated into the network of the Swiss Federal Railways (SBB), which completed the construction of the tunnel.

=== Construction ===
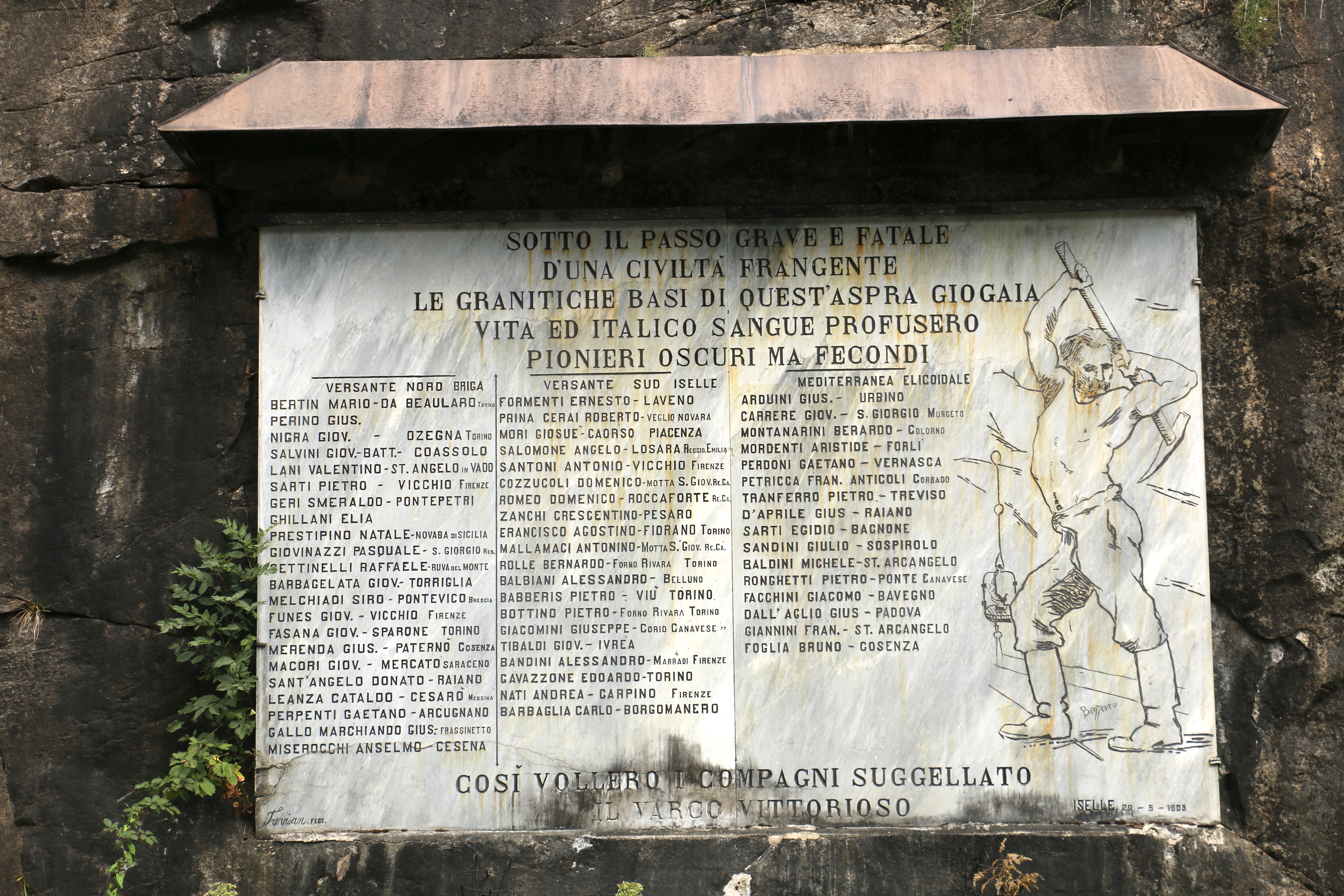
A monument in memory of the deceased workers of the Simplon Tunnel was erected next to the Iselle di Trasquera railway station on 29 May 1905.

The construction of the tunnel was carried out by the Hamburg engineering company Brandt & Brandau, of Karl Brandau and Alfred Brandt. On average, 3,000 people per day worked on the site. They were mostly Italians, who suffered under very poor working conditions: 67 workers were killed in accidents; many died later of diseases. During the work, there were strikes, which led to the intervention of vigilantes and the Swiss army.

With up to 2,150 m (7,054 ft) of rock over the tunnel, temperatures of up to 42 °C (108 °F) were expected. Therefore, a new building method was developed. In addition to the single-line main tunnel, a parallel tunnel was built, with the tunnel centres separated by 17 m (56 ft), through which pipes supplied fresh air to the builders in the main tunnel. It was envisaged that the parallel tunnel could be upgraded to a second running tunnel when required. The first Simplon Tunnel (19,803 m (64,970 ft) in length) was built almost straight, with only short curves at the two tunnel portals.

On 24 February 1905, the two halves of the tunnel came together. They were out of alignment by only 202 mm (8 in) horizontally and 87 mm (3.4 in) vertically. Construction time was 7 1/2 years, rather than 5 1/2 years, due to problems such as water inflows and strikes.

Art Nouveau Silver Medallion by Giannino Castiglioni for the Milan International Exhibition 1906. The South Portal of the Simplon Tunnel is on the obverse.

=== Electrification and operation ===
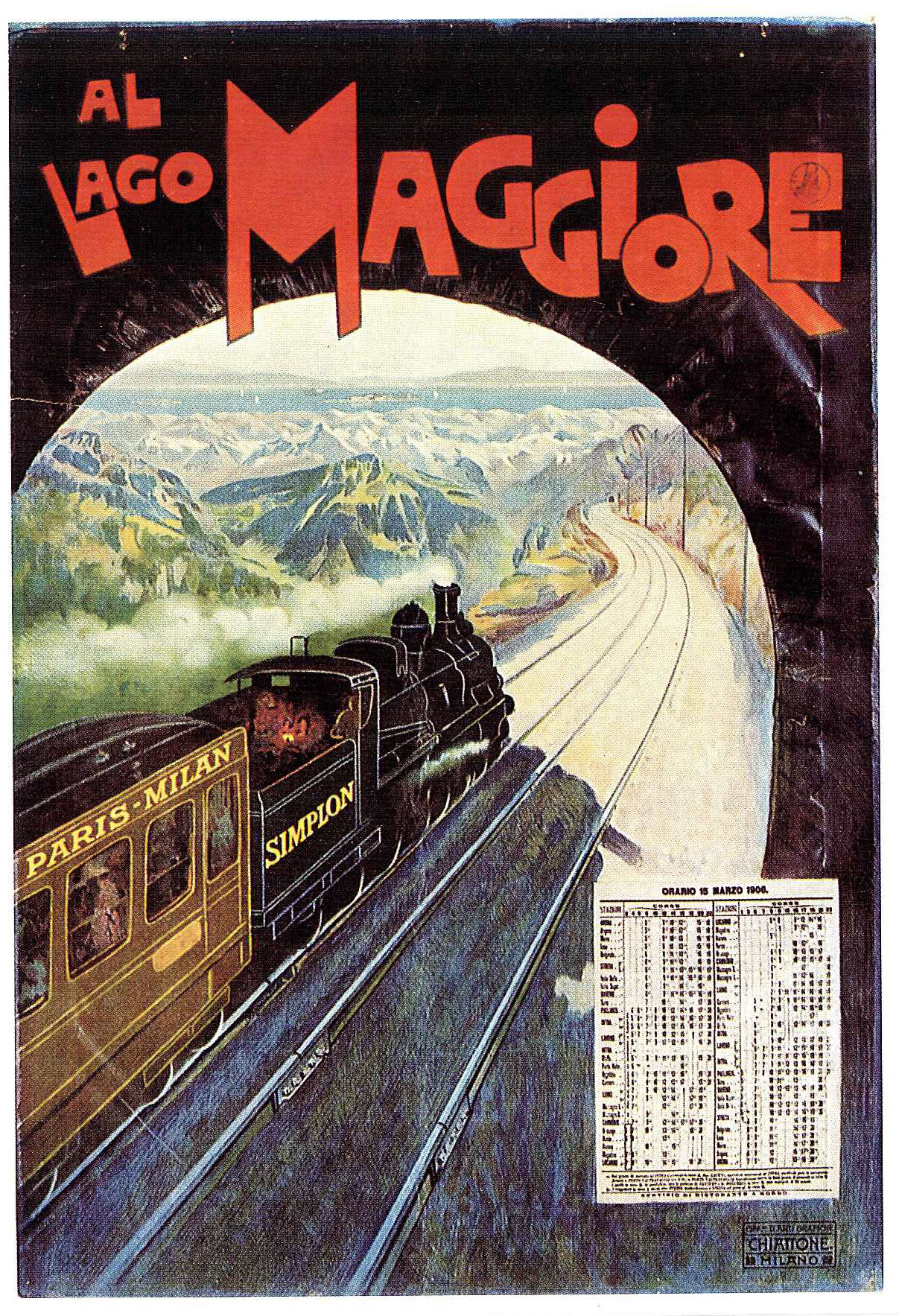
Old poster for the train between Paris and Milan (from 1908, two years after opening. Note the double-tracked depiction – in reality, a second single-track tunnel only opened in 1912).

Operations commenced through the tunnel on 19 May 1906. Because of its length among other things, it has operated with electric traction rather than steam from the beginning. The official decision to use electricity was made only half a year before its opening by the then-still-new SBB. Brown, Boveri & Cie (BBC) were commissioned to carry out the electrification. They decided in 1904 to use the three-phase system being introduced in Italy, with a three-phase power supply of 3,400 volts at 15.8 Hz using two overhead wires with the track acting as the third conductor. BBC had no electric locomotives and initially acquired three locomotives built for the Ferrovia della Valtellina—the owner of the lines from Colico to Chiavenna and Tirano, which had been electrified with this system in 1901 and 1902—from their owner, the Rete Adriatica (Adriatic Network) railway company. These three locomotives (which became FS Class E.360) hauled all traffic through the tunnel until 1908. On 2 March 1930, the Simplon tunnel was converted to 15 kV, 16.7 Hz AC (single-phase).

=== Expansion ===
Between 1912 and 1921, the 19,823 m-long (65,036 ft) second tube, known as Simplon II, was built. On 7 January 1922 the northern section from the northern portal to the 500 m-long (1,640 ft) passing loop in the middle of the tunnel was brought into operation, followed on 16 October 1922 by the southern section from the passing loop to the southern portal.

=== Second World War ===
During the Second World War, on both sides of the border, there were preparations for the possible detonation of the tunnels. In Italy, the German army planned, as part of its 1945 withdrawal, to blow up the tunnel, but was thwarted by Italian partisans with the help of two Swiss officials and Austrian deserters.

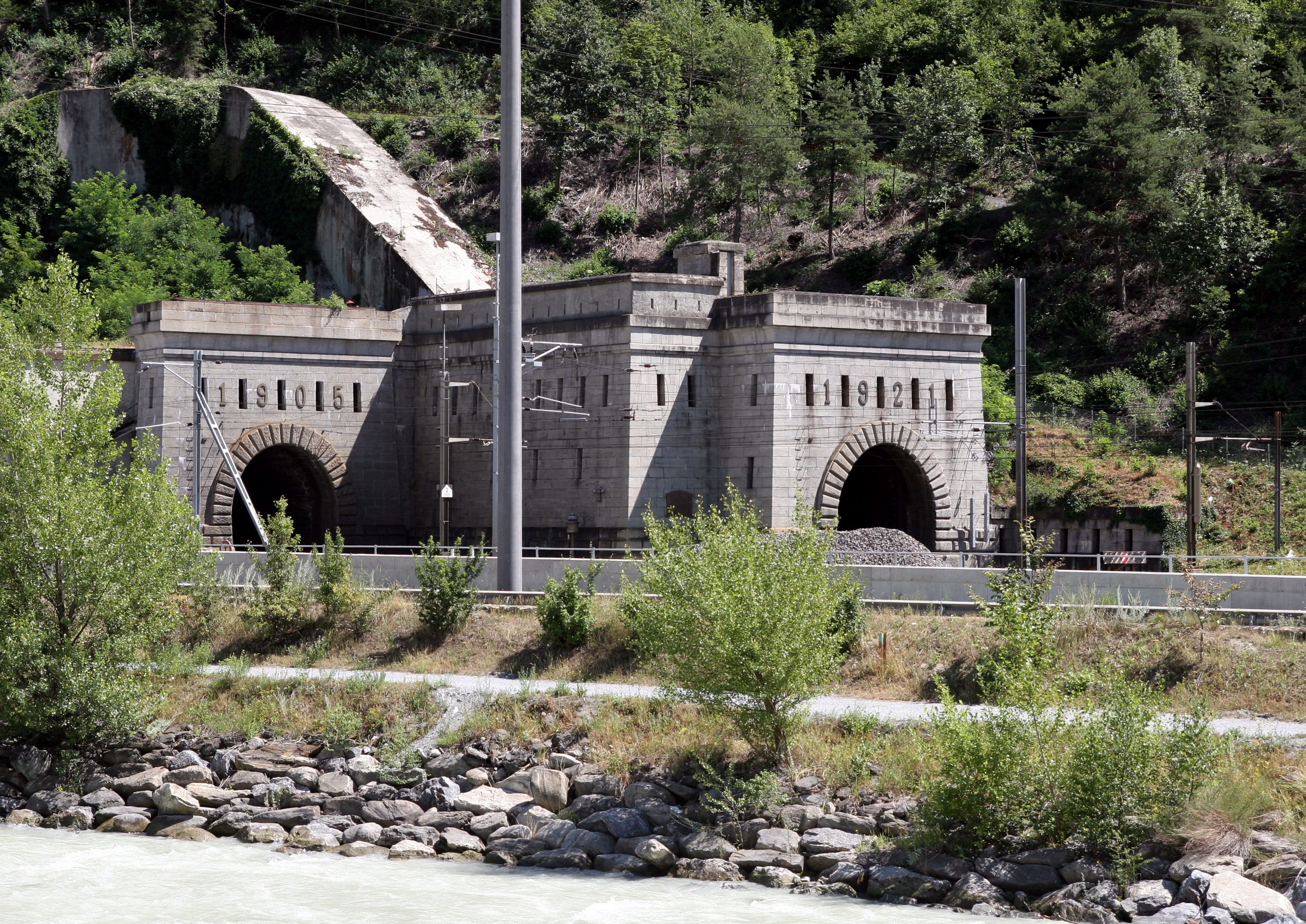
North portal

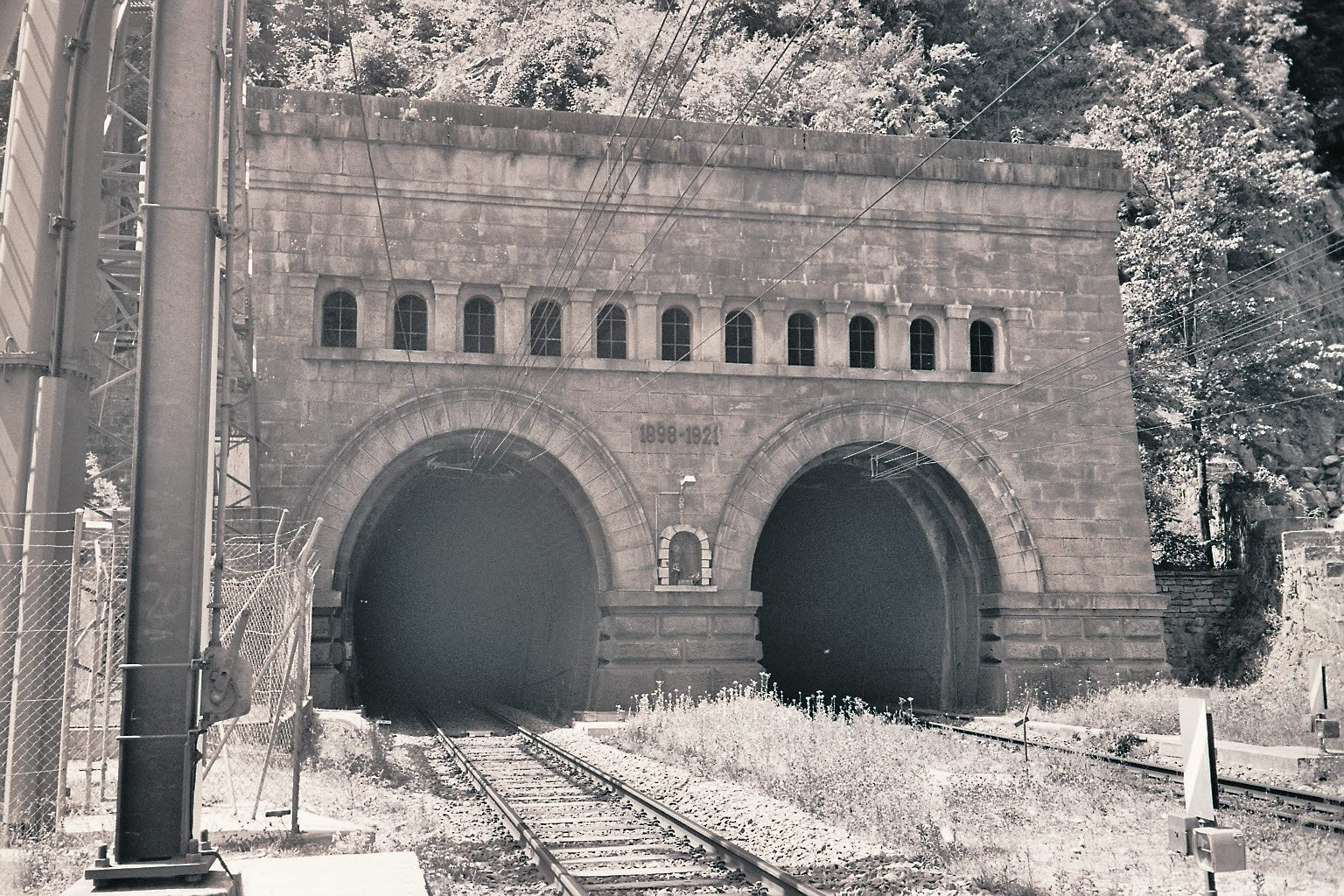
South portal

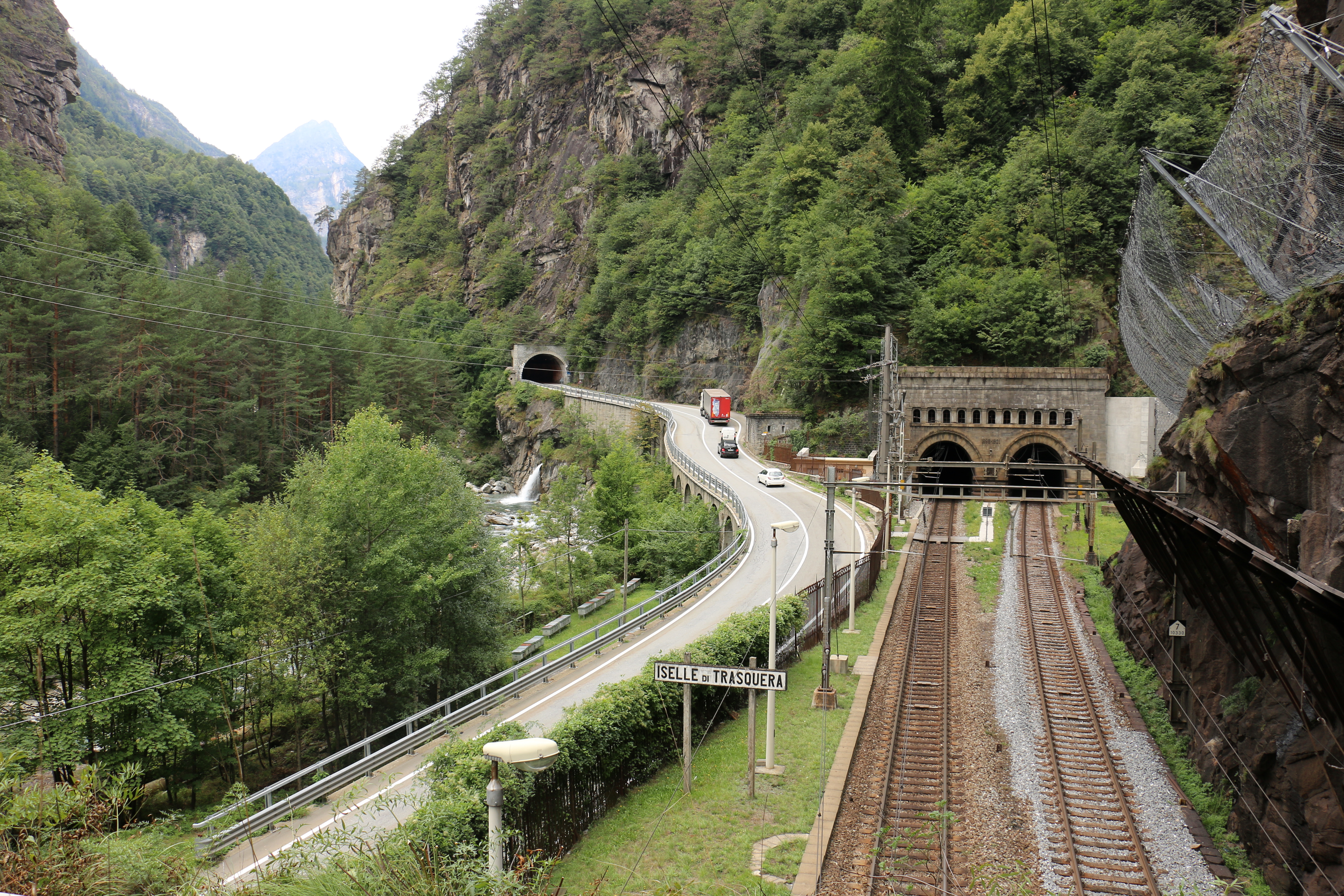
South portal at Iselle di Trasquera railway station. The picture was taken through a loophole of an old Italian World War II bunker. The bunker's weapons were directed to the tunnel's south portal.

== Present and future ==
=== Car-carrying shuttle trains ===
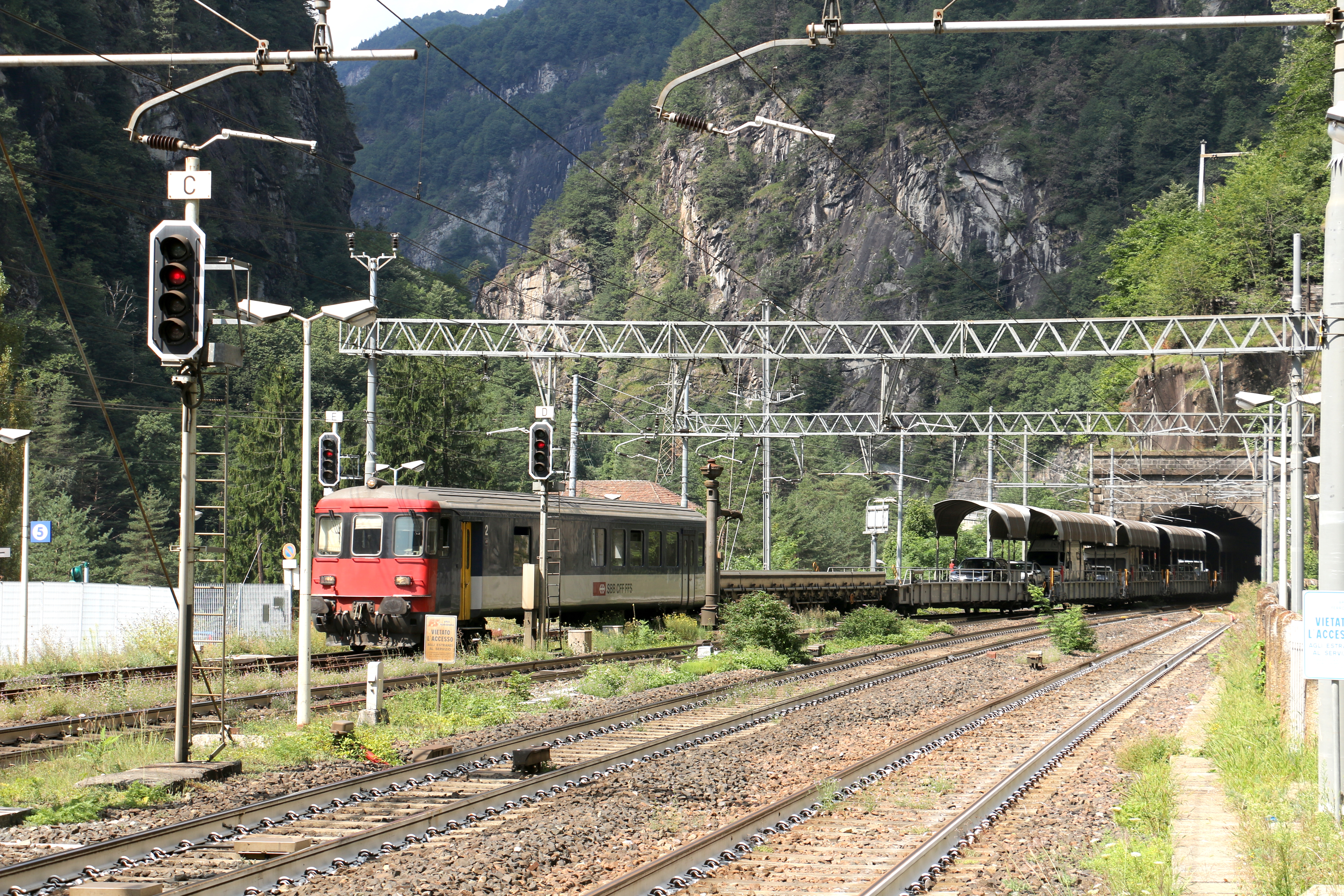
A car transport train arriving in Iselle di Trasquera railway station

There is a car-carrying shuttle between Brig and Iselle di Trasquera, which provides a 20-minute train journey as an alternative to driving over the Simplon Pass. The service began on 1 December 1959. As roads over the Simplon Pass steadily improved throughout the 1970s and 1980s the tunnel's shuttle schedule was cut back, then ended altogether on 3 January 1993. Almost twelve years later, on 12 December 2004, the car shuttle service was restarted and now runs approximately every 90 minutes.

=== Piggyback transport ===
In the early 1990s, a project to implement the rolling highway system of piggyback operations for transalpine freight on the Lötschberg–Simplon axis was implemented. Such operations were possible under the previous profile of the Simplon Tunnel, but the capacity would have been heavily restricted because its height was too low to carry trucks at the permitted maximum corner height of 4 m (13 ft 1 in). The clearance in the tunnel was therefore increased by lowering the rail trackbed. This work began in 1995 and lasted eight years. At the same time, the tunnel vault was rehabilitated, while the drainage tunnel was rebuilt. A total of 200,000 m^{3} (260,000 cu yd) of rock was removed with pneumatic breakers.

In addition, a new railway electrification system was installed using overhead electric rail instead of the tensioned cable normally used for overhead electrification so that the required 4.90 m (16 ft 1 in) height clearance could be achieved. In the late 1980s, a one km (0.62 mi) long overhead electric rail had been tested at 160 km/h (99 mph). Before this experiment, trains running under overhead electric rails in Switzerland had been limited to 110 km/h (68 mph) and internationally to 80 km/h (50 mph).

Restricted rail operations were maintained during the entire construction period.

=== Expansion of access routes ===
In order to increase transit capacity in the Lötschberg-Simplon axis, various extensions to the access lines (from Bern and Lausanne in the north and from Novara and Milan in the south) have been made in recent years and decades. The largest projects have upgraded the northern access from Basel-Bern via the Lötschberg. Between 1976 and 2007 there were three major transformations. First, the remaining single-track line between Spiez and Brig was doubled. Later, the tunnel profile was expanded to allow piggyback traffic; in places only widening one track was possible. Finally, the Lötschberg Base Tunnel partially opened in 2007, although the new tunnel still has a 21 km (13 mi) single-track section; this was done to save costs for the construction of the longer Gotthard Base Tunnel, which was completed in 2016.

Clearances were also raised for the piggyback traffic on the Italian side as well as on the Simplon southern approach. Here too, for financial reasons, at times only one line was cleared for the rolling highway. South of Domodossola, the single line to Novara via Lake Orta was electrified and modernized.

The classic approach to the Simplon from Paris and Lausanne—less important for today's transit traffic—was upgraded in the context of a nationwide rail upgrading project, Rail 2000, between 1985 and 2004. Further improvements are proposed. In November 2004, the 7 km-long (4.3 mi) new line between Salgesch and Leuk in the Rhône valley was completed to replace the last single-track bottleneck on the route. Under the ZEB ("Future rail development projects") package, the maximum speed on the long straight sections of the Rhône valley lines will be increased from 160 to 200 km/h (99 to 124 mph).

=== 2011 fire ===
On 9 June 2011, a 300 m (984 ft) section of the Simplon II tunnel's roof was seriously damaged when a northbound BLS freight train caught fire and stopped 3 km (1.9 mi) inside the tunnel. The temperature exceeded 800 °C (1,470 °F) and took more than two weeks to cool back to normal. By agreement, all repairs to the tunnels are the responsibility of the SBB, which expected to reopen the tunnel in December 2011. The other tunnel remained in service.

Repair work was completed in November 2011.

== Facts and figures ==
- Length of tunnel I: 19,803 m (12.305 mi)
- Length of tunnel II: 19,823 m (12.317 mi)
- Elevation at north portal, Brig: 685.80 m (2,250.0 ft)
- Elevation at crest of the tunnel: 704.98 m (2,312.9 ft)
- Elevation at south portal, Iselle: 633.48 m (2,078.3 ft)
- Gradient on north side: 2 ‰
- Gradient on south side: 7 ‰ (1 in 143)
- Maximum rock overlay: 2,150 m (7,050 ft) (below the Tunnelspitz of the Wasenhorn massif)
- Start of construction on north side: 22 November 1898
- Start of construction of south side: 21 December 1898
- Breakthrough: 24 February 1905
- Inauguration: 19 May 1906
- First electrical operation: 1 June 1906

== In popular media ==
In the 1957 novel From Russia, with Love by Ian Fleming, protagonist James Bond fights his enemy, SMERSH agent Donovan Grant, eventually killing him, while passing through the Simplon Tunnel on the Orient Express.

In Against the Day by Thomas Pynchon, Reef Traverse, one of the novel's characters, works on the construction of the Simplon Tunnel.

In the novel "The Couloir" by Richard Manichello, the Canton Valais is a major geographical setting for action and scenes. Especially, the Val de Bagnes. Brig and the Simplon Pass & Tunnel play an important role in the main plot, moving characters in and out of Western Swiss locations or over the Pennine Alps for various intrigues and subplots involving action that traverses Swiss and Italian story settings.

== Notes ==
Records
Preceded by Gotthard Rail Tunnel	Longest tunnel 1906–1982	Succeeded by Daishimizu Tunnel
