= Iselle di Trasquera railway station =

Piedmontese train stop

Iselle di Trasquera
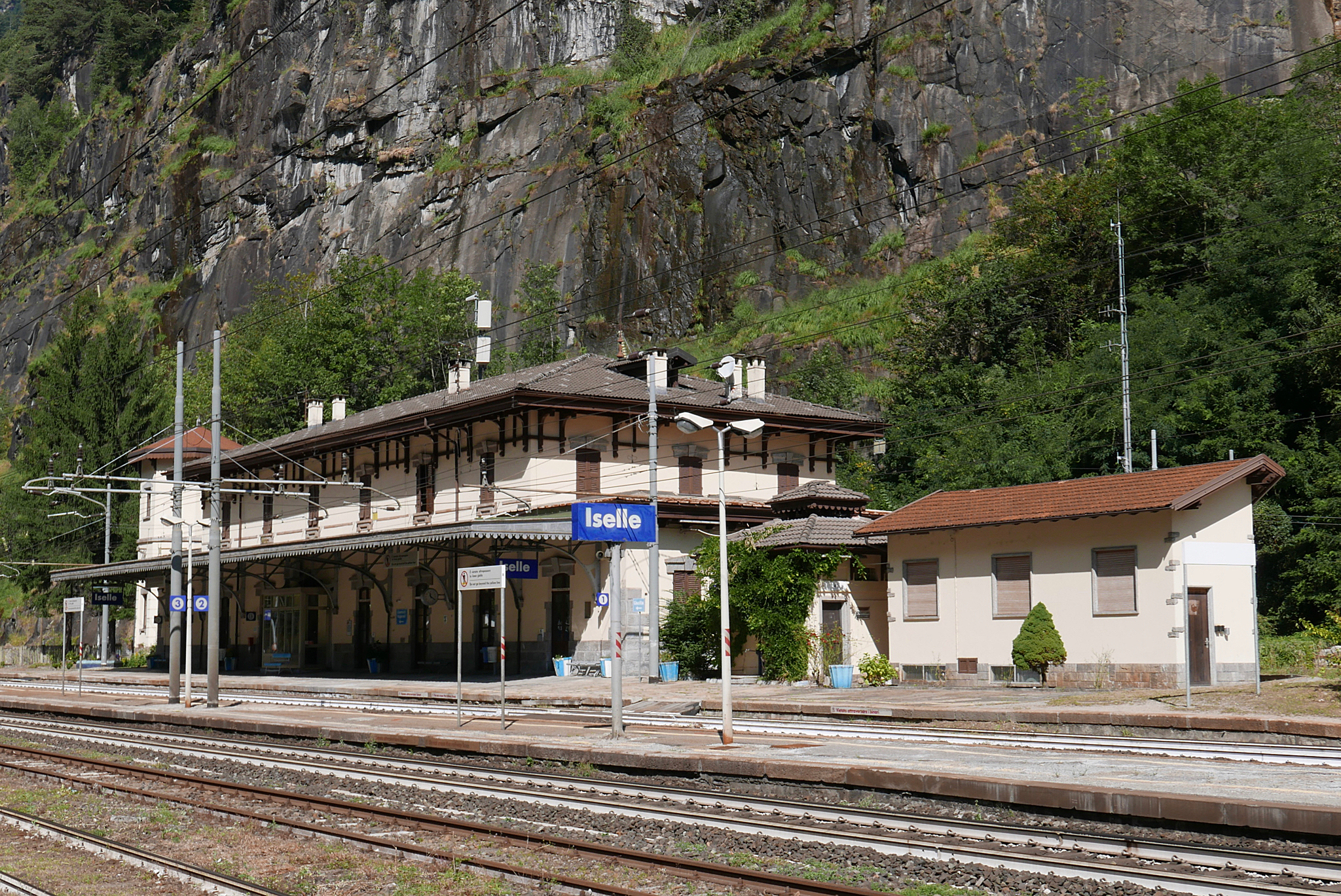
- The station platforms in 2016

General information
- Location: Trasquera; Italy
- Coordinates: 46°12′25″N 8°12′25″E
- Elevation: 629 m (2,064 ft)
- Owner: Rete Ferroviaria Italiana
- Line: Simplon line
- Distance: 18.8 km (11.7 mi) from Domodossola
- Platforms: 2
- Train operators: BLS AG
- Connections: Local buses

Construction
- Accessible: No

Other information
- Station code: 8501952 (IS)

History
- Opened: 14 June 1906

Services
Preceding station	BLS	Following station
Brig towards Bern	RE1	Varzo towards Domodossola
Brig towards Visp	RE2	Domodossola One-way operation
Location
- Location within Piedmont Location within Northern Italy Location within Italy

Iselle di Trasquera railway station (Italian: Stazione di Iselle di Trasquera) serves the village of Iselle and municipality of Trasquera, in the region of Piedmont, northwestern Italy. Opened in 1906, the station is at the southern portal of the Simplon tunnel, on the Simplon line, between Brig, Switzerland and Domodossola, Italy. It is also the border station between Italy and Switzerland. All rail services to and from the station are operated by BLS AG, a Swiss company.

== Location ==
The station is situated at Via Stazione, immediately to the south of the southern portal of the Simplon Tunnel, which passes underneath the border between Switzerland and Italy.

The village of Iselle, which gave its name to the station, is about 1 km (0.62 mi) upstream on the river Diveria, towards the Simplon Pass.

== History ==
The station was opened on 1 June 1906, upon the inauguration of the Brig–Domodossola railway, including the Simplon tunnel.

A monument in memory of the deceased workers of the Simplon Tunnel was erected on 29 May 1905.

Until 1929, the station was the point where locomotives were exchanged at the head of trains, because the Brig–Iselle section was operated by electric traction while trains on the Iselle–Domodossola section were powered by steam locomotives.

== Services ==
The following services stop at Iselle di Trasquera:

- RegioExpress: service every two hours between Bern and Domodossola, increasing to hourly during rush-hour.
- Seasonal car shuttle train to Brig.

== Gallery ==
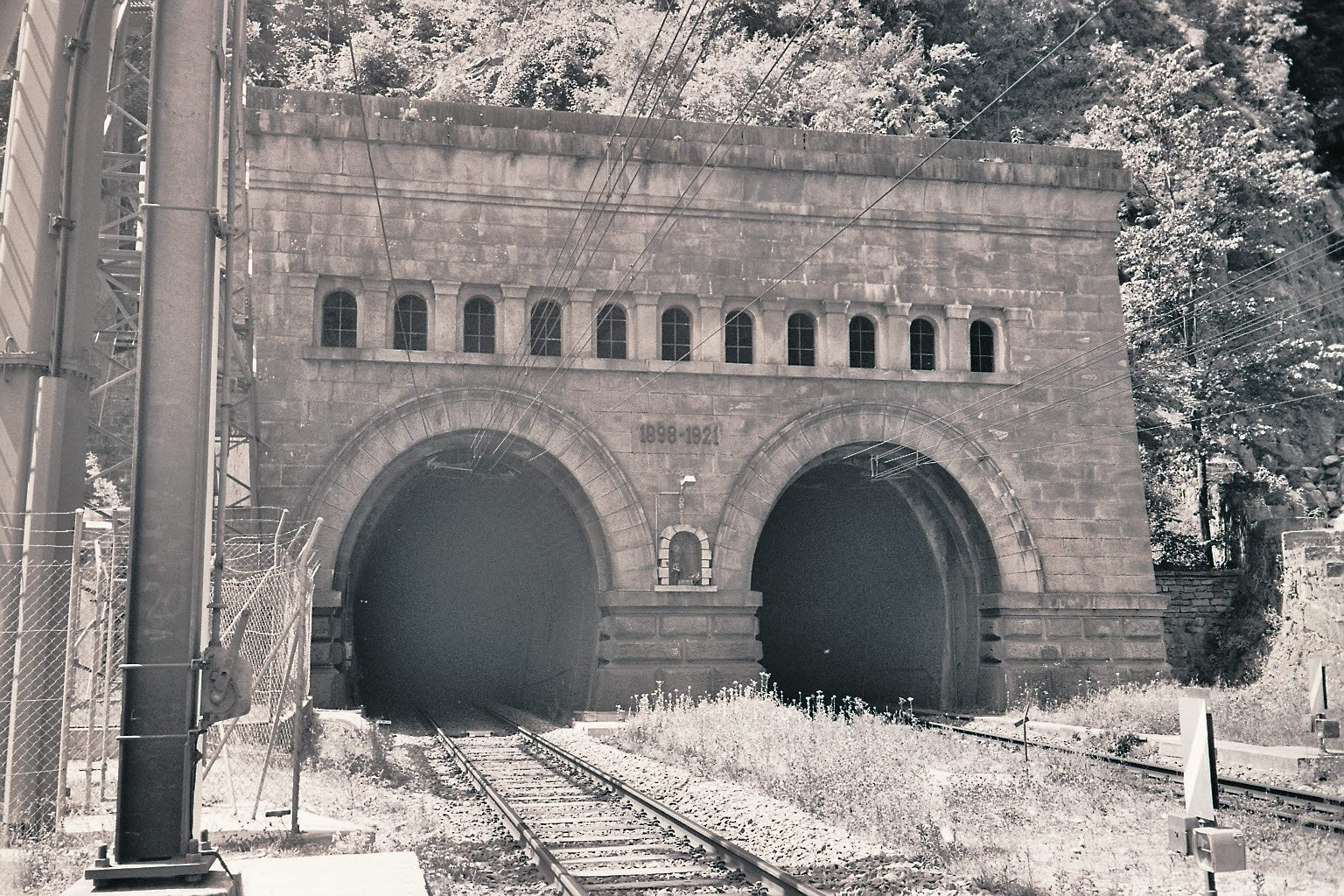
Southern portal of the Simplon Tunnel

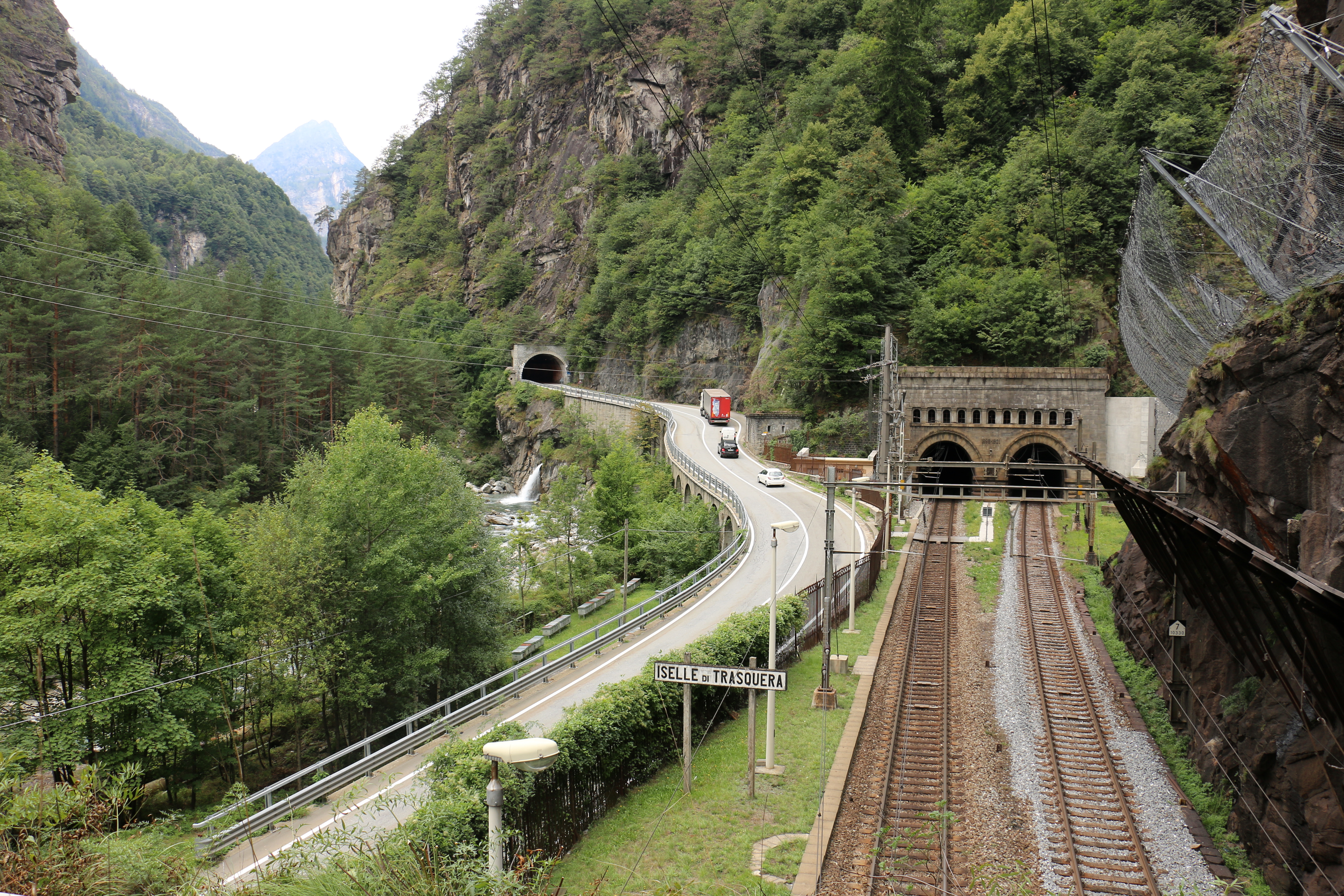
South portal at Iselle di Trasquera railway station. The picture was taken through a loophole of an old Italian World War II bunker. The bunkers weapons were directed to the tunnels south portal.

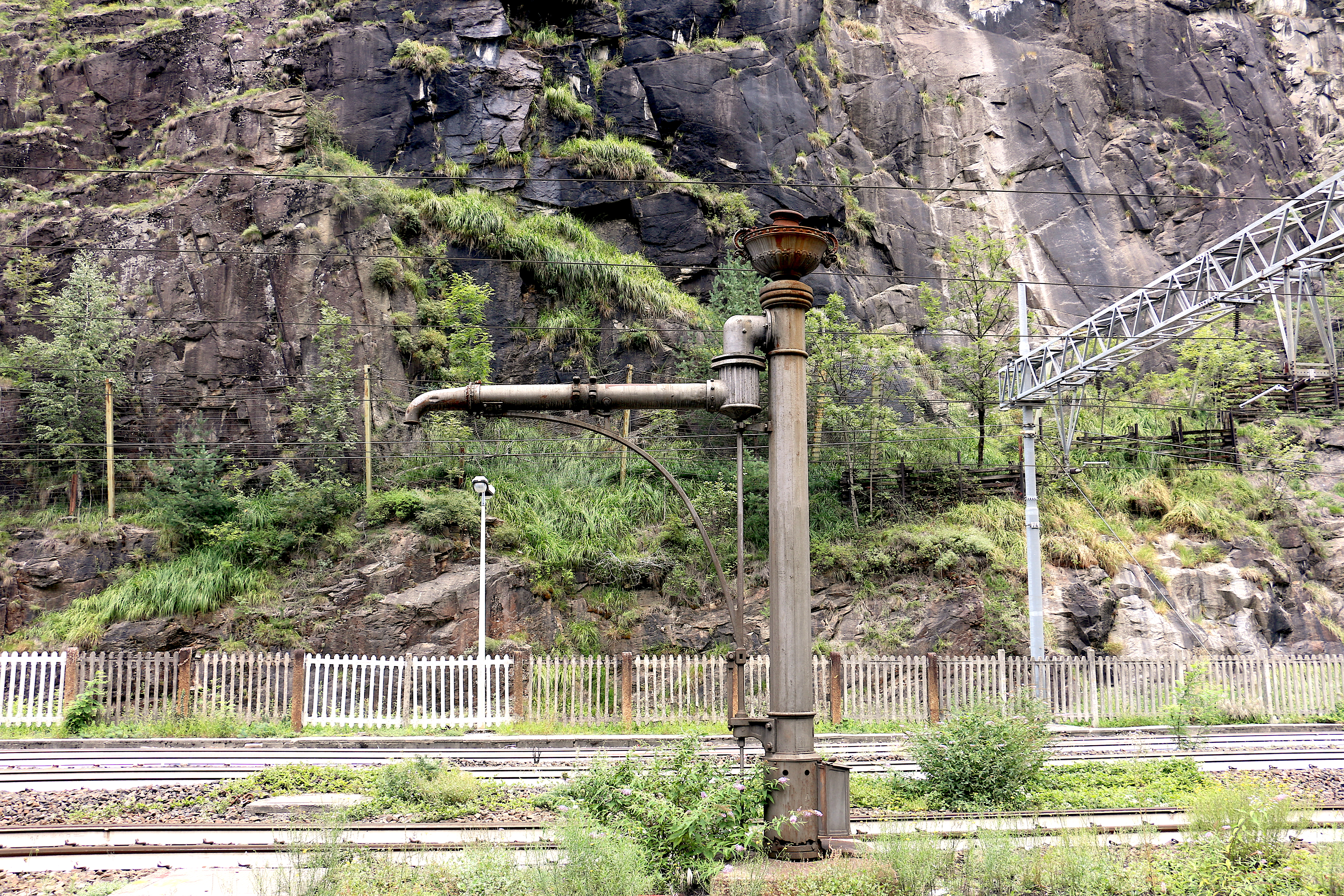
The Watercrane used to refill the steam locomotives till 1929 is still (2017) present.

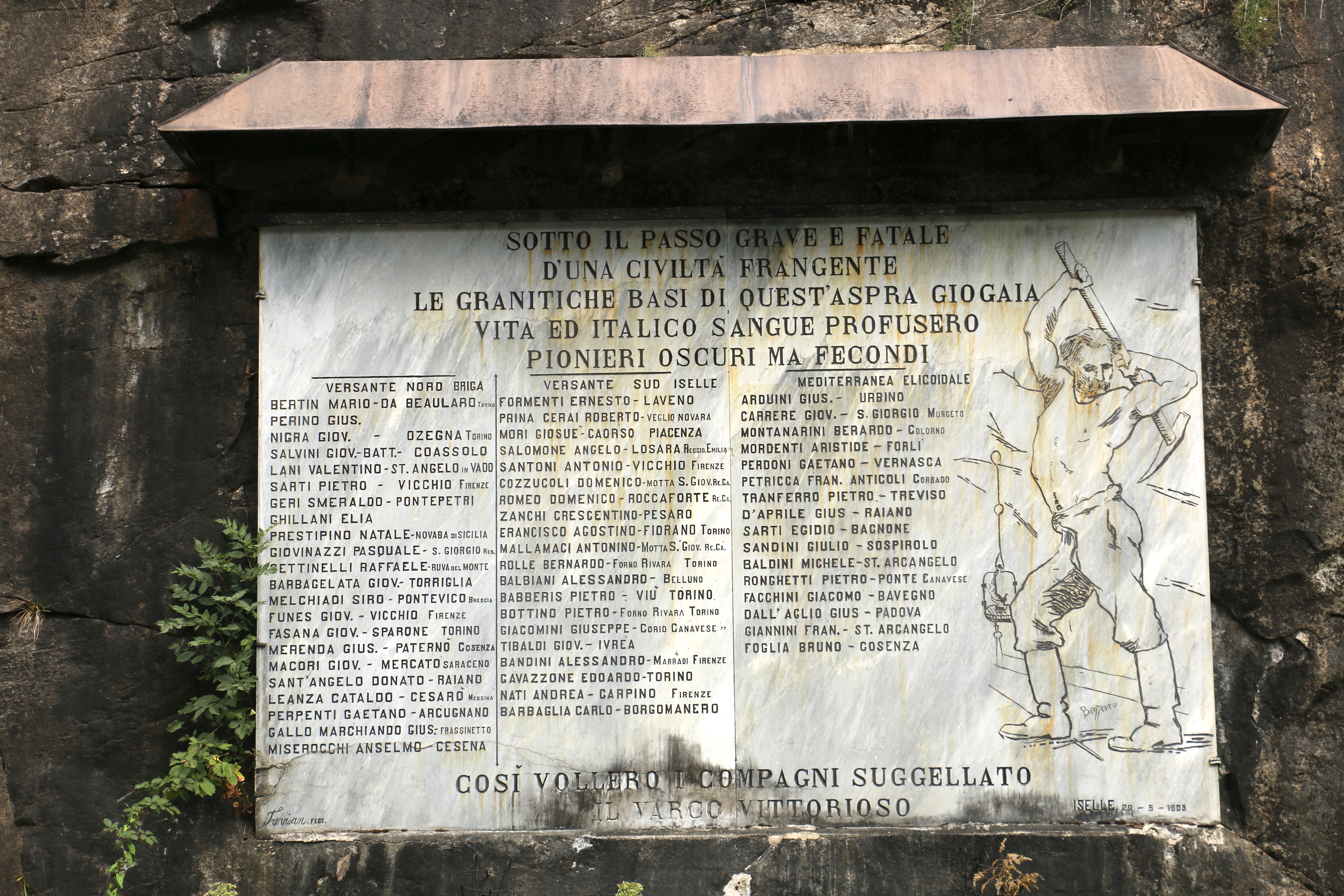
Monument in memory of the deceased workers of the Simplon Tunnel

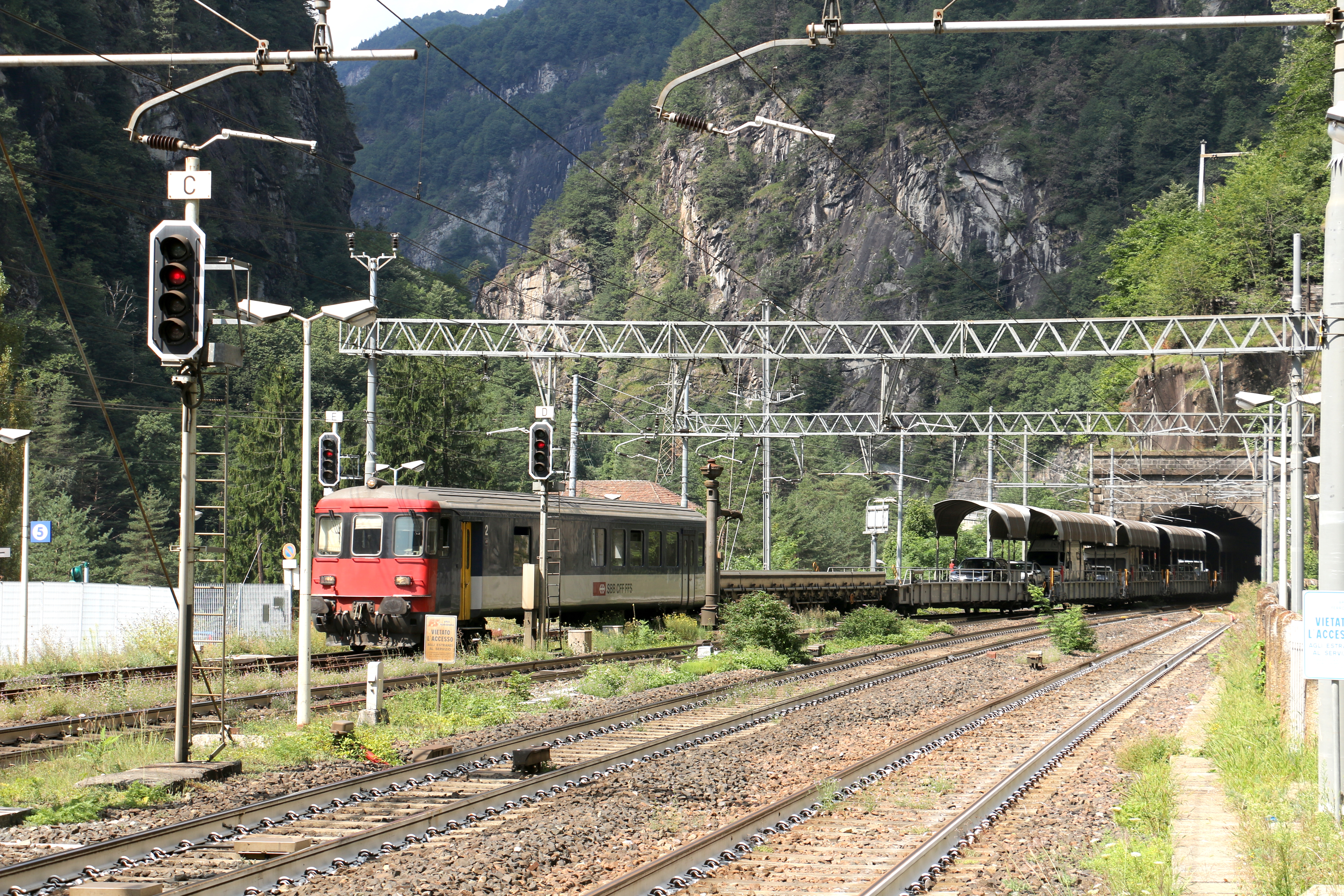
A car transport train arriving from Brig to Iselle di Trasquera

== See also ==
- History of rail transport in Italy
- Rail transport in Italy
- Railway stations in Italy
