= Varzo =

Varzo Varsc
- Comune
- Comune di Varzo
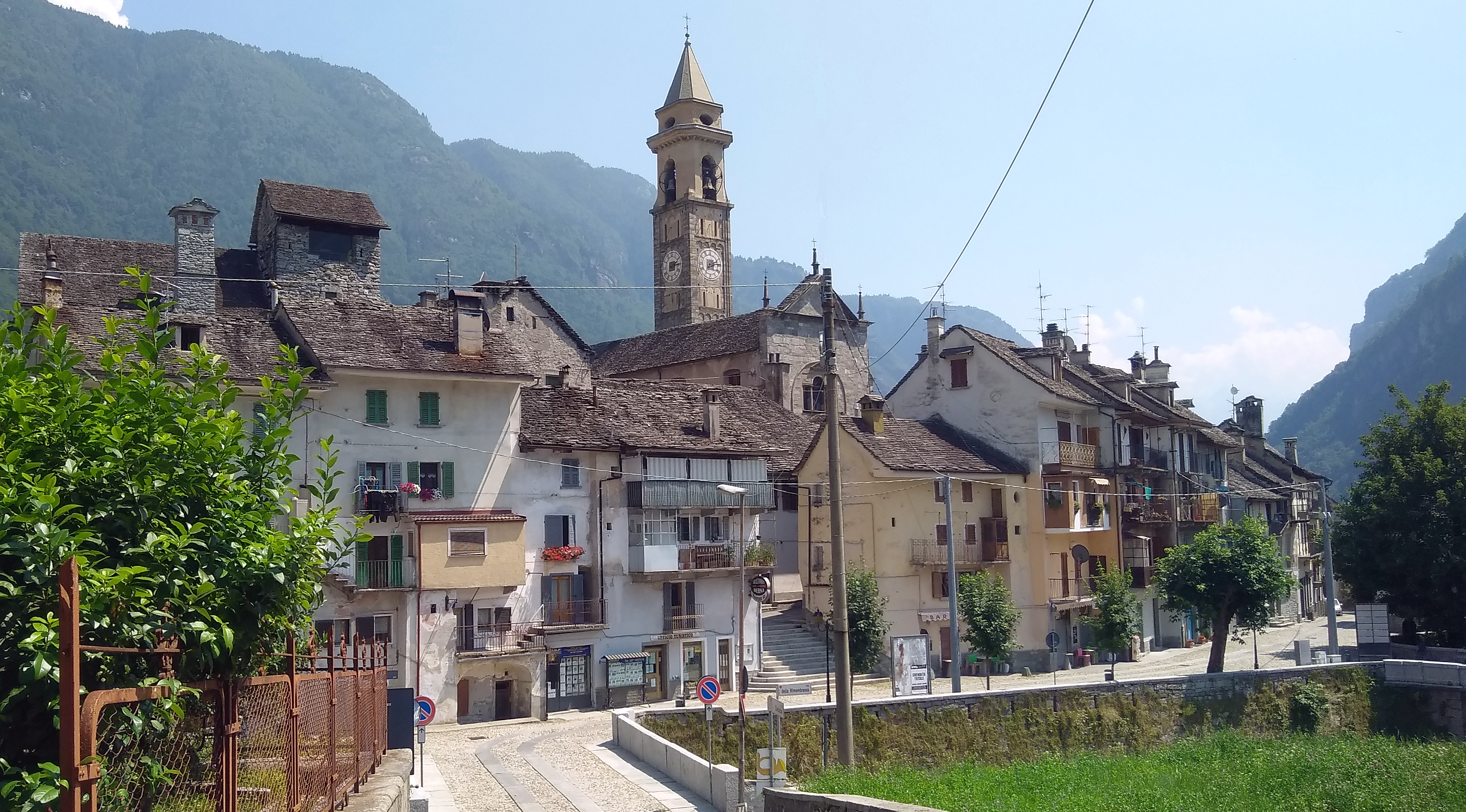
- Municipality centre

- Location within Italy Location within Piedmont
- Coordinates: 46°12′N 8°15′E
- Country: Italy
- Region: Piedmont
- Province: Province of Verbano-Cusio-Ossola (VB)

Area
  - Total: 94.4 km^{2} (36.4 sq mi)
- Elevation: 568 m (1,864 ft)

Population (Dec. 2004)
  - Total: 2,209
  - Density: 23.4/km^{2} (60.6/sq mi)
- Demonym: Varzesi
- Time zone: UTC+1 (CET)
  - Summer (DST): UTC+2 (CEST)
- Postal code: 28868
- Dialing code: 0324
- Website: Official website

Varzo (Lombard: Varsc) is a comune (municipality) in the Province of Verbano-Cusio-Ossola in the Italian region Piedmont, located about 130 kilometres (81 mi) northeast of Turin and about 35 kilometres (22 mi) northwest of Verbania, on the border with Switzerland. As of 31 December 2004, it had a population of 2,209 and an area of 94.4 square kilometres (36.4 mi^{2}).

The Varzo railway station has connections to Bern and Domodossola.

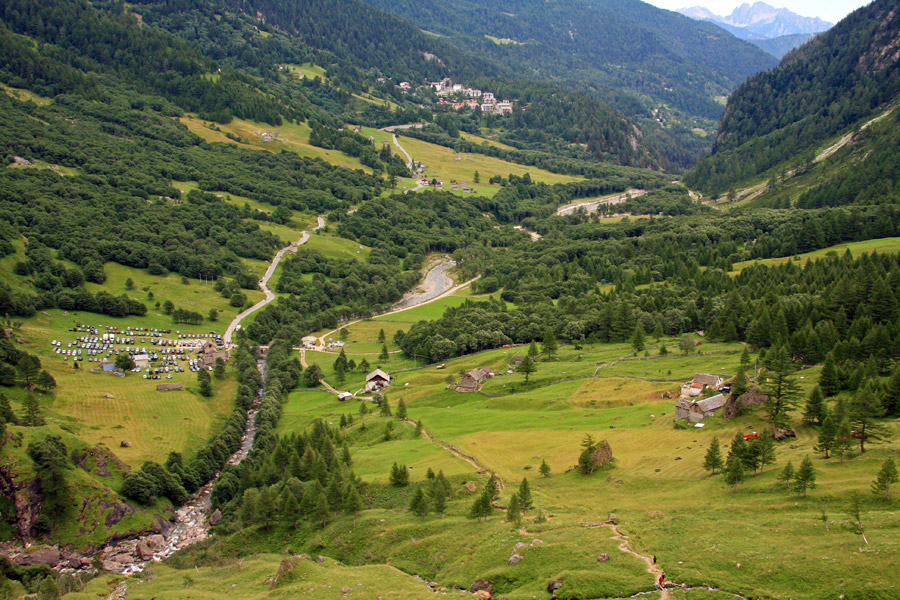
Alpine scenery in Varzo

Varzo borders the following municipalities: Baceno, Bognanco, Crevoladossola, Crodo, Grengiols (Switzerland), Ried-Brig (Switzerland), Trasquera, Zwischbergen (Switzerland).

Varzo is also known because of the Alpe Veglia Natural Park.
