= History of rail transport in Switzerland =

The construction and operation of Swiss railways during the 19th century was carried out by private railways. The first internal line was a 16 km line opened from Zürich to Baden in 1847. By 1860 railways connected western and northeastern Switzerland. The first Alpine railway to be opened was under the Gotthard Pass in 1882. A second alpine line was opened under the Simplon Pass in 1906.

In 1901, the major railways were nationalised to form Swiss Federal Railways. During the first half of the twentieth century they were electrified and slowly upgraded. After the Second World War, rail rapidly lost its share of the rail market to road transport as car ownership rose and more roads were built. From 1970, the Federal Government has become more involved in upgrading the railways, especially in urban areas and on trunk routes under the Rail 2000 project. In addition, two major trans-alpine routes—the Gotthard Railway and the Lötschberg approach to the Simplon Tunnel—were rebuilt under the NRLA project.

== Origins ==
In 1833 the Grand Duchy of Baden developed plans for a railway connecting the cities Mainz and Frankfurt with Basel and onwards to Chur and Northern Italy. The first line in Switzerland, the extension of the French Strasbourg–Basel Railway (French: Chemin de fer de Strasbourg à Bâle) from Mulhouse to Basel, reached a temporary station outside Basel's walls on 15 June 1844 and the permanent station on 11 December 1845. (The Chemins de fer de l'Est took over the company in 1854.) Addressing Swiss worries over French influence due to a locomotives name Napoleon, the Alsacians purchased a separate locomotive called City of Basel (French: Ville de Bâle) for their access to Basel. The Grand Duchy of Baden State Railway's Rhine Valley Line reached the original Basel Baden railway station in 1855. Despite constant discussion, it took some time before these lines were extended into Switzerland.

== Early railways ==
The first internal Swiss line, the 16 km long Swiss Northern Railway (German: Schweizerische Nordbahn, SNB) opened from Zürich to Baden in 1847. Private companies—led by Swiss entrepreneurs, industrialists and bankers—built the next wave of railways. In 1850 the Swiss Federal Council invited two British engineers, Robert Stephenson and Henry Swinburne, to draw up plans for a railway network for the Swiss Confederation. They proposed a 645 km network along the valleys, avoiding any Alpine crossings, all of which was eventually built.

Although the Constitution of 1848 gave the federal government powers in relation to railways, it initially decided to decentralise rail policy. The first Railway Act of 1852 gave responsibility for administering policy in relation to the construction and operation of railways to the cantons, including licensing of companies, coordination of lines, technical specifications and pricing policy. Railways were to be built by private limited-liability companies, with contributions to be provided by the municipalities and cantons that stood to benefit from projects. Despite the lack of overall planning and the rivalry among the companies, a rail network similar to that proposed by Stephenson and Swinburne soon formed in northern and western Switzerland, with the completion of a link from the French border in the far west near Geneva to the Austrian border in the far northeast at St. Margrethen on 10 December 1860.

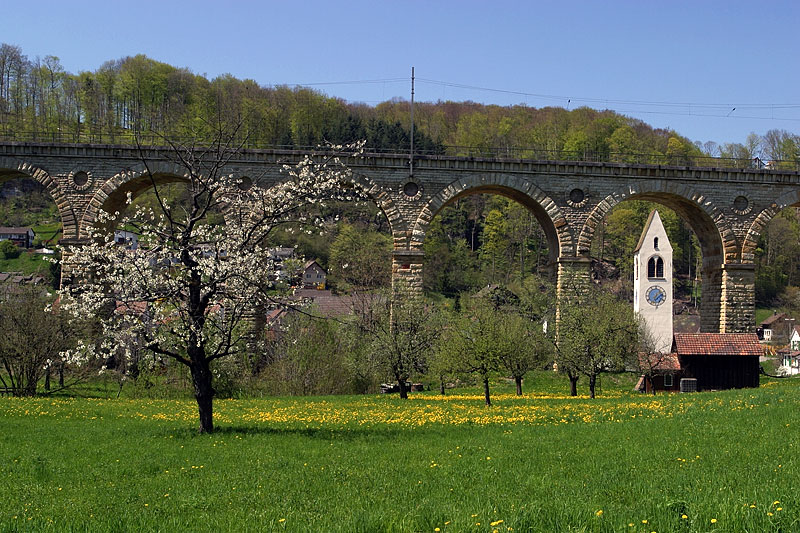
Ruemlingen Viaduct on the original Basel-Olten line opened in 1858

In 1853 the Swiss Central Railway (German: Schweizerische Centralbahn, SCB) began to build the Basel-Olten line through the Hauenstein pass, with branches from Olten to Aarau, Lucerne, Bern and Thun and from Herzogenbuchsee to Solothurn and Biel. At the same time the Swiss Northeastern Railway (German: Schweizerische Nordostbahn, NOB) concentrated on eastern Switzerland in the cantons of Zürich and Thurgau; its network covered the lines from Zürich to Lake Constance and to Schaffhausen and later to Lucerne. The United Swiss Railways (VSB) built lines from Winterthur to Rorschach and from Wallisellen to Rapperswil, Sargans and Chur. There were contracts for sharing the interlinked VSB line between Weesen and Glarus and the NOB line between Ziegelbrücke, Näfels, Glarus and Linthal.

During the same period, railways were built in western Switzerland along Lake Geneva from Geneva to Lausanne and Bex and from Morges to Yverdon. A steamship connected Geneva with the line from Le Bouveret to Martigny. The main developer in the inner part of Vaud was the West Switzerland Company (French: Compagnie de l'Ouest-Suisse, OS) and in the Valais the Company of the Line of Italy (French: Compagnie de la Ligne d'Italie, absorbed by the Simplon Company (French: Compagnie du Simplon) in 1874). The Jura–Neuchâtel Railway emerged from lines from Le Locle and Les Verrières along Lake Neuchâtel to La Neuveville.

The Canton of Fribourg delayed the construction of the line from Bern to Lausanne in a bid to have it run through the city of Fribourg rather than on flatter land further west; in 1857, the Swiss government, the canton of Vaud and the West Switzerland Company gave in, allowing construction to commence on the line, which opened in 1862. The Canton of Bern attempted to make its own policy in relation to its railways. At the initiative of its Federal politician Jakob Stämpfli the Swiss East–West Railway ( German: Schweizerische Ostwestbahn, OWB) started building a line in 1857—to compete with the Swiss Central Railway—between La Neuveville (on Lake Biel) and Zürich via Bern, Langnau im Emmental, Luzern and Zug, but without raising sufficient finance to guarantee its completion. In June 1861 it went bankrupt; the Canton of Bern took over the completed section from La Neuveville and Langnau and incorporated it as the Bern State Railway (German: Bernische Staatsbahn, BSB), which continued building the line to Lucerne. The missing section from Langnau to Entlebuch and Lucerne was not completed until 1875. The concession for the Zürich–Lucerne line via Affoltern am Albis was taken over by the Zürich–Zug–Lucerne Railway (German: Zürich–Zug–Luzern-Bahn, ZZL), a subsidiary of the NOB.

Financial difficulties led to a series of mergers and increased foreign investment in the rail companies. French investment in Switzerland was also stimulated by an interest in Alpine crossings. Many of the original companies merged with the Swiss Northeastern Railway (German: Schweizerische Nordostbahn) and with the United Swiss Railways (German: Vereinigte Schweizerbahnen, VSB) in the east and with the Jura–Simplon Railway (French: Compagnie du Jura–Simplon, JS) in the west. Despite the financial difficulties, by 1860 a continuous line extended from Geneva to Lake Constance, and by 1870 other main routes were completed. Steamers connected to the railways across several major lakes: Geneva, Neuchâtel, Thun, Lucerne, and Constance. Connections to the networks of neighboring countries occurred at Romanshorn (by train ferries to Lindau and Friedrichshafen), at Basel by rail to the Baden Mainline and to the French Chemins de fer de l'Est, at Schaffhausen to the Baden Mainline and at Les Verrières to the line to Pontarlier and Paris.

== 1870–1902 ==
The Franco-Prussian War (1870–71) showed up problems of the private railway to cope with the need to move troops quickly, leading to the second Railway Act of 1872. This transferred control of construction, operation, tariffs and accounting of the railways and the licensing of railway companies from the cantons to the federal government. The possibility of federal government nationalisation of the railways also became part of the political agenda.

Johann Jakob Sulzer (1806–1883), a Democratic Party politician from Winterthur, founded the Lake Constance–Lake Geneva Railway (German: Bodensee-Genfersee-Bahn), later renamed the Swiss National Railway (German: Schweizerische Nationalbahn, SNB) to overcome shortcomings of the existing railways in providing an adequate and co-ordinated network. It planned to build a line from Lake Constance and Singen to Lausanne via Winterthur, Aargau, Solothurn, Lyss, Murten and Payerne. Construction started in 1875 but it went bankrupt in 1878 and its assets were acquired by the NOB and SCB.

=== Alpine railways ===
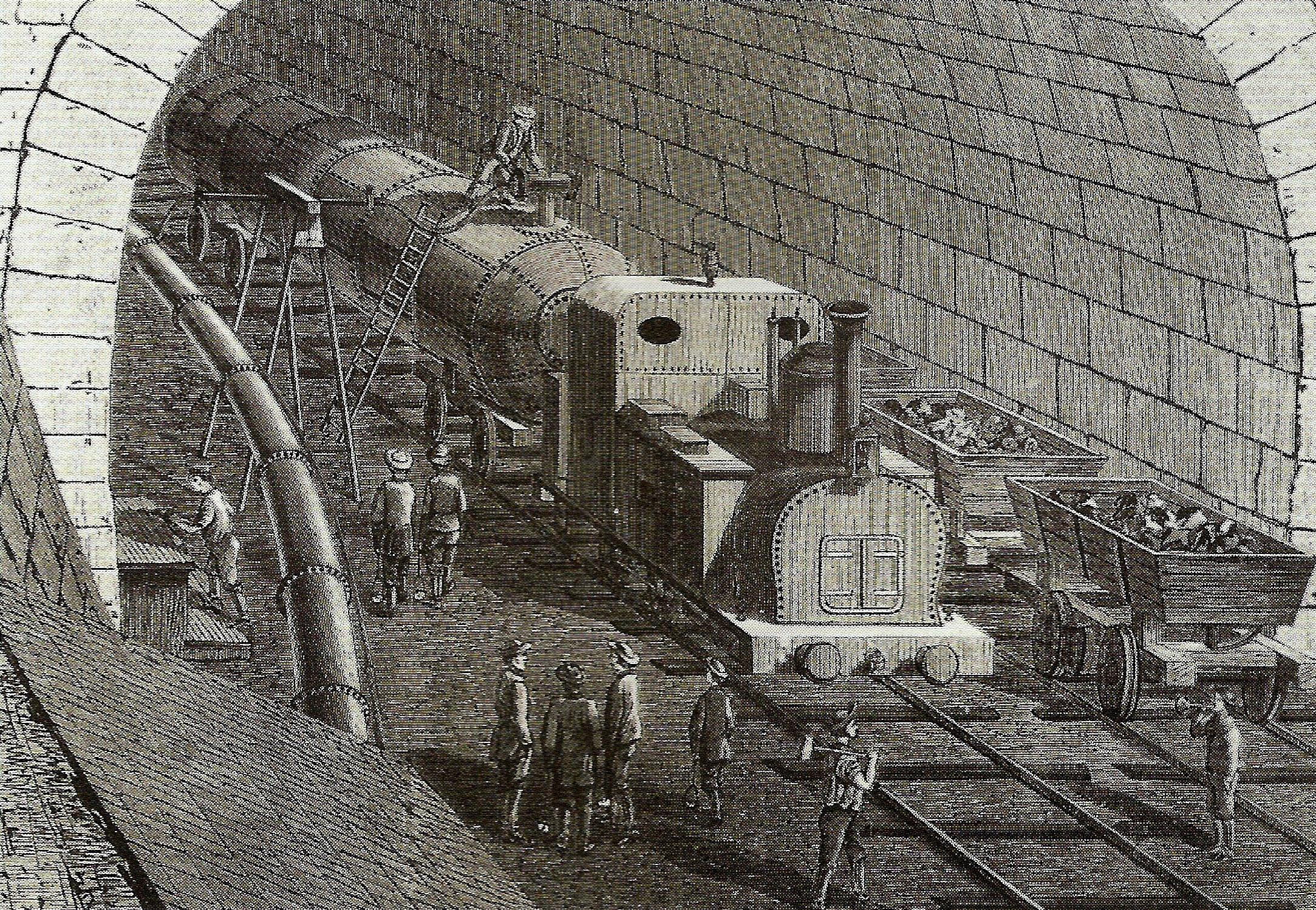
Contemporary drawing showing a construction locomotive on the Gotthard Railway

Before the construction of the Gotthard Railway there were no north-south rail connections to Italy. The railroad lines ended at the foot of the Alps—the VSB reached Chur in 1858, the SCB reached Lucerne and Thun in 1859, and in 1878 the Simplon Railway (part of the Western Switzerland–Simplon Company from 1881) reached Brig. The Swiss railway companies and regions competed to build a railway though various Swiss Alpine passes: the Lukmanier, the Splügen, the Gotthard and the Simplon. In view of the completion of the Brenner Railway to the east in 1867 and the commencement of construction of the Fréjus railway line in 1857 (completed in 1871) in the west, it was decided to build the Gotthard railway and contracts were signed with Swiss, German and Italian contractors in 1869. Despite financial difficulties the line was opened in 1882.

In 1878, the Swiss approved in a referendum federal subsidies for an eastern and a western Alpine rail crossing. In 1913 a western Alps was completed, the Lötschberg railway line, but it was not a federal project, but instead it was an initiative of the canton of Bern. No eastern rail crossing has ever been built. Instead the Rhaetian Railway (RhB) opened the Albula line in 1903 and the Bernina Railway completed the Bernina line in 1910, providing a link to Italy. These lines were initially built for tourists, but they were later also used for freight.

=== Branch lines ===
In the 1870s, branch lines began to be built. Two-thirds of them were built as narrow gauge lines to reduce costs. Fifty branch lines were built in the period from 1874 to 1877, including the Gäu Railway (German: Gäubahn) between Solothurn and Olten (completed in 1876) and the Broye valley lines near Freiburg (1877), both originally planned by the SNB. Also built during this period were the Emmental railway (German: Emmentalbahn) from Solothurn to Burgdorf and Langnau im Emmental (opened 1875-81) and the Wädenswil–Einsiedeln railway ("pilgrim railway", opened 1877). Also opened between 1874 and 1881 was the Aargau Southern Railway, from Rupperswil to Rotkreuz, which later became a freight feeder line to the Gotthard railway. The Lake Constance–Toggenburg Railway (from Romanshorn to Nesslau and Swiss Southeastern Railway (German: Schweizerische Südostbahn) connected the east-central to southern Switzerland.

The Railway Act of 1852 mandated 1,435 mm (4 ft 8 1/2 in) standard gauge. The reform of 1872 allowed local and mountain railways to be built with different gauges. The Swiss Company for Local Railways planned a narrow gauge network in the Alpine region, but only succeeded in building the Appenzeller Bahn (Appenzell Railway) because of financial problems. In the Jura region of the Canton of Bern, the Jura Bernois Railway (JB) constructed a railway with massive financial assistance from the Canton of Bern. Between 1873 and 1877, the Jura line with the main railway line between Delle and Basel and the lines from Biel to Sonceboz-Sombeval and Delémont and La Chaux-de-Fonds were built. In the 1880s, narrow gauge lines were built to isolated factories and villages in Vaud and the Jura region.

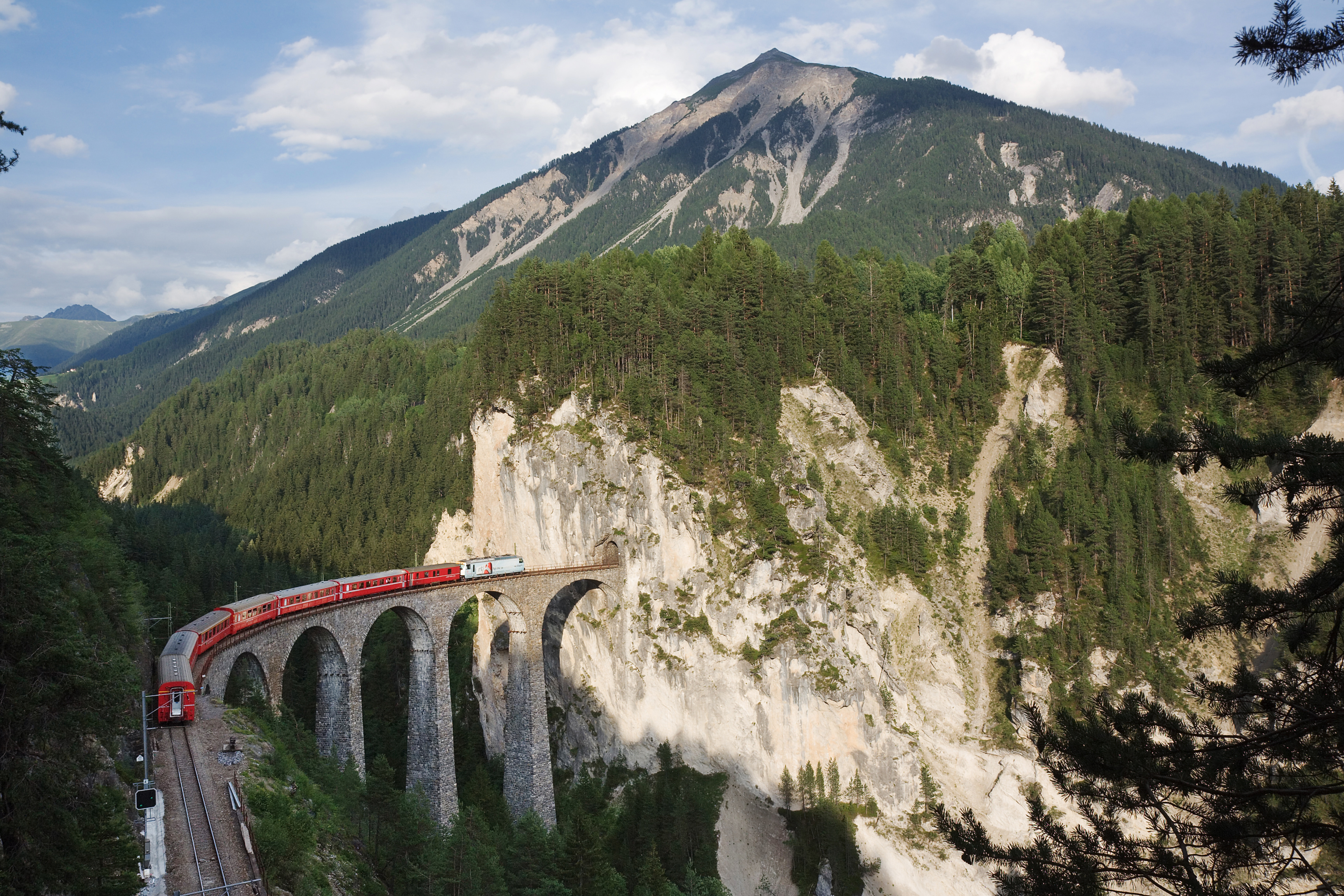
Landwasser Viaduct on the Rhaetian Railway

By 1880, railways had been built in the Alpine regions to a few valleys and tourist areas. In the Graubünden, the Rhaetian Railway (RhB), founded in 1889, had developed lines by the outbreak of World War I along the valleys of the Hinterrhein, Vorderrhein, the Albula, the Engadine and the Poschiavo. In the Bernese Oberland, railways were built to connect to the tourist region around Lake Thun. Narrow gauge lines were built in the western Alps, such as the Montreux–Lenk im Simmental line, the Furka Oberalp Bahn (FO) and the Gruyère-Fribourg-Morat Railway (GFM). The tourist-oriented Domodossola–Locarno line—also called the Centovalli (Italian for "100 valleys") railway—was completed in 1923, connecting Ticino and the Valais via Italy.

== Early twentieth century ==
=== Nationalisation ===
The 1872 Railway Act gave the federal government broad powers in the railway sector. In 1879 the federal government established a new Department of Post and Railways with powers over railways and the postal sector. The bankruptcy of several railway companies during the 1870s, rail strikes and opposition to foreign ownership of the railways led to support for the nationalisation of the railways. In 1891, the nationalisation of the SCB was rejected in a referendum, but it was approved by the Federal Council in 1897. A referendum in 1898 was strongly contested, obtaining the highest level of voting participation to that date and won a two-thirds majority. Between 1900 and 1909, the Swiss Confederation acquired the five big railway companies, Jura–Simplon Railway (JS, 937 km), Swiss Northeastern Railway (NOB, 771 km), Swiss Central Railway (SCB, 398 km), United Swiss Railways (VSB, 269 km) and the Gotthard Railway (273 km), forming the Swiss Federal Railways (SFR). In 1903 the SBB network took over the metre gauge Brünig Railway (German: Brünigbahn) opened in 1888 and the Swiss shipping line on Lake Constance. It acquired another four small private railways between 1913 and 1948.

The negotiated purchase price of more than Swiss Francs 1 billion was criticised, especially as the owners had stopped investing when the debate over nationalisation started. The cost of the nationalisation was not charged directly to the federal budget, but was instead a debt of the SFR. As a result of the high debt burden, the SBB was significantly impeded in its development of the railways until 1944 when it was relieved of the debt resulting from its nationalisation.

=== Modernisation ===
The majority of the railway network was single track and its equipment and rolling stock was mostly in poor condition and unable to cope with increasing traffic. The difficult financial situation during the first half of the 20th century limited the modernisation of the Swiss rail network. The main works carried out were electrification, duplication and safety improvements. Electrification started on an experimental basis in 1888 and was completed in 1960. It was accelerated as a result of coal shortages during the two world wars. Of particular note was the early electrification of the Bern-Lötschberg-Simplon line, which was opened in 1913 with single-phase operation. At the beginning of World War II, 77% of the Swiss rail network had been electrified, while other European railways had a level of electrification of 5%.

The construction of tunnels shortened distances and improved gradients, allowing the improved handling of traffic growth. The Simplon tunnel between Brig and Iselle, Italy, was opened in 1906. The Mont-d'Or tunnel was opened between Vallorbe and Frasne, France, in 1915 and formed part of the route of the Orient Express between Paris and Istanbul from 1919 to 1962. The Hauenstein base tunnel was opened between Olten and Basel in 1916.

=== Private railways ===
Private railways were built to connect cities with suburbs, beginning with the metre gauge Bern-Muri-Worb Railway opened in 1898, now part of Bern-Solothurn Regional Transport. Additional standard gauge suburban lines were built to connect Bern with Thun via the Gürbe Valley (the Gürbe Valley Railway) and with Schwarzenburg and the metre gauge lines were extended to Zollikofen and Solothurn. The Great Depression of the 1930s hit the private railways hard, leading to operating deficits which prevented the renewal of equipment and rolling stock. Under the 1939 Private Assistance Act, the federal government provided financial support to the private railways in return for technical renewal and electrification and the reorganization of the private railways into regional networks.

== Post World War II ==
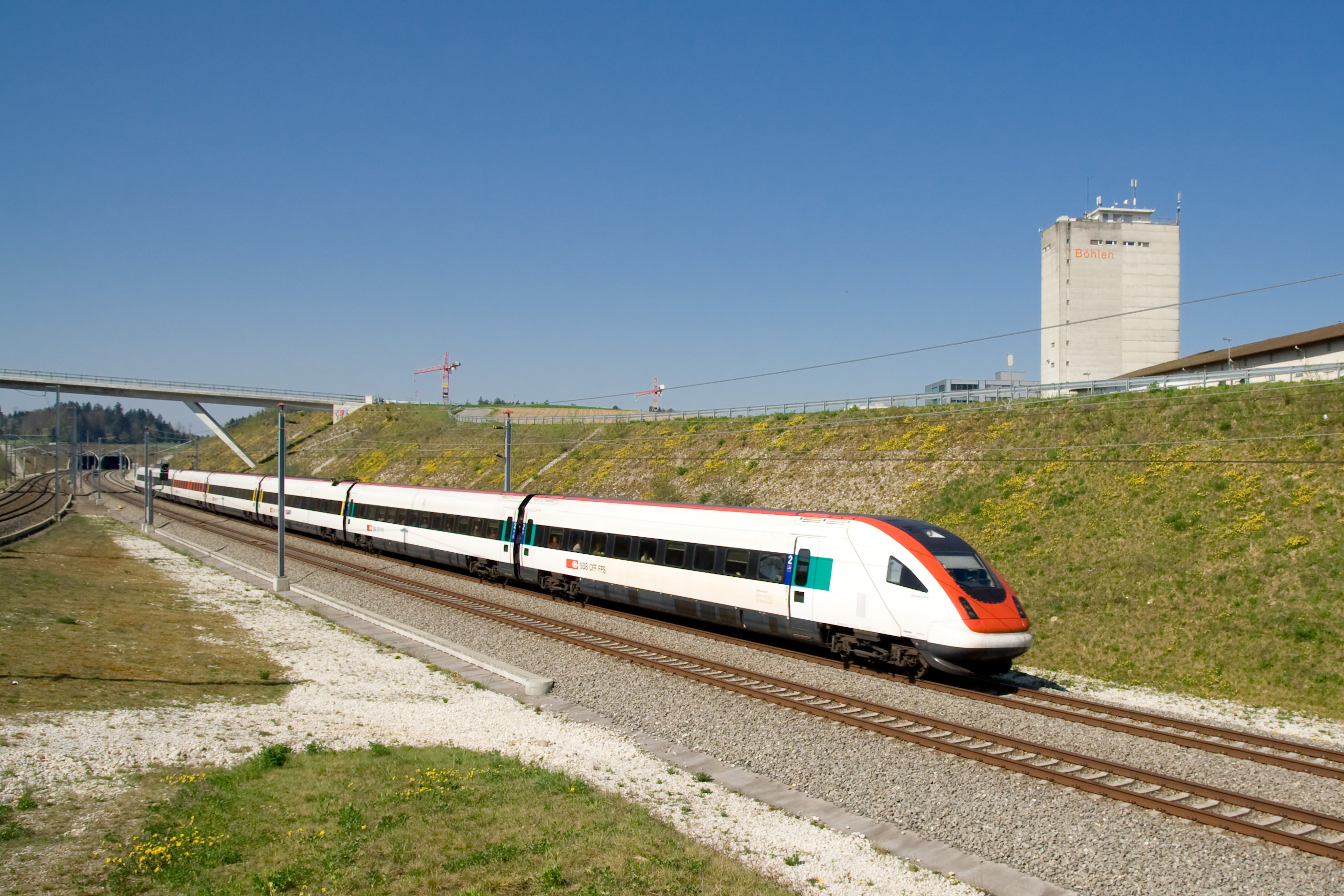
Intercity train on the Mattstetten–Rothrist new line

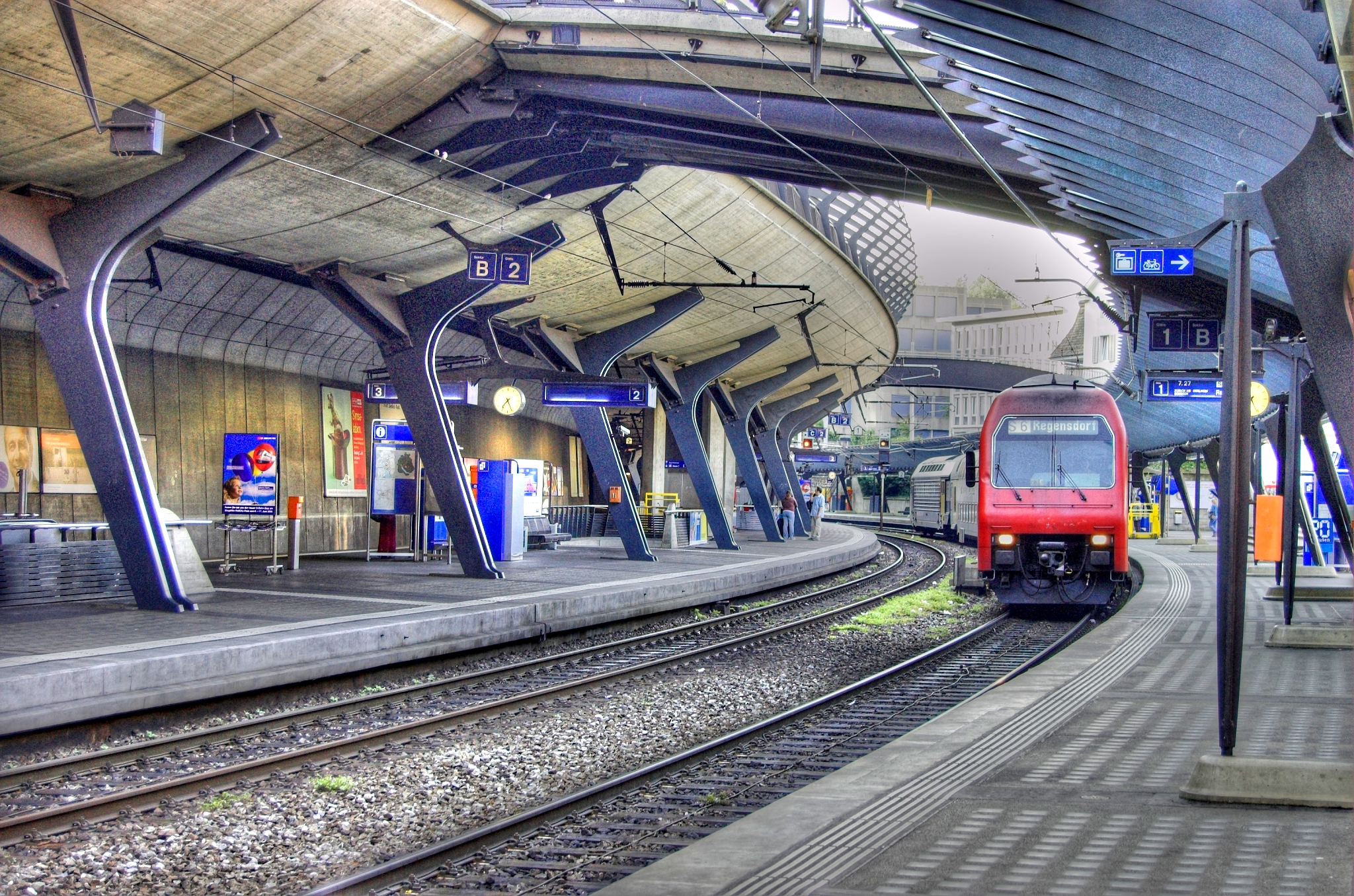
Zürich Stadelhofen station on the Zürich S-Bahn

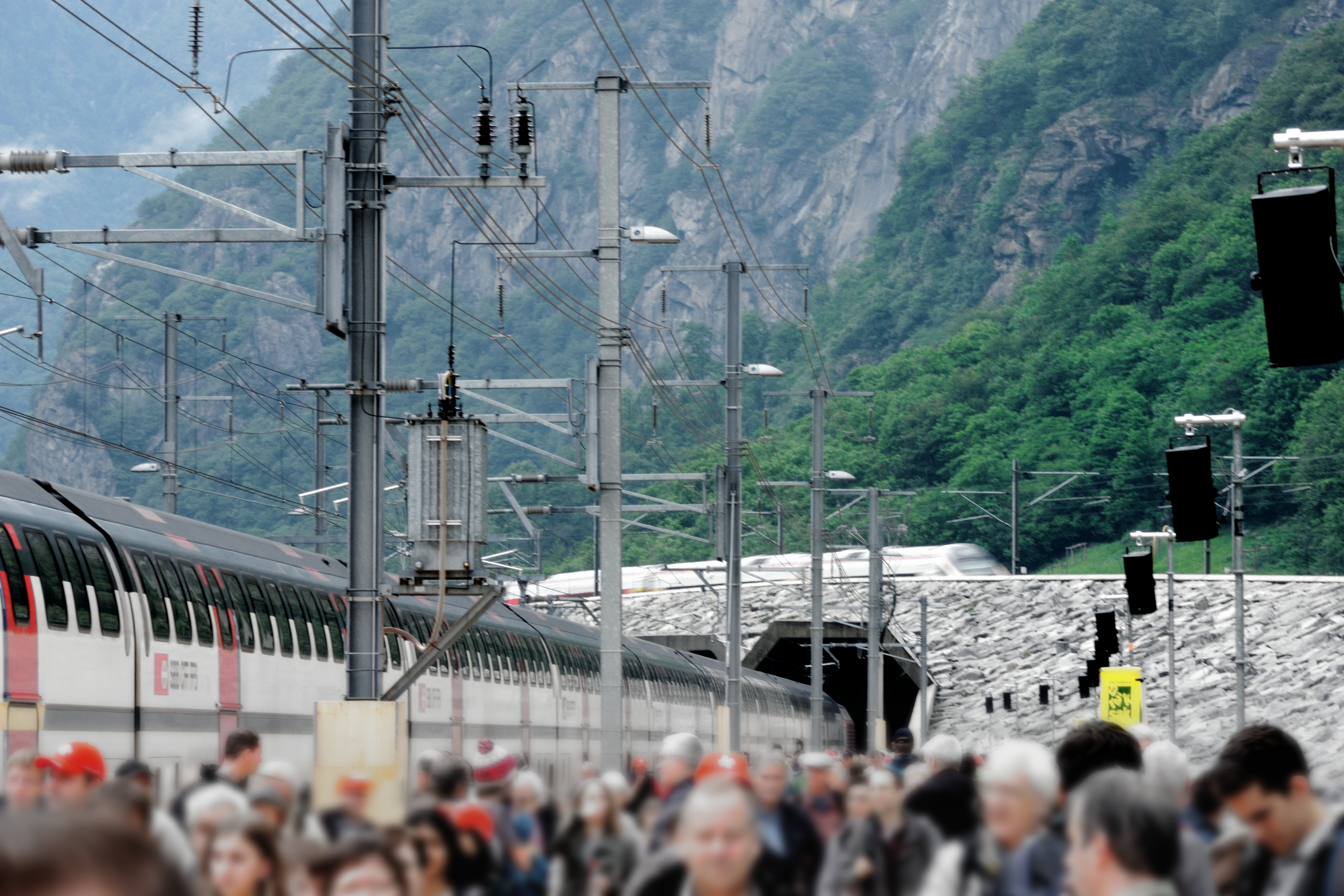
2016: Inauguration of the Gotthard Base Tunnel, the first flat route through the Alps

After years of heavy investment in roads in the postwar years, the share of rail in the total passenger market in Switzerland had been significantly reduced by the end of the 1960s. At this time, Swiss Federal Railways decided that changes were necessary to increase rail patronage. More trains were operated in order to increase frequencies; this led to a 75% increase in passengers between 1971 and 1983 on the Bern–Zürich route. In the 1970s, the Swiss government and SFR decided to make further improvements in rail services. In 1972, the SFR introduce a regular interval timetable (German: Taktfahrplan). Under this timetable, trains arrive and leave each station at the same minute past every hour. Services at Zurich station were reorganised so that trains arrived on each line before the hour or half-hour and left after the hour or half-hour, making it easier to change to trains on other lines.

=== Rail 2000 ===
In the late 1960s, the SFR developed a proposal for a new east-west trunkline (German: Haupttransversale, NHT). This was considered by the Swiss Transport Commission (German: Schweizerische Gesamtverkehrskommission, GVK). In 1977, after almost six years work, the GVK submitted a 400-page report, which recommended the construction of a new railway between Geneva and Lake Constance and between Basel and Olten. On these routes, a total of 120 kilometres of new line would allow operation of trains at up to 200 kilometres per hour, similar to the French TGVs. A Federal Government committee supported SFR's proposal but considered that investment should be initially concentrated on the sections of route between Basel, Olten and Bern. This proposal was widely seen as too narrow in its benefits and in mid 1984 the SFR established an expert group under the name Rail 2000 to develop a broader approach. This group developed a plan to improve rail transport throughout Switzerland based on the approach of co-ordinated regular interval trains. The federal parliament voted to approve Rail 2000 in May 1986. In particular, it granted CHF 5.4 billion for the Mattstetten–Rothrist new line between Olten and Bern and for a connection from near Herzogenbuchsee to Solothurn. This was endorsed by a referendum in 1987 with a majority of 57.0%.

=== Zürich S-Bahn ===
After years of debate, a referendum of Zürich Canton agreed, on 29 November 1981, to the borrowing of CHF 520 million for the construction of the main lines for the Zürich S-Bahn, based around a tunnel from the Zürich main station (connecting to the west, south and north) to Zürich Stadelhofen station (connecting to the southeast) and Dietlikon (connecting to the northeast) and Dübendorf (connecting to the east). On 27 May 1990, the S-Bahn was put into operation and then expanded in several phases into the current 380 kilometre long network.

=== Alpine crossings ===
In 1996, funding was approved for the upgrading of the two major alpine rail crossings, the Gotthard Railway, including the 57 km long Gotthard Base Tunnel and the Lötschberg Base Tunnel on the approach to the Simplon Tunnel. The Lötschberg Base Tunnel was opened in 2007, but most of its second line has been indefinitely deferred. The Gotthard Base Tunnel was finally opened in 2016, after nearly two decades of work, making high-speed travel below the Alps a reality. Further south, on the Gotthard axis, the Ceneri Base Tunnel opened in 2020.

== See also ==
- List of railway companies in Switzerland
- List of heritage railways and funiculars in Switzerland
- Rail transport in Switzerland
