= Solothurn–Wanzwil railway =

Swiss higher-speed railway line

Overview
- Locale: Bern, Solothurn, Switzerland

Technical
- Number of tracks: 1
- Track gauge: 1,435 mm (4 ft 8 1/2 in) standard gauge
- Electrification: 15 kV/16.7 Hz AC overhead catenary

The Solothurn–Wanzwil railway was opened on 12 December 2004 to connect with the Mattstetten–Rothrist new line (high-speed line) as part of a package of railways forming Rail 2000.

The built route mostly uses the route of the Solothurn–Herzogenbuchsee railway, which was closed in 1992.

The Solothurn–Wanzwil section is single-track and, together with the Mattstetten–Rothrist line, was the first line in Switzerland to use the European Train Control System in regular operation.

The maximum speed from Solothurn to Subingen is 140 km/h and from there it is 200 km/h. The turnout at the transition to double-track can also be run at 200 km/h.

The line is mainly used by the ICN services on the St. Gallen–Lausanne/Geneva route, which pass through without stopping between Olten and Solothurn.

Additional colour light signalling was planned as a response to concerns that the ETCS system would not be ready for operation for the opening of the line (on 12 December 2004). Two conditions in the planning approval of the department of transport required that this fallback would be removed at the latest ten years after the start of operations. Additional work to optimise operations were planned as part of demolition work planned for late 2013 and early 2014, which were to cost CHF 7.4 million.
