= Rail 2000 =

Large-scale project of the Swiss Federal Railways

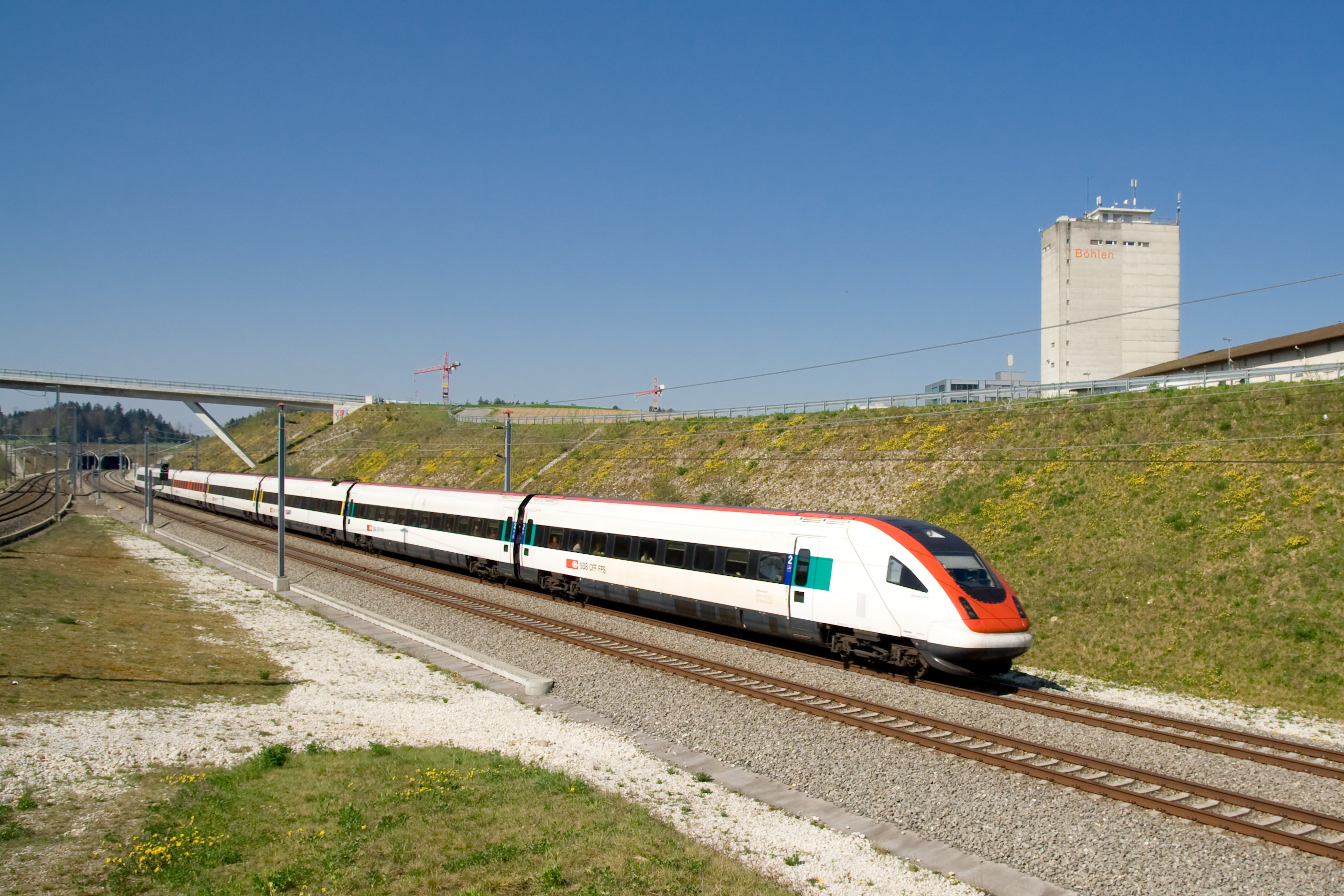
Intercity train on the Mattstetten–Rothrist line

Rail 2000 (German: Bahn 2000; French: Rail 2000, Italian: Ferrovia 2000) is a large-scale project of the Swiss Federal Railways (SBB CFF FFS) established in 1987 to improve the quality of the Swiss rail network for the New millennium. It includes measures to accelerate a number of existing connections and the modernisation of rolling stock. The federal government decision to support the project in 1986 was approved by a referendum in 1987. In 2004 the first phase was completed consisting of around 130 projects with a budget of around CHF 5.9 billion.

== History ==
=== Background ===
After years of heavy investment in roads in the postwar years, the share of rail in the total passenger market in Switzerland had been significantly reduced by the end of the 1960s. At this time SBB decided that changes were necessary to increase rail patronage. More trains were operated in order to increase frequencies; this led to a 75% increase in passengers between 1971 and 1983 on the Bern–Zürich route. In the 1970s the Swiss government and SBB decided to make further improvements in rail services. In 1972, the SBB introduced a regular interval timetable (German: Taktfahrplan). Under this timetable trains arrive and leave each station at the same minute past every hour. Services at Zürich HB were reorganised so that trains arrived on each line before the hour or half-hour and left after the hour or half-hour, making it easier to change to trains on other lines. This required the provision of additional platforms to allow every train to be in station simultaneously. The Rail 2000 project was intended to enhance the regular interval timetable.

=== New transverse trunkline ===
In the late 1960s the SBB developed a proposal for a new east-west trunkline (German: Haupttransversale, NHT). This was considered by the Swiss Transport Commission (German: Schweizerischen Gesamtverkehrskommission, GVK). In 1977 after almost six years work, the GVK submitted a 400-page report, which recommended the construction of a new railway between Geneva and Lake Constance and between Basel and Olten. On these routes, a total of 120 kilometres of new line would allow operation of trains at up to 200 kilometres per hour.

A Federal Government committee supported SBB's proposal but considered that investment should be initially concentrated on the sections of route between Basel, Olten and Bern. To the contrary, the canton of Solothurn complained that the new line would benefit only the large centres and that rural areas would be disadvantaged. An action committee was established to oppose it at a referendum. This proved unnecessary, however, as the Federal Council took the view that the project was "too narrow" and too focussed on the East-West transverse line and its feeder lines with too little done to improve Swiss railway system as a whole. In mid 1984 the Directorate General of the SBB established an expert group under the name "Rail 2000" with a mission to develop a new concept that not only improved the main axes, but would develop the whole Swiss rail network in the medium to long-term.

==== Rail 2000 ====
On 27 March 1985 SBB presented the Transport Department with a new project draft. This was met with a positive response from the political parties and associations; the Neue Zürcher Zeitung called the concept attractive, flexible and evolutionary. The aim of the concept was to connect the main hub stations in less than an hour (particularly Zürich, Bern and Lausanne) so that trains could arrive before the hour or half hour and depart again shortly thereafter. Trains therefore would have to run as fast as necessary to meet this object, not as fast as possible.

The federal parliament voted to approve Rail 2000 in May 1986. It granted CHF 5.4 billion for the Mattstetten–Rothrist new line between Olten and Bern and for a connection from near Herzogenbuchsee to Solothurn. Opposition formed in regions where the new line would be built. The opposition was directed not against the rail project, but against the route of the new line and the loss of arable land. Nevertheless, all major parties supported the project at a referendum in 1987 and it gained a majority of 57.0%.

== Development and implementation ==
By 1991, it was clear that costs had been massively underestimated. The full implementation of the project as planned in 1985 was now estimated to cost CHF 16 billion (1991 prices). In 1992 the Federal Council decreed a modification and staging of the project, with the cost of the first stage set at a maximum of CHF 7.4 billion. This revision had the following consequences:

- Cancellation of the proposed new line from Zürich Airport to Winterthur through the Brütten tunnel.
- The proposed upgrade of the Bern–Lausanne line south of Fribourg was restricted to the construction of the new Vauderens tunnel, abandoning a proposed new line from Siviriez to Villars-sur-Glâne.
- The proposed upgrade of the Hauenstein line was limited to the Adler tunnel, abandoning a proposed third tunnel through the Jura between Muttenz and Olten.
- Use of tilting trains instead of some line improvements proposed on the Jura foot line
- Avoiding platform extensions through the use of double deck coaches with a correspondingly higher density of seating

A further modification of the project was the decision to construct a new double track line in the tunnel from Zürich to Thalwil (Zimmerberg Base Tunnel Stage 1) instead of expanding the existing line from two to four lines to allow an expansion of capacity for the Zürich S-Bahn and long-distance trains connecting to Lucerne and the Gotthard line.

This project has been renamed as Rail 2000, Stage 1 and was completed on 12 December 2004. Its final cost was CHF 5.9 billion (1994 prices), less than the 1992 estimate for the redesigned project.

=== Implementation of Stage 1 ===
During the implementation of Rail 2000 sub-projects were brought into operation every 2 years from 1997. The biggest improvement, the commissioning of the new line, however, was not completed until 12 December 2004. Additional improvements included:

- Trains every half hour on some long-distance routes
- Same travel time between Geneva and Zürich via Bern and via Neuchâtel.
- Reduction of the travel time between Zürich and Bern by 13 minutes.

Due to the delayed introduction of the new ETCS train control system, the new and upgraded sections of line initially had conventional signalling technology with a maximum speed of only 160 km/h. Therefore, the journey on the central section between Zürich and Bern was shortened by only about 11 minutes instead of the planned 13 minutes. Since March 2007, the entire new line operated with ETCS, allowing an increase to the maximum speed to 200 km/h since December 2007. The resulting reduction in travel time has allowed the regular interval timetable to be stable as it can now cope with some delays.

As part of Rail 2000, in order to introduce language neutrality, the former regional local trains (German: Regionalzüge) were renamed Regio (abbr. R) and the regional fast trains (German: Schnellzüge; French: train direct; Italian: treno diretto) were renamed RegioExpress (Abbr. RE) or InterRegio (Abbr. IR).

== Projects ==
Rail 2000 included the following subprojects:

- Modernisation of the rolling stock
- More trains, including trains on main lines every half hour
- Better connections
- Increased capacity by extending double or four track sections to close gaps
- Separation of traffic at rail junctions and at main railway stations
- More services on both urban and regional lines
- Improvements to connections in central Zürich
- The Mattstetten–Rothrist new line and consequent reduction in travel time between Zürich and Bern from 69 to 58 minutes (56 minutes from the end of 2007).

=== New lines ===
The core of Rail 2000 was the 37 km long new line from Mattstetten to Rothrist between Bern and Olten, which was opened in December 2004. This allowed the following travel time reductions:

- Olten–Bern reduced from 40 minutes to 26 minutes
- Zürich–Bern reduced from 69 minutes to 56 minutes
- Basel–Bern reduced from 67 minutes to 55 minutes
- Lucerne–Bern reduced from 81 minutes (via Wolhusen and Langnau) to 60 minutes (via Sursee and Zofingen to the Mattstetten–Rothrist line)
- Olten–Biel/Bienne reduced from 41 minutes to 32 minutes (via NBS and upgraded Inkwil-Derendingen)
- Zürich–Bern–Geneva reduced from 2 hours 56 minutes to 2 hours 43 minutes
- Zürich–Biel/Bienne-Geneva reduced from 3 hours 9 minutes to 2 hours 42 minutes

=== Major projects ===
- Mattstetten–Rothrist new line, double line. Commissioned 2004; cost: CHF 1,679 million
- Reconstructed line between Derendingen and Inkwil (connection of Mattstetten–Rothrist line to Solothurn). Commissioned 2003; cost: CHF 107 million
- Zimmerberg Base Tunnel, Stage 1 (Zürich–Thalwil), second double line. Commissioned 2003; cost: CHF 945 million
- Adler Tunnel (Muttenz-Liestal on Hauenstein line), double line. Commissioned 2000; cost: CHF 387 million
- Vauderens Tunnel (Vauderens–Siviriez on Olten–Lausanne line), double line. Commissioned 2001; cost: CHF 71 million
- Deviation and duplication between Onnens–Bonvillars and Gorgier-St Aubin on Jura foot line. Commissioned 2001; cost: CHF 363 million
- Third track between Coppet and Geneva on Geneva–Lausanne line. Commissioned 2004; cost: CHF 285 million
- Expansion of the Zürich HB node (Total cost: CHF 544 million)
  - Platforms 3-9 extended to 420 meters
  - Sihlpost station extension (platforms 51-54), 320 metre long platforms
  - Station interlocking
  - Kohlendreieck substation
  - Herdern maintenance facility and car shed
  - Kohlendreieck grade separation
  - New bridge between station and Wipkingen line
  - Track work between station and Altstetten
  - Four tracks between station and Wiedikon/Zimmerberg Base Tunnel (separation of Zürich S-Bahn and long distance trains)
  - Löwenstrasse underground station extension (platforms 31-34)

=== Other projects ===
Other projects included:

- New connection at Aarburg between lines to Bern (Rothrist) and Lucerne (Zofingen)
- Capacity expansion between Wankdorf, Ostermundigen and Gümligen, near Bern, third track
- Platform expansion at Basel station
- Capacity expansion between Basel and Muttenz, third track
- Olten station expansion
- Capacity expansion between Olten, Olten East and Dulliken, third or fourth track
- Expansion of Aarau station
- Duplication of Aarau City Tunnel to add third and fourth track
- Third and fourth track added from Aarau to Rupperswil,
- Expansion of Zug station
- Duplication between Zug and Cham
- Duplication between Rotkreuz and Rotsee
- Additional tracks between Dietikon and Killwangen–Spreitenbach
- Third track south of Winterthur,
- Duplication between Goldach and Mörschwil
- Expansion of Landquart station
- Duplication between Bad Ragaz and Landquart

=== New Railway Link through the Alps NRLA ===
In parallel with the Rail 2000 projects, the NRLA project is upgrading the two major railway lines through the Swiss Alps: the Gotthard railway (including the new Gotthard Base Tunnel and the Ceneri Base Tunnel) and Lötschberg line (including the new Lötschberg Base Tunnel). The upgrade of Gotthard will shorten the journey between German-speaking Switzerland and Ticino by an hour. The Lötschberg base tunnel was opened in 2007, making a trip from Zürich to the canton of Valais in less than two hours possible; it has shortened the journey between Bern and Brig and Italy by about a quarter of an hour.

== Rail 2000, Stage 2 / Future development of rail infrastructure ==
The Federal Office of Transport (FOT) is currently reviewing the differing needs of the cantons and railways for a 2nd stage of Rail 2000. This, is being considered together with the federal government's overall review of funding for ongoing public transport projects, including the AlpTransit, high-speed connections to France and Germany and the Geneva cross-city line. The 2nd Stage of Rail 2000 is also called "Future development of rail projects" (German: Zukünftige Entwicklung der Bahnprojekte, ZEB). It is envisaged that this stage would be completed by 2030.

The Swiss Federal Railways outlined its ideas for the 2nd Stage in a press conference in April 2006 with the FOT. In principle, it preferred smaller extensions rather large tunnel projects. It emphasised the acceleration of the east-west link and the inclusion of Lausanne, Biel/Bienne, Interlaken and St. Gallen as nodes for the regular interval timetable in addition to Zürich and Bern. The following extensions are planned:

- CHF 1.7 billion for new track of the Zürich–Olten line
  - CHF 1,000 million for Chestenberg new line between Rupperswil and the Heitersberg tunnel
  - CHF 400 million for Eppenberg new line between Aarau and Daeniken
  - CHF 300 million for new track near Olten
- CHF 665 million for increasing capacity between Zürich and Winterthur
- CHF 260 million for higher speeds between Winterthur and St. Gallen and Constance
- CHF 350 million for new track near Bern
  - CHF 210 million for new track in Bern
  - CHF 140 million for partial duplication between Spiez and Interlaken
- CHF 140 million for grade separation in Liestal on the Hauenstein line
- CHF 320 million for increasing capacity in Lausanne
- CHF 225 million for higher speeds between Fribourg and Lausanne on the Olten–Lausanne line
- CHF 110 million for increasing speeds from 160 km/h to 200 km/h in the Valais on the Simplon line, including the installation of ETCS
- CHF 325 million for new track in various projects in Central Switzerland
- CHF 365 million for new track in Ticino

Under Stage 2, travel time from Zürich to both St. Gallen and Biel/Bienne would be reduced to less than an hour, as would travel time from Bern to Lausanne. These projects, according to SBB would cost approximately CHF 1.5 billion. Extension options are being considered.

SBB favoured not building several projects that were originally proposed for the first phase of Rail 2000 but were deferred when it was cut back:

- The third Jura tunnel between Basel and Olten (only the Adler tunnel between Muttenz and Liestal has been completed)
- The proposed new line between Zürich Airport and Winterthur through the Brütten tunnel
- The second stage of the Zimmerberg Base Tunnel connecting Litti (near Baar) on the approach line to the Gotthard Railway with Zürich and the proposed single-line Hirzel tunnel connecting Litti with Au or Wädenswil
- A tunnel parallel to the Heitersberg tunnel to provide a third and fourth track
- Conversion of Lucerne station into a through station by building a subterranean station and a connecting tunnel to the Zürich–Lucerne line at Ebikon

According to SBB, BLS has also defined its wishes. It envisages:

- Completion of outstanding work on the Lötschberg Base Tunnel (completion of the second track and the Steg branch)
- Duplication of the Bern–Neuchâtel line
