= Clock-face scheduling =

Type of public transport timetable

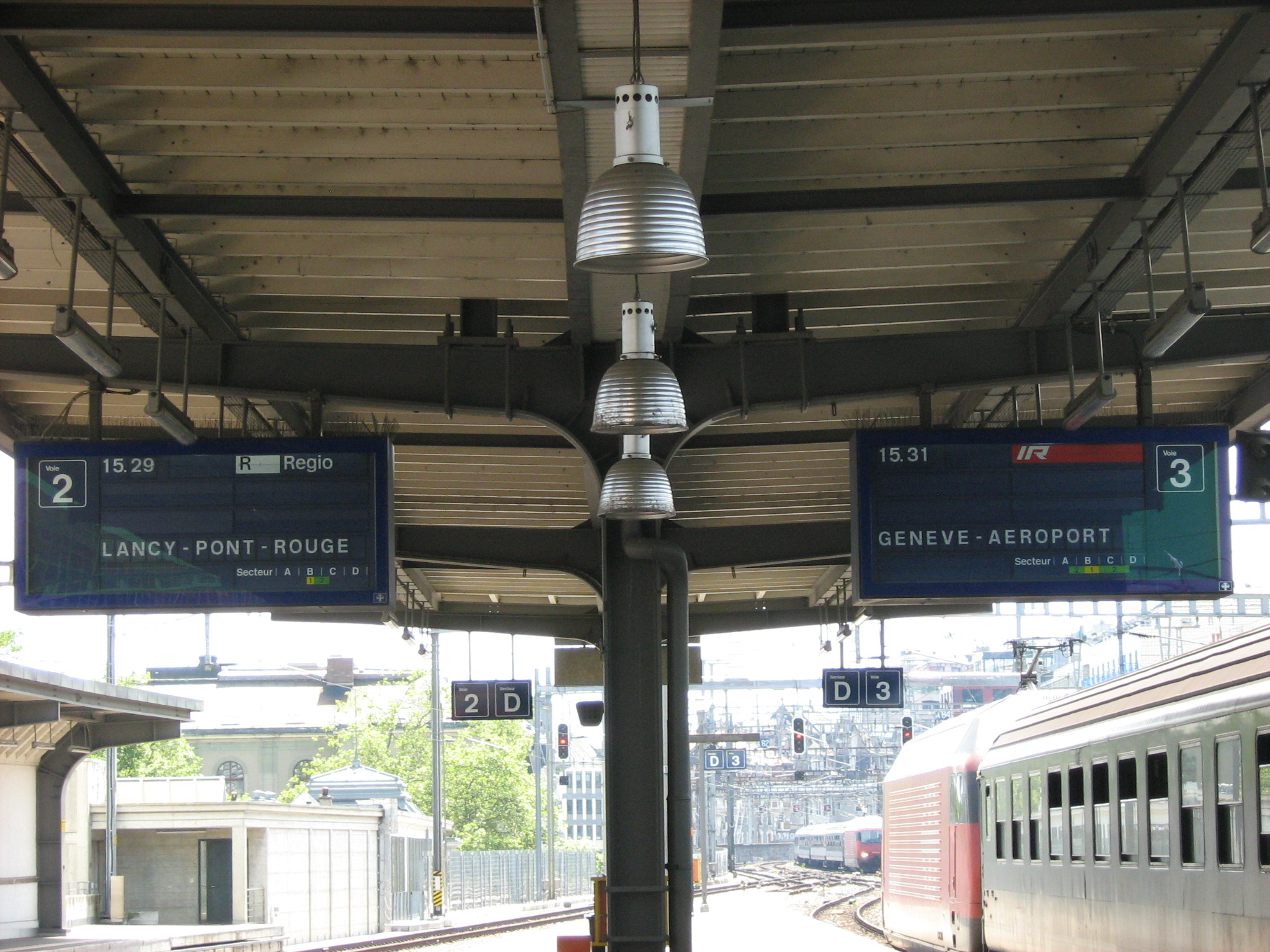
Example of integrated timetables between interregional and regional services on the Swiss network. The two trains are programmed to meet in the hub of Geneva around 15:30 and also share a platform to minimise transfer times.

A clock-face schedule, also cyclic schedule, is a timetable system under which public transport services run at consistent intervals, as opposed to a timetable that is purely driven by demand and has irregular headways. The name derives from the fact that departures take place at the same time or times during the day. For example, services with a half-hourly frequency might leave at 5:15, 5:45, 6:15, 6:45, 7:15, 7:45 etc.

The goal is to enhance the attractiveness and versatility of public transport. Clock-face schedules are easy for passengers to memorise because departure and arrival times occur at consistent intervals, repeating during the day. A regular repeating schedule over the whole day can also improve services during off-peak hours. Clock-face timetables can be attractive for transport operators because the repeating pattern can allow the more efficient use of personnel, infrastructure and vehicles, and also make resource-planning easier.

Repeating timetables were first developed at the end of the 19th century, for local public transport, such as trams, rapid transit, and trains in the vicinity of large cities like New York City. A clock-face schedule is used currently for railways in many countries such as the United Kingdom, Switzerland and Germany. It is also used for urban transport systems like the New York City Subway system and London Underground.

== Line-based ==
Individual lines can have a regular schedule, even without connections to other lines. Nevertheless, it could be necessary to co-ordinate the schedules of different modes of transport if links are made between them, such as at the terminal stop of a tram network if a journey can be continued by bus, so that passengers do not have to wait long at transfer point until the next service arrives.

Clock-face timetables can be attractive even if services provide no connections to other public transport because they allow a continuous use of vehicles and personnel.

Line-bound regular timetables are especially useful for lines with high service frequencies. If vehicles with the same destination follow each other in short intervals, transfer times are short even if there are delays. However, if the service intervals are 20 minutes or longer, it is important for schedules on each line to be officially co-ordinated. One simple way of doing that is to shift the departure times of one of the lines to match the other.

== Network-based ==
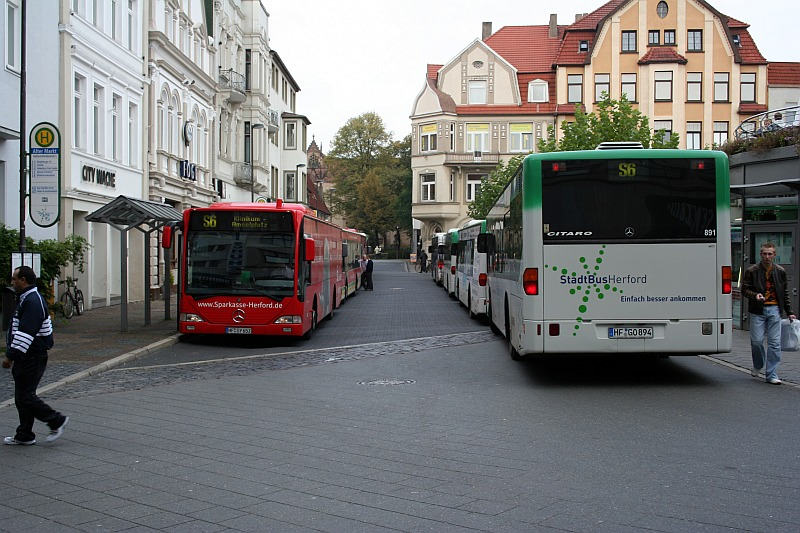
Buses meet in Herford, Alter Markt

An integrated schedule is a clock-face schedule that covers not individual lines but all public transport services in a given area. A characteristic of integrated clock-face timetables is that there is more than one central hub. A hub-and-spoke approach is then applied to the whole transport network.

Having several services meet at hubs where all of them arrive and leave at the same time is the most effective way of connecting multiple routes and modes. The goal is to reduce transfer times to a few minutes, with a default time of no more than five minutes.

In actual operation, the time span can be longer because of services running early or late, high passenger volume (such as rush hour), or the need to assist passengers with disabilities. Efficient operation is even more essential than normal with integrated clock-face timetabling. If the policy is to hold connecting services to ensure a connection with a late-running service, waiting times at interchange stops can become unattractive, and other services will run late as a consequence.

Examples of such networks are often night and city bus networks. The connections might be optimized only within the network but not for transfers to rail or intercity bus lines. Such concepts need purpose-built stations, which can handle high passenger volumes. The space constraints within cities can be a reason to use other concepts.

An integrated regular timetable with half-hourly or hourly headways requires routes on which a service ideally takes a little less than 30, 60 or 90 minutes to make it from one hub to another (accounting for a few minutes of changing, recovery, and waiting time at the hub). A service that takes 40 minutes would be bad because passengers and vehicles have to wait uselessly for their connections (unless the timetables at the different hubs are offset from each other to compensate, which is only practical for networks with very few hubs), and it generates nearly the same cost as a route that takes 54 minutes because vehicles and personnel cannot be used during the remaining 20 minutes. Therefore, when an integrated timetable is introduced running times might be cut or extended to meet the ideal duration.

=== Emergence of integrated timetables ===
The first integrated regular timetables were developed for railways. After the successful introduction of a line-bound regular timetable on one line in Switzerland in 1968, the development continued in the Netherlands. In 1970 and 1971, the Dutch Railways introduced a regular timetable with multiple hubs. In Germany, the first large-scale use of regular timetables was the InterCity network of 1979, which provided hourly long-distance services between cities. In 1982, a nationwide integrated regular timetable was introduced in Switzerland, which covered all but a few railway and bus lines. The base frequency was once an hour. The system was improved every two years and resulted in the Rail 2000 project of Swiss Federal Railways.

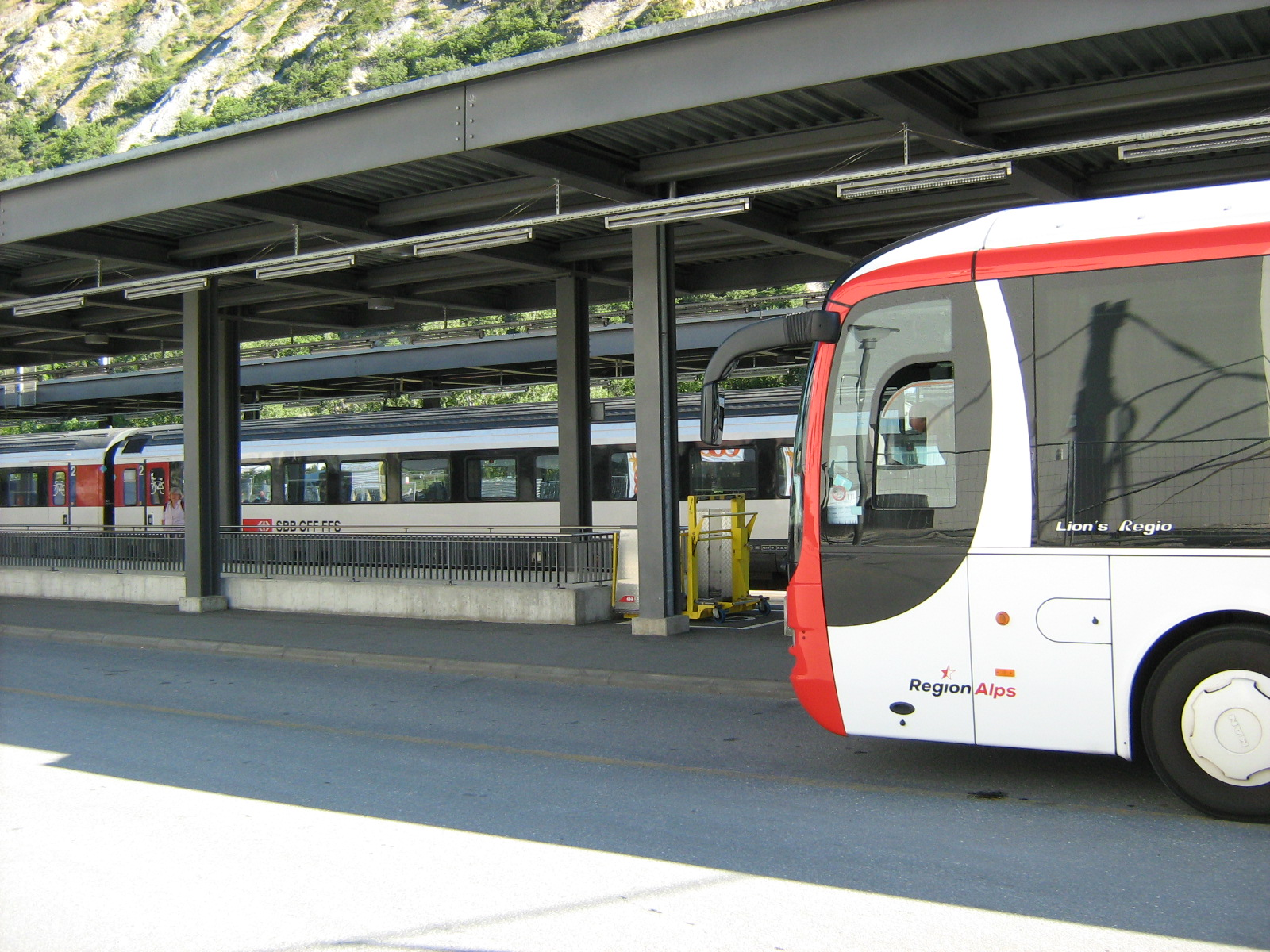
A regional bus service meets an interregional train service at Leuk (Switzerland) train station

=== Switzerland ===
Services on the Swiss railway network are integrated with one another and with other forms of public transport. Unlike its larger European neighbors, compact Switzerland has not developed a comprehensive high-speed rail network, with the running speed on its few stretches of relatively high-speed line being 200 km/h (124 mph). Instead, the priority is not so much the speeding up of trains between cities but the reduction of connection times throughout the nodal system. Swiss Federal Railways have adapted their infrastructure in such a way that journey times on main lines between hubs are multiples of 30 minutes so that on the hour or half-hour, all trains stand in the main stations at the same time, thus minimising connection times. Indeed, the Mattstetten–Rothrist line reduces journey times from Bern to Zurich from 72 minutes to 56 minutes in keeping with the clock-face scheduling. The Swiss approach is sometimes called "as fast as necessary" with a schedule being written mandating specific travel times and infrastructure later upgraded in line with the proposed schedule. This was the main idea behind the Bahn 2000 project and has also been used for the passenger travel through the NRLA tunnels.

However, on some single tracked lines the timetables may be 30/30 or 60/60 minutes, with the actual timetables being asymmetrical (such as 20/40 minutes), because passing loops are not positioned ideally, or alternate connections at either ends have to be reached.

=== Germany ===
Since the mid-1990s, the states of Germany are responsible for Regional Rail Provision and have introduced integrated timetables, running hourly or every two hours, such as Allgäu-Schwaben-Takt (commencing in 1993), Rheinland-Pfalz-Takt (1994) and NRW-Takt (1998). Local transport associations have introduced regular timetables with base frequencies of 20 or 30 minutes, which are partially changed to 10 or 5 or even 15 or 7.5 minutes when locations are served by overlapping multiple lines. In some areas, local buses are also integrated, such as RegioTakt in North Rhine-Westphalia and in parts of Lower Saxony.

These developments have led to "integrated timetable islands", which all adhere to the Germany-wide symmetry minute (58½), which is used also in Switzerland and in other European countries, while local public transport in (mostly rural) areas in between still adheres to an irregular, demand-driven timetable. Major problems exist in regions where transport associations of different states interact (like in Osnabrück). In order to introduce a Germany-wide integrated regular timetable, the alliance "Deutschland-Takt" was founded in 2008. In 2015, the Federal Ministry of Transport had a feasibility study conducted for a Germany-wide integrated timetable ("Deutschlandtakt") Similar to the Swiss example, where infrastructure demands are derived from the desired timetable and not vice versa, the Deutschlandtakt calls for several new and upgraded lines. Introduction of the Deutschlandtakt has become a declared political goal of successive governments on the federal Level around 2020, and detailed desired timetables have been drafted.

=== Elsewhere ===
In 2026, the United Kingdom government granted £6 million for a trial of clock-face scheduling in the Peak District.
