= Symmetry minute =

Time point in clock-face timetable

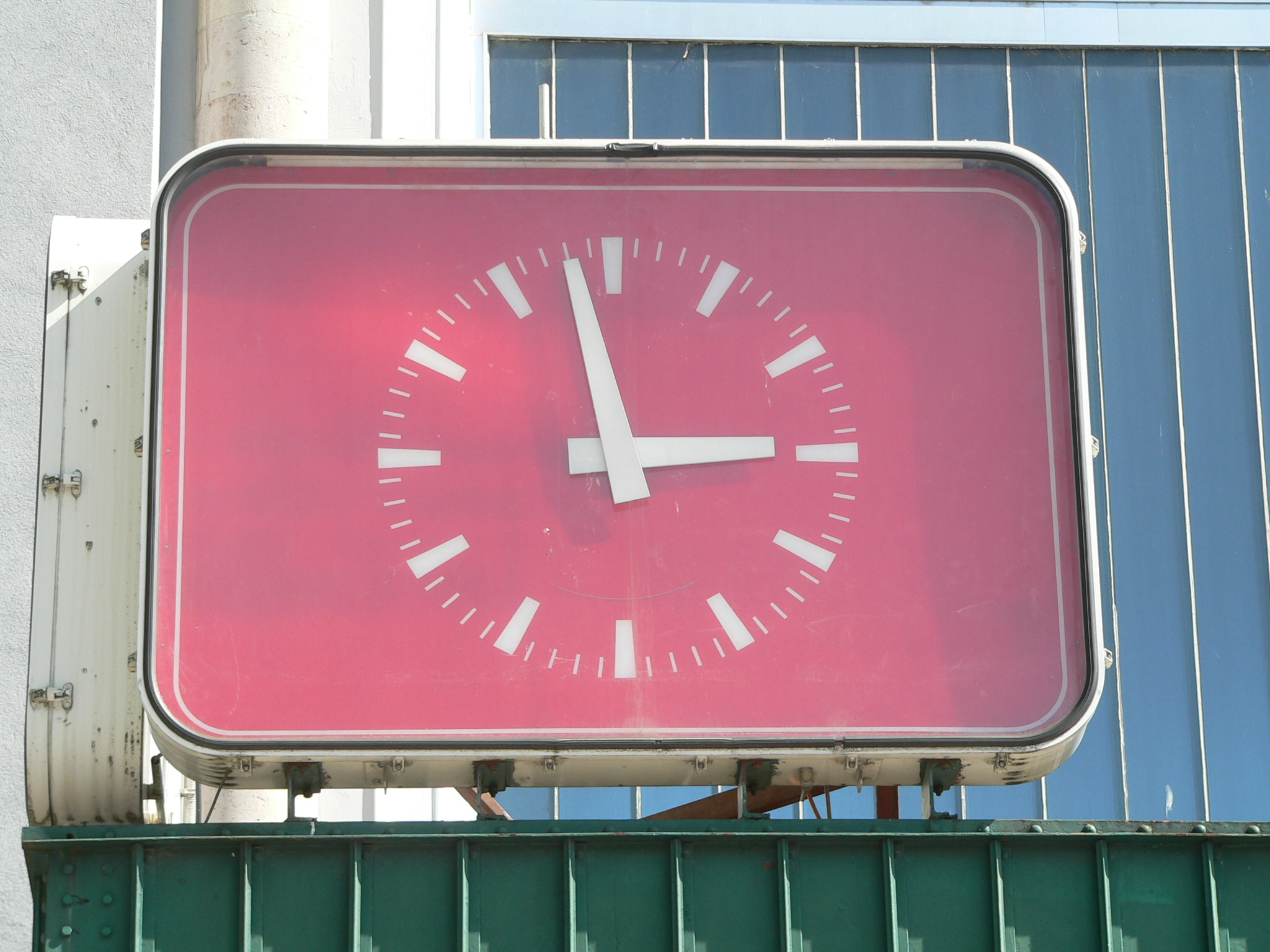
Shortly before every full hour in central European countries using a clock-face timetable, many trains meet and pass the corresponding train in the other direction.

The symmetry minute is a significant time point in the clock face timetables used by many public transport operators. At this point in the cycle, a train in a clock-face timetable meets its counterpart travelling in the opposite direction on the same line. If this crossing time is constant across a network, connecting times between lines are kept consistent in both directions.

A rail net on an hourly cycle with symmetry at minute 0

At the symmetry time, the timetable is mirrored in both directions. At the ends of the line, the center of the turnaround time coincides with the symmetry minute. The distance between two consecutive symmetry times is equal to half the cycle time, so on an hourly schedule, opposite trains on the same line cross every 30 minutes. On a two-hour cycle, there is a symmetry time every hour.

In principle, a train-encounter can be set at any time. However, at the transition between two networks or lines, it is expedient to set uniform symmetry minutes, to create a symmetrical connection relation. For the long-distance cycle systems of ÖBB and SBB, the Forschungsgesellschaft für Straßen- und Verkehrswesen für Deutschland (Research Association for Roads and Traffic for Germany) recommends minute 58, so a four-minute minimum connecting time results in a departure at minute 0. Meanwhile, most railways in Central Europe and a number of other transport operators have established the symmetry minute 58½, for a three-minute hold time before a departure at minute 0. Shorter cycles have additional symmetry minutes, shifted by half the cycle time. So an hourly cycle has symmetries at minutes 28½ and 58½, a 30-minute cycle has symmetries at minutes 13½, 28½, 43½ and 58½, and so on.

The following table shows the departure times in opposite directions for an hourly cycle, using the 58½ symmetry minute (the most common in Central Europe). The other departure times for shorter cycles can be calculated from it. The last line gives the meeting times.

| Arrival minute | 58½ | 00 | 03 | 06 | 09 | 12 | 13½ | 15 | 18 | 21 | 24 | 27 | 28½ | ↰ |
| Departure return journey minute | 58½ | 57 | 54 | 51 | 48 | 45 | 43½ | 42 | 39 | 36 | 33 | 30 | 28½ | ↲ |
| Passing at ...-min.-Clocking | 120 | | | 15 | | | 30 | | | 15 | | | 60 | |
