= Mattstetten–Rothrist new line =

Swiss higher-speed railway line

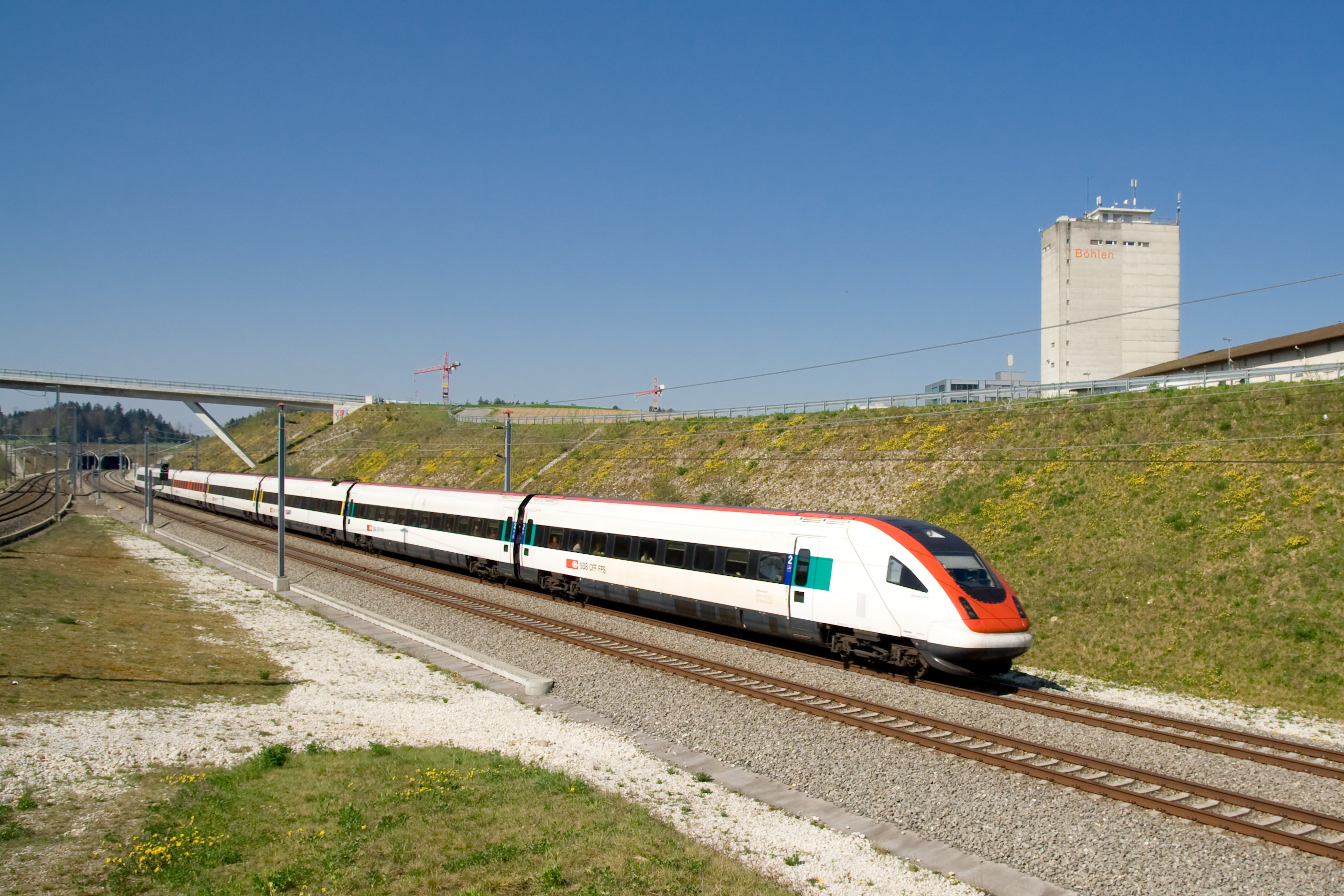
- Intercity tilting train on the Mattstetten–Rothrist line

Overview
- Termini: Olten; Bern

Technical
- Line length: 45.079 km (28.011 mi)
- Number of tracks: 2
- Track gauge: 1,435 mm (4 ft 8 1/2 in)
- Minimum radius: 3,000 m (9,843 ft)
- Electrification: 15 kV/16.7 Hz AC overhead catenary
- Operating speed: 200 km/h (125 mph)
- Maximum incline: 2.0%

The Mattstetten–Rothrist new line (Neubaustrecke Mattstetten-Rothrist) is Switzerland's first railway to reach speeds above 160 km/h (100 mph) in regular operations, running between Mattstetten and Rothrist. It forms most of the Olten–Bern railway line, which makes up over half of the trunk route connecting Switzerland's main city, Zürich and its capital, Bern. The new line opened on 12 December 2007, as the centrepiece of the Rail 2000 project, a comprehensive upgrade of Swiss railways.

The line is almost 52 kilometres (32 mi) long, with one branch. At Wanzwil junction, a 10-kilometre (6.2 mi) upgraded former local line to Solothurn connects to the rest of the Jura foot railway line (to Biel/Bienne, Neuchâtel, Yverdon and Geneva). The line has a maximum speed of 200 kilometres per hour (120 mph) and has reduced the travel time between major Swiss hubs of Bern, Basel and Zurich to under an hour, allowing the regular interval timetable (German: Taktfahrplan) to be implemented, where both express and stopping trains on all lines arrive and leave on the hour at Bern and Zurich stations, allowing a great number of convenient connections. The line was the longest new line built in Switzerland since 1926. Construction began in April 1996 and the last piece of rail was put into place on 30 April 2004 at the Bern-Solothurn canton border at Inkwil on the connection to Solothurn.

The Mattstetten–Rothrist was the first in Switzerland to put the European Train Control System (ETCS) into regular operation. This was originally planned for December 2004 but had to be repeatedly postponed because of technical problems. On 2 July 2006 testing at night was started and trains ran from 22:30 at up to 160 km/h (99 mph) with ETCS; from 23 July testing started at 21:30. Switching from conventional signalling with external signals to in-cab ETCS signalling was successively brought into operation and on 18 March 2007, trains began to run with full ETCS Level 2 signalling at up to 160 km/h (99 mph); since December 2007 they have run at up to 200 km/h (124 mph). The ETCS trackside equipment consists of a Radio Block Center, the required balises and an electronic interlocking.

== See also ==
- High-speed rail in Switzerland
