= NRLA =

Swiss rail project

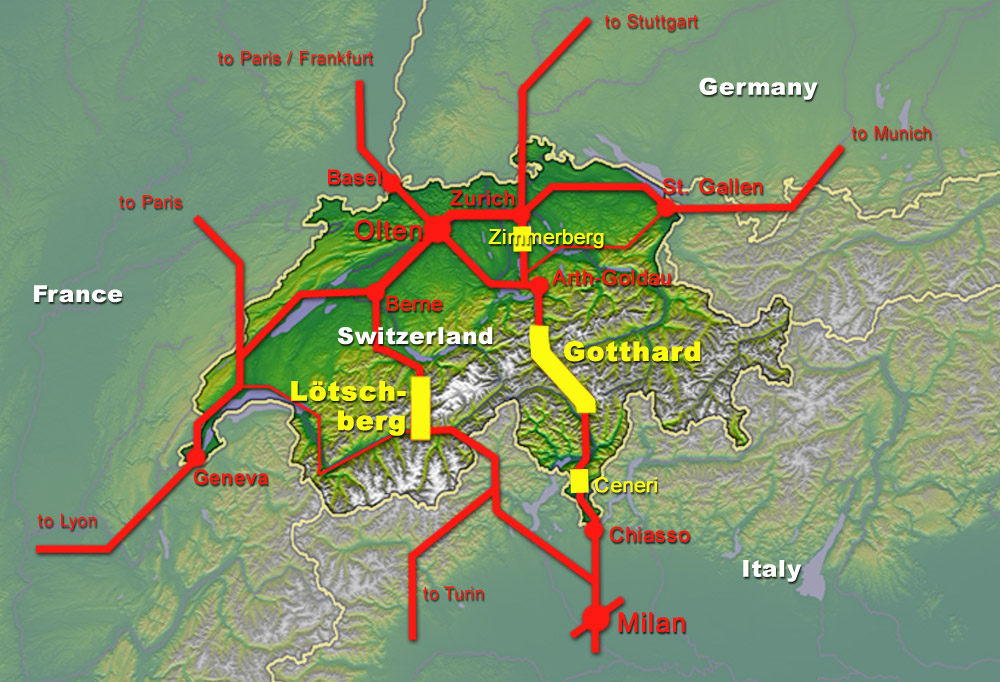
The NRLA project is the centrepiece of the Central European rail network.

The New Railway Link through the Alps (NRLA; German: Neue Eisenbahn-Alpentransversale, NEAT, French: nouvelle ligne ferroviaire à travers les Alpes, NLFA, Italian: Nuova ferrovia transalpina, NFTA), is a Swiss construction project for faster north–south rail links across the Swiss Alps. It consists of two axes with several improvements along these rails including three new base tunnels several hundred metres below the existing apex tunnels, the 57-kilometre (35 mi) Gotthard Base Tunnel, the 35-kilometre (22 mi) Lötschberg Base Tunnel, and the 15-kilometre (9.3 mi) Ceneri Base Tunnel. Swiss Federal Railways subsidiary AlpTransit Gotthard AG and BLS AG subsidiary BLS Alp Transit AG (now BLS Netz AG) were founded for this project and built the tunnels.

The total projected cost of the project was CHF 12.189 billion at its 1998 start; in December 2015, its final cost was projected to be CHF 17.900 billion. The 1998 projected total cost of the Gotthard Base Tunnel was CHF 6.323 billion; in December 2015, its final cost was projected to be CHF 9.560 billion. It opened on 1 June 2016, and became operational on 11 December of that year. The Ceneri Base Tunnel was opened on 3 September 2020 and became fully operational in December 2020 and is an important feeder for the Gotthard Base Tunnel. A decision to fully complete the second tube of the Lötschberg Base Tunnel was made in early-2024, with an estimated cost of CHF 1.7 billion. Construction is expected to extend from 2026 to 2033.

== Political background ==
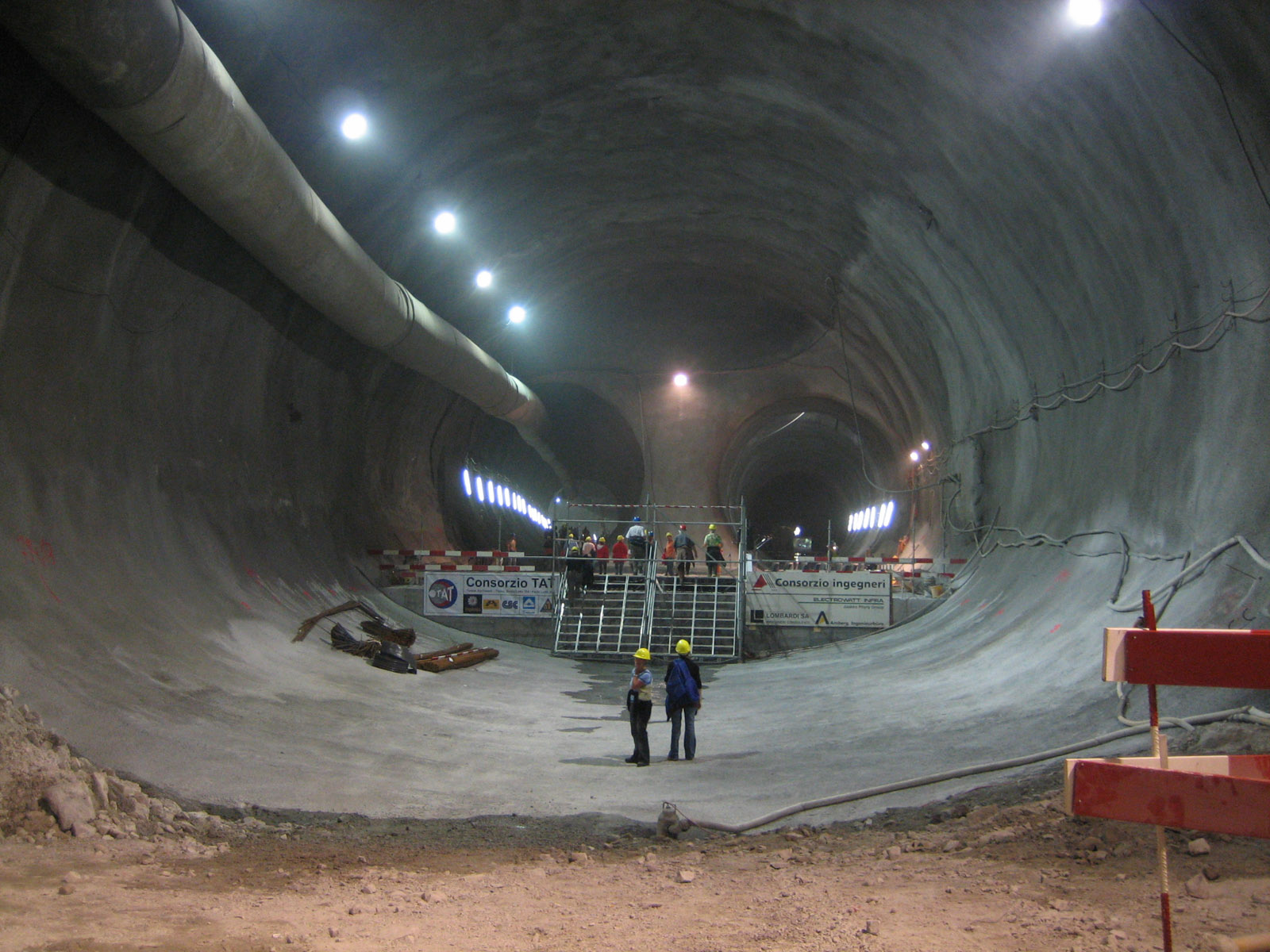
Three-way junction under construction in the Gotthard Base Tunnel in 2006

During late-1980s and early-1990s negotiations with the European Economic Community (the predecessor of the EU), Switzerland demanded a limitation on transalpine truck traffic. When the EEC refused, Swiss negotiators instead proposed a heavy-vehicle fee (HVF), a kilometre-based tax on freight vehicles, for all lorries above 3.5 tonnes and offered to build a high-speed rail link through the Alps for intermodal freight transport.

Swiss voters approved the rail link in a 27 September 1992 mandatory referendum. The EU accepted the Swiss offer in 2000, but requested that the extant 28-tonne weight limit for lorries be raised to 48 tonnes. The parties eventually compromised on a 40-tonne weight limit. The bilateral Land Transport Agreement with the European Union was signed, agreeing to an increase of the kilometer-based tax (HVF; German: LSVA, French: RPLP, Italian: TTPCP) on HGVs from 1.6 ct/tkm to 1.8 ct/tkm when the NRLA was completed. The condition was deemed fulfilled at the completion of the first track of the Lötschberg Base Tunnel in 2007.

Other relevant Swiss legislation includes the 1994 Alps initiative, which prohibits road-building in the Alps and encourages the transport of as many transalpine goods as possible by rail rather than road, and the 1998 Traffic Transfer Act, which sets an ideal maximum number of trucks crossing the Alps by road. Meeting this goal requires a fully functional NRLA rail link.

The original plans for the NRLA were to construct only one main base tunnel, but regional disputes prevented a choice between the two options and threatened to jeopardize the entire project. The Swiss Federal Council therefore decided in 1995 to build two base tunnels (Gotthard and Lötschberg) simultaneously.

In 1998, the total projected cost of the NRLA project was CHF 12.189 billion; in December 2015, the final cost was projected to be CHF 17.900 billion. The projected cost of its centerpiece, the Gotthard Base Tunnel, was CHF 6.323 billion in 1998; in December 2015, the tunnel's cost was an estimated CHF 9.560 billion. The 1998 cost of the Lötschberg axis was an estimated CHF 3.214 billion; in December 2015, it was an estimated CHF 4.237 billion.

Swiss voters approved the NRLA project on 27 September 1992, with 63.6% support.

Two years later on 20 February 1994, the Swiss populace unexpectedly also accepted with 51.9% support the Alps protecting initiative, a federal popular initiative initiated by just a few private citizens. This was despite neither the Federal Council nor the two parliamentary chambers endorsing the initiative, and their not even considering providing a counterproposal to the populace as they usually do when they oppose an initiative.

Another mandatory referendum was held on 19 November 1998 about the creation of funds for four major public-transport projects (German: FinöV-Fonds, French: Fonds FTP, Italian: Fondo FTP), funding them with time-limited CHF 30 billion fund of which the NRLA would receive 13.6 billion. Another major project was the Bahn 2000 project regarding the modernization of the railways. The Federal Council's request was approved with 63.5% support. The fund is replenished primarily by the previously mentioned kilometre-based tax on heavy-goods vehicles (HVF) and partially by taxes on gasoline originally intended for road-building, a small fraction of the VAT revenues, and funds from the general budget of the Swiss Confederation.

The bilateral agreements with the EU containing the 40-tonne limit and the implementation of the HVF were finally accepted by the Swiss populace on 21 May 2000 with 67.2% support in a federal optional referendum initiated by opposing political parties.

== Gotthard axis ==
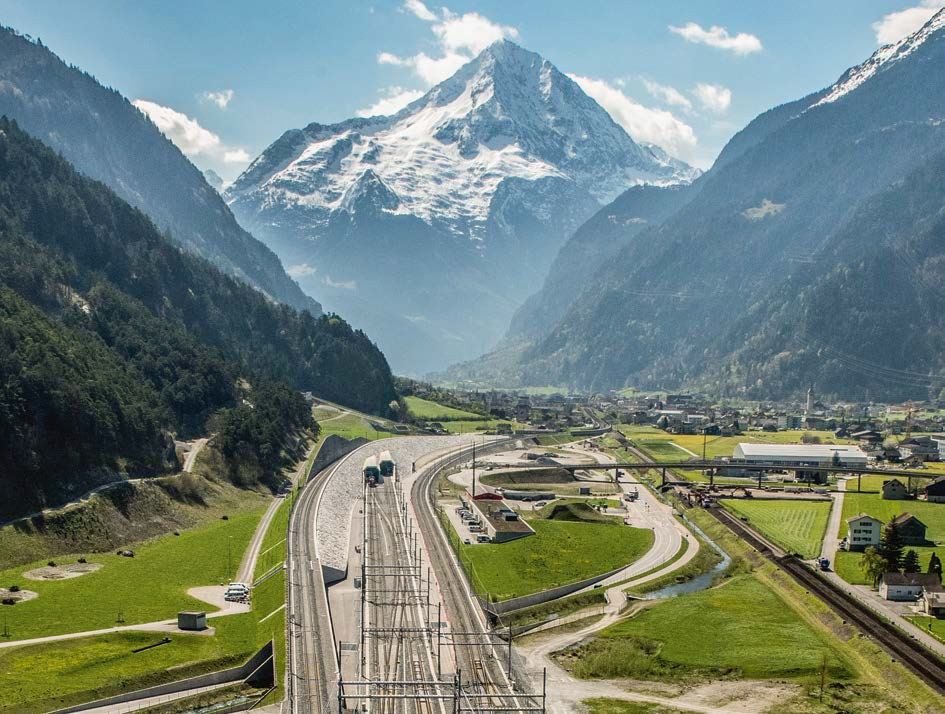
Called "the project of the century", the Gotthard Base Tunnel is the first flat route through any major mountain range, from the northern plains (here in Erstfeld) to the southern plains. In the background here looms the majestic 3,073-metre-high (10,082 ft) Bristen mountain.

The Gotthard axis consists of the Gotthard Base Tunnel (GBT), the partially operational Zimmerberg Base Tunnel, the Ceneri Base Tunnel (CBT), and surface connections. It was built by AlpTransit Gotthard under contract from the Swiss Federal Government. The axis is the first flat trans-alpine rail link, with a maximum elevation of 550 metres (1,800 ft) above sea level.

This enables a high-speed link through the Alps with a top speed of 250 km/h (160 mph), reducing travel time between Zürich and Milan from previously four hours to currently three-and-a-half hours.

The 57.1-kilometre (35.5 mi) Gotthard Base Tunnel is the world's longest and deepest traffic tunnel, as was the original 15-kilometre (9.3 mi) Gotthard Tunnel at its completion in 1881. It consists of two parallel single-track tunnels, connected by 178 cross-connections. There are two emergency stations in each tunnel, each connected to the corresponding opposite-tunnel emergency station. These stations are equipped with water supplies to refill firefighter and rescue trains. One (Porta Alpina) was proposed as an 800m deep rail station, but that proposal was rejected on both economic and technical grounds. AlpTransit Gotthard handed the completed tunnel over to the Swiss government on 31 May 2016. It was formally opened in a ceremony the next day, during which the tunnel was conveyed to its operator: Swiss Federal Railways (SBB CFF FFS).

== Lötschberg axis ==
The Lötschberg axis, with the Lötschberg Base Tunnel (LBT) in the Bernese Alps, was built by BLS Alp Transit. It supports the western transit network via Basel, Olten, Bern, Brig, Domodossola and Milan. The tunnel replaces the existing higher-altitude 1913 14.6-kilometre (9.1 mi) Lötschberg Tunnel for most traffic. The 34.6-kilometre-long (21.5 mi) base tunnel opened to traffic on 7 December 2007; it was the first part of the NRLA to be delivered, but is only partially completed. Because of NRLA cost overruns, funding for the axis was diverted to the Gotthard Base Tunnel and only one of the tunnel's two bores has been completed and is fully equipped for rail use. 14 kilometers of the other bore are completed; 14 kilometers are excavated but not equipped, and 7 kilometers have not been excavated. High-speed switches allow the completed 40% of the second bore to be used as a passing track, but the 21 kilometres (13 mi) of single track without passing loops complicates operations and greatly reduces the line capacity. Trains are scheduled by batches in each direction which are separated by long intervals; trains more than seven minutes late are routed via the old line or must wait for the next available timetable slot in their direction in the tunnel, causing major further delays. A planning contract for the completion of the second track of the LBT was awarded in 2016. The resulting plan was presented in Spring 2019, with options of either only fitting out the existing 14 km of unequipped tunnels or fully completing the second tube. In early-2024 the choice was made to go for the full option, with an estimated cost of CHF 1.7 billion and an expected delivery date of 2033. That choice is naturally more expensive and will take two years longer, but it provides a much higher capacity and also avoids fully closing the line for eight months.

The second part of the Lötschberg axis is the Simplon Tunnel, completed in 1905 as a 20-kilometre-long (12 mi) single-track base tunnel and augmented with a second bore in 1921. It connects Upper Valais to Northern Italy's Piedmont region.

== See also ==
- Rail transport in Switzerland
- History of rail transport in Switzerland
- High-speed rail in Switzerland
