= Mittellandlinie =

Swiss railway line

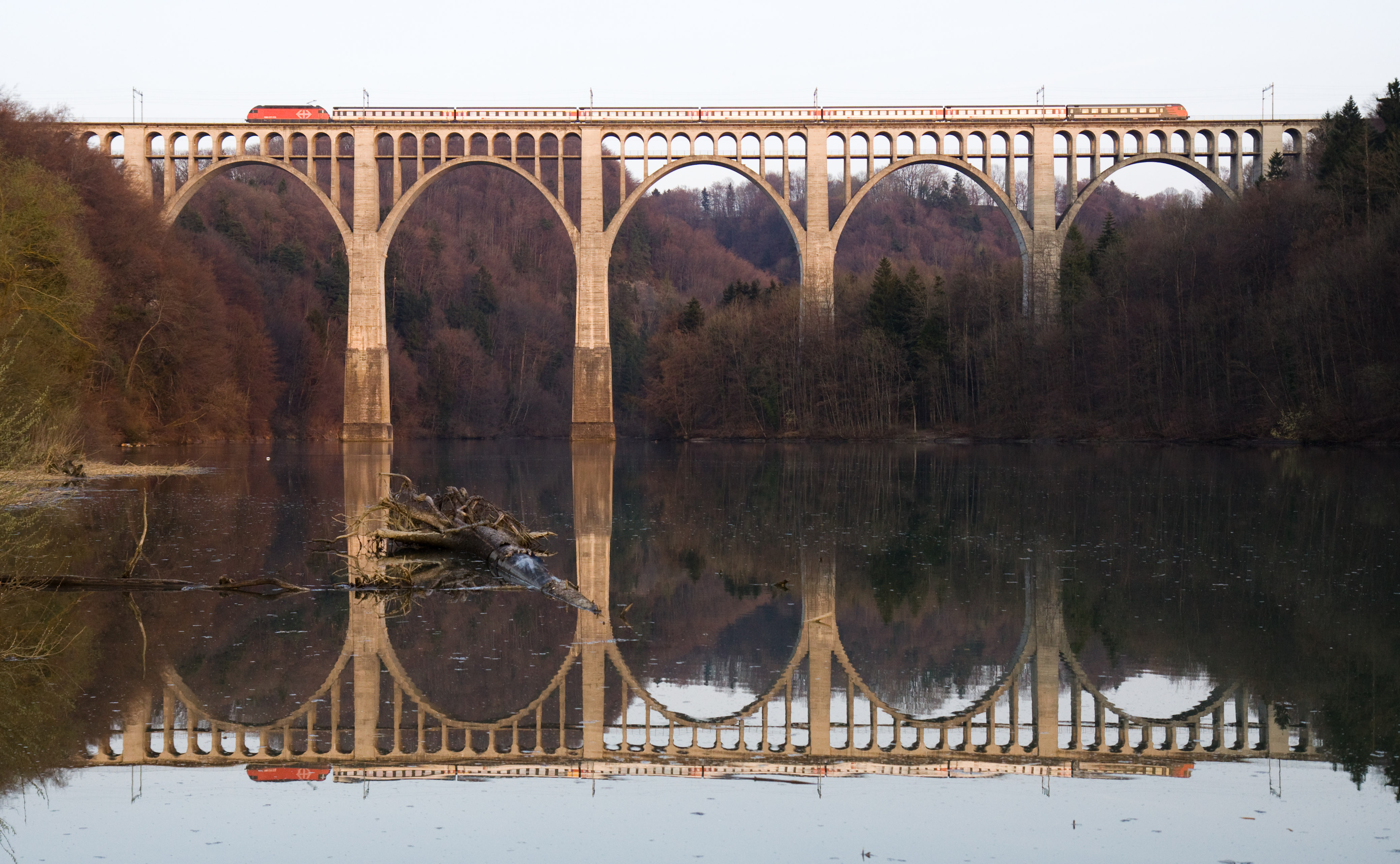
Mittellandlinie

The Mittellandlinie ("Midland line") is a railway route in Switzerland. It runs from Olten via Bern and Fribourg to Lausanne.

The Olten–Bern railway was completed in 1858 and two years later the Lausanne–Bern railway was opened. In addition, the Mattstetten–Rothrist new line was opened in 2004, which together with the Born Railway and the Grauholz line, forms a high-speed line between Olten and Bern.
