= Lötschberg railway =

Key western Swiss transport link

Lötschberg railway line
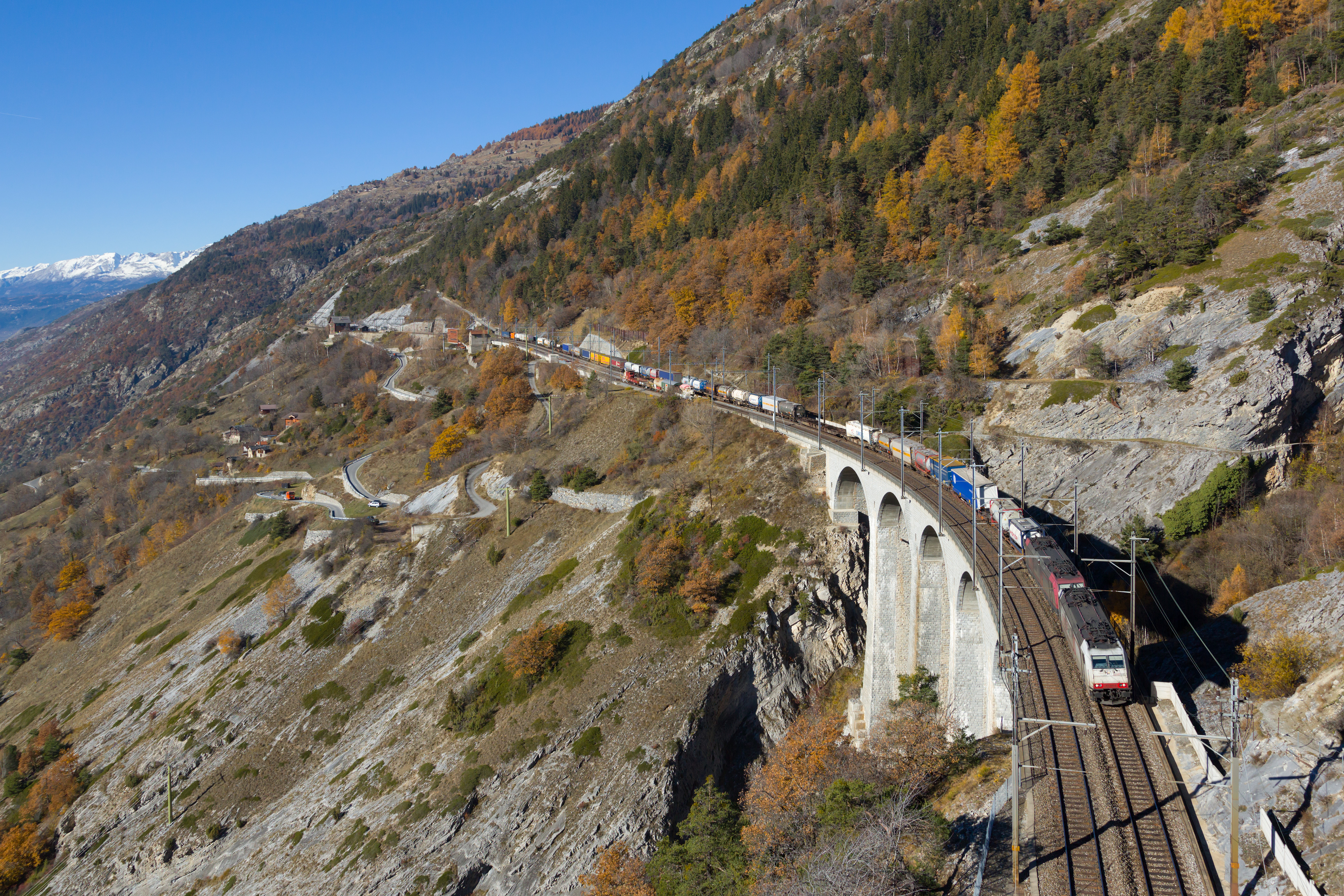
- Luogelkin viaduct near Hohtenn

Overview
- Status: running daily
- Owner: BLS AG
- Locale: Bern and Valais
- Termini: Spiez; Brig
- Stations: 12

Service
- Type: Commuter and tourist railway
- System: nationally integrated
- Services: 1
- Operator(s): BLS

History
- Opened: 1913

Technical
- Line length: 74 km (46 mi)
- Number of tracks: 2
- Rack system: None
- Track gauge: 1,435 mm (4 ft 8 1/2 in)
- Minimum radius: 300 m (980 ft)
- Electrification: 15 kV/16.7 Hz AC overhead catenary
- Highest elevation: 1,240 m (4,068 ft)
- Maximum incline: 2.7%

The Lötschberg line is a railway in Switzerland, connecting Spiez in the canton of Bern with Brig in the canton of Valais. It crosses the Bernese Alps, from the Bernese Oberland to Upper Valais, through the Lötschberg Tunnel in the middle of the line. Together with the Simplon Tunnel south of Brig, it constitutes one of the major railways through the Alps and an important north-south axis in Europe. The Lötschberg axis is backed by the lower and longer Lötschberg Base Tunnel, part of the New Railway Links through the Alps project.

The line is famous for its double loop of spiral tunnels in the Kander Valley on its northern approach to the Lötschberg Tunnel and the climb out of the Rhone Valley along a steep mountainside through numerous tunnels and viaducts on the southern approach. Its culminating point is 1,240 metres (4,070 ft) above sea level, making it the highest adhesion and standard gauge railway in Switzerland.

== Location ==
The Lötschberg line, with the 14.6-kilometre (9.1 mi) long Lötschberg Tunnel at its heart, allows direct service from Bern to Brig, the latter city being also reachable by bypassing the Bernese Alps via Lausanne, using the Swiss part of the Simplon railway. It is the second most important north-south link through the Swiss Alps after the Gotthard railway. Together with the Simplon Tunnel and the Italian part of the Simplon line, it also connects the Swiss Plateau to Northern Italy. The more recent Lötschberg Base Tunnel replaces most of the open-air section of the mountain line and allows faster travel between Bern and Brig. Both tunnels run below the 2,690-metre (8,830 ft)-high Lötschen Pass of the Lötschberg region.

The beginning of the Lötschberg line is in the rail node of Spiez, where it connects with the GoldenPass line from Zweisimmen and with the Lake Thun line from major rail hubs in northern Europe, including Basel and Bern, to Interlaken. From there the line runs generally due south through the Kander valley, passing through Mülenen, Reichenbach and Frutigen, where the north portal of the Base Tunnel is located. After the Kander viaduct, the mountain line continues towards Kandergrund and Mitholz. The line turns northward after the loop at Mitholz and climbs out of the valley on the western flanks of the Ärmighorn. A spiral tunnel turns the line southward again, before it reaches Kandersteg, the last station on the northern approach. Two kilometres (1.2 mi) after Kandersteg, the line reaches the north portal of the Lötschberg Tunnel. Immediately after the south portal is the station of Goppenstein, at the lower end of the Lötschental valley. The line passes through another tunnel before it turns in an easterly direction to the southern flank of the Bietschhorn just before reaching Hohtenn Station, 450 metres (1,480 ft) above the Rhone. The line then continues eastward, descending towards Brig, crossing the wild valleys of Jolital, Bietschtal, Baltschiedertal and Gredetschtal, and passing through Ausserberg, Eggerberg and Lalden. The line ends at Brig, where it connects with the Matterhorn Gotthard Bahn from Zermatt to Disentis and the Simplon line from Geneva and Lausanne to Domodossola, and further to Milan. The south portal of the Base Tunnel lies on the Rhone valley floor, below Ausserberg, the base line passing through Visp before reaching Brig. The entire Lötschberg line is 74 km (46.0 mi) long and culminates at 1,240 metres (4,070 ft) above sea level. The open-air section culminates at Goppenstein at 1,217 metres (3,993 ft) and the northern approach culminates south of Kandersteg at 1,200 metres (3,900 ft). It is the highest line in Switzerland that is both an adhesion and a standard gauge railway, therefore usable by standard InterCity trains. The journey from Spiez to Brig lasts 72 minutes on the mountain line and 35 minutes on the base line.

The Lötschberg line stretches over the Bernese Oberland region of the northern Alps and the Upper Valais region of the inner Alps. While the north side of the Bernese Alps is wet and exposed, the south side is dry and sheltered by the high mountains of both the Bernese and Pennine Alps. This results in marked climatic, topographical and cultural contrasts between the northern and southern approaches. The line, especially its southern part, lies in close proximity to the Jungfrau-Aletsch area, a largely glaciated region between the Lötschen and Grimsel passes.

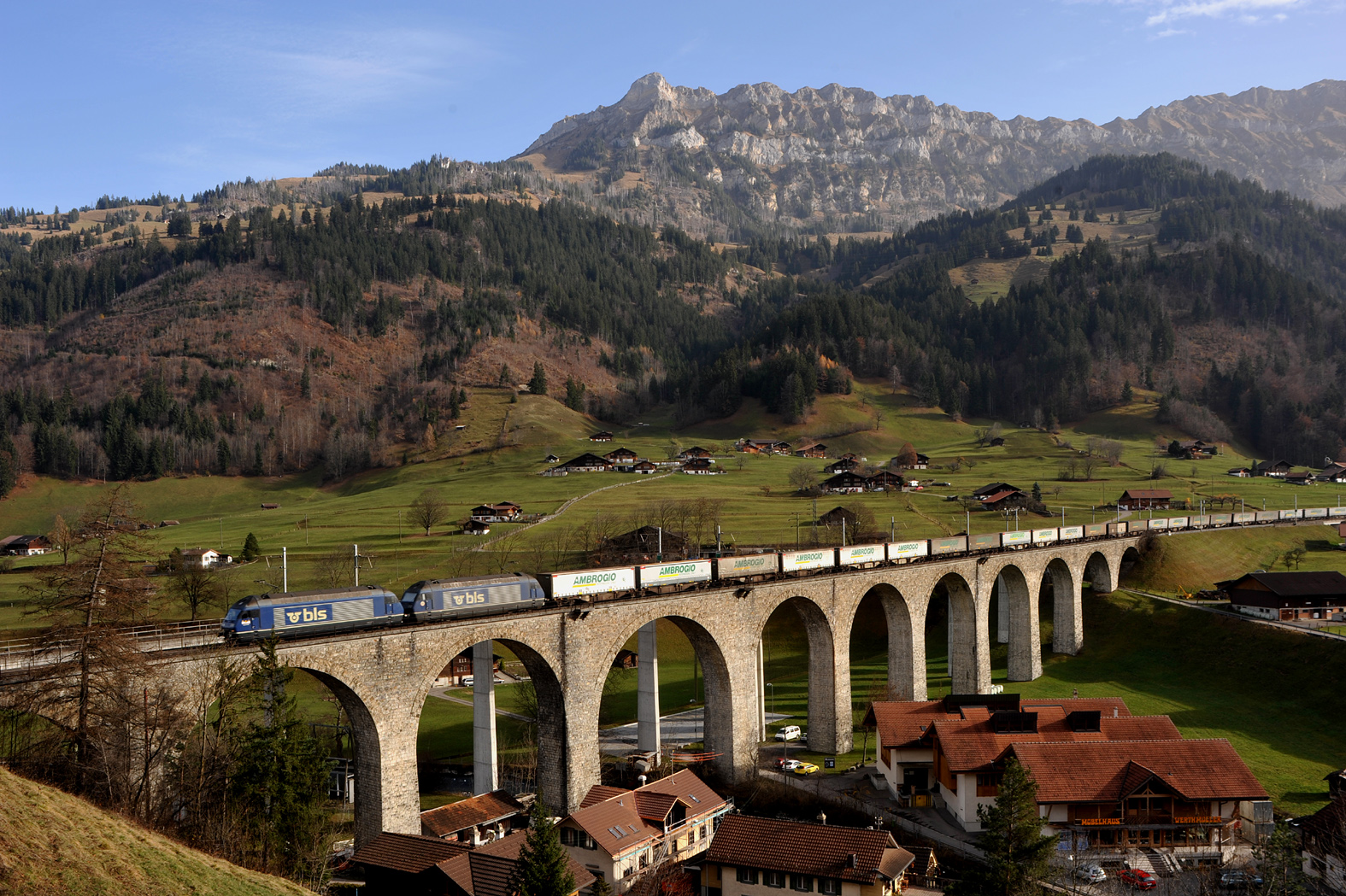
Re 465s on the Kander viaduct (northern approach)

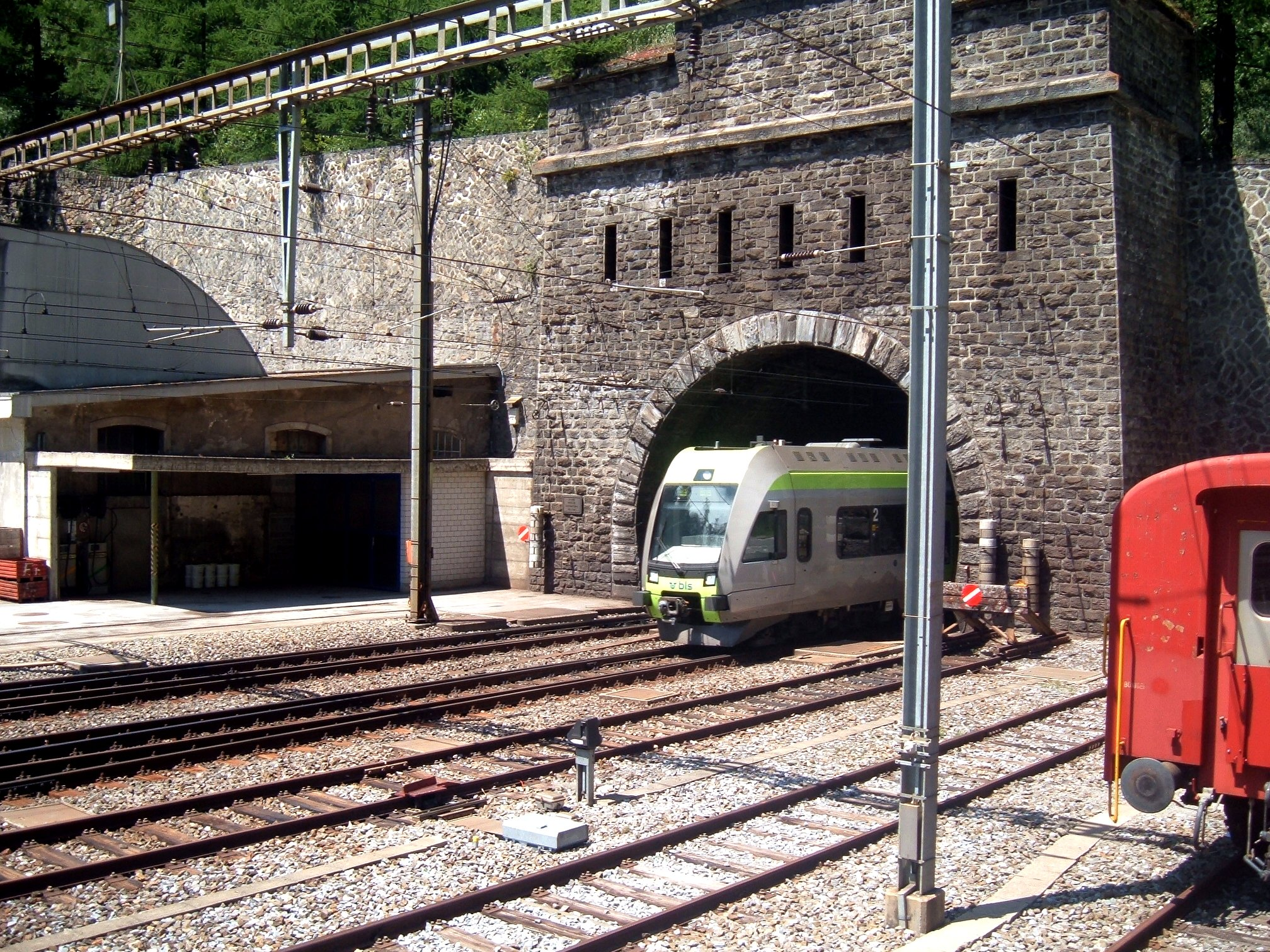
Lötschberg Tunnel from Goppenstein (culminating point)

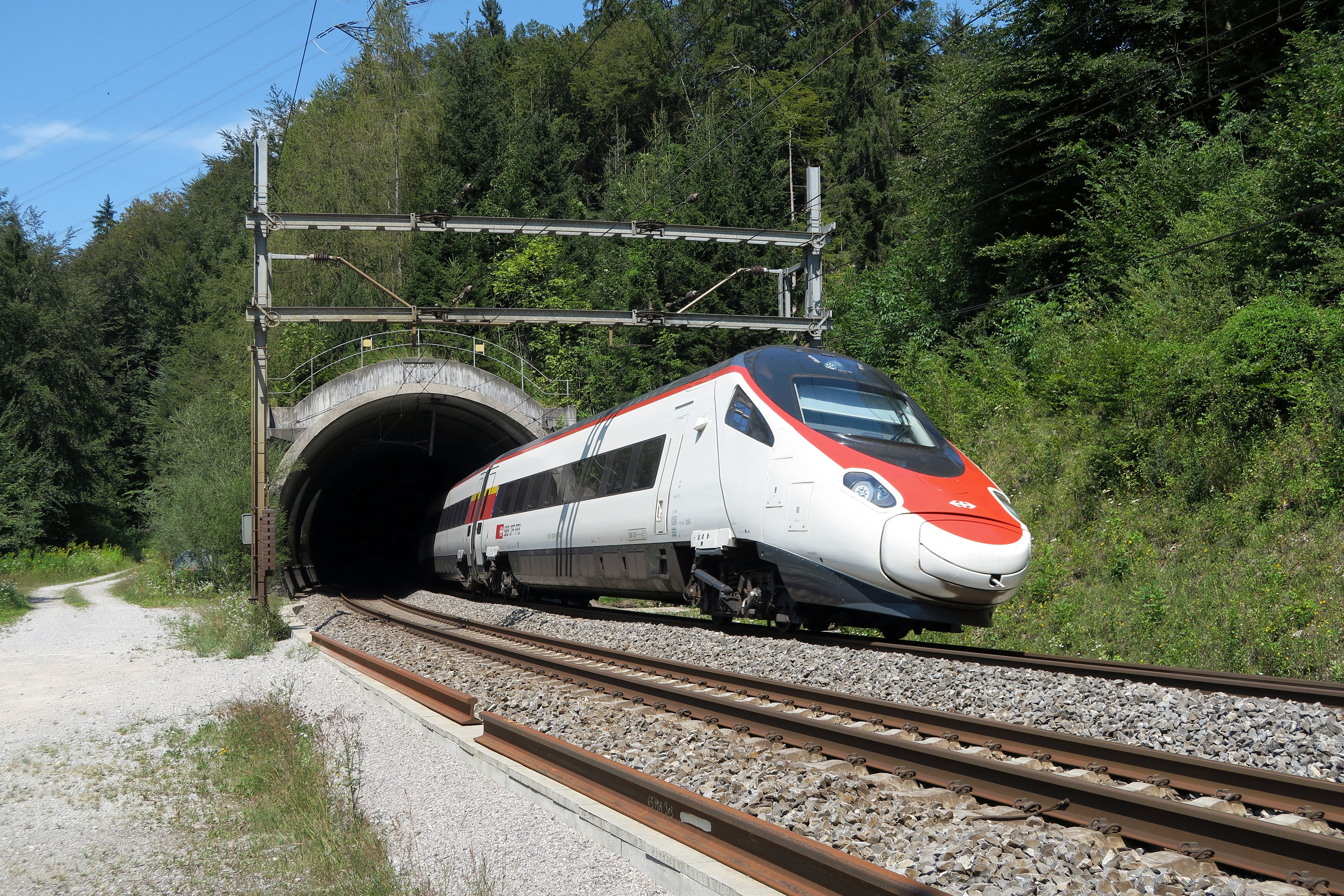
Hondrichtunnel in Spiez

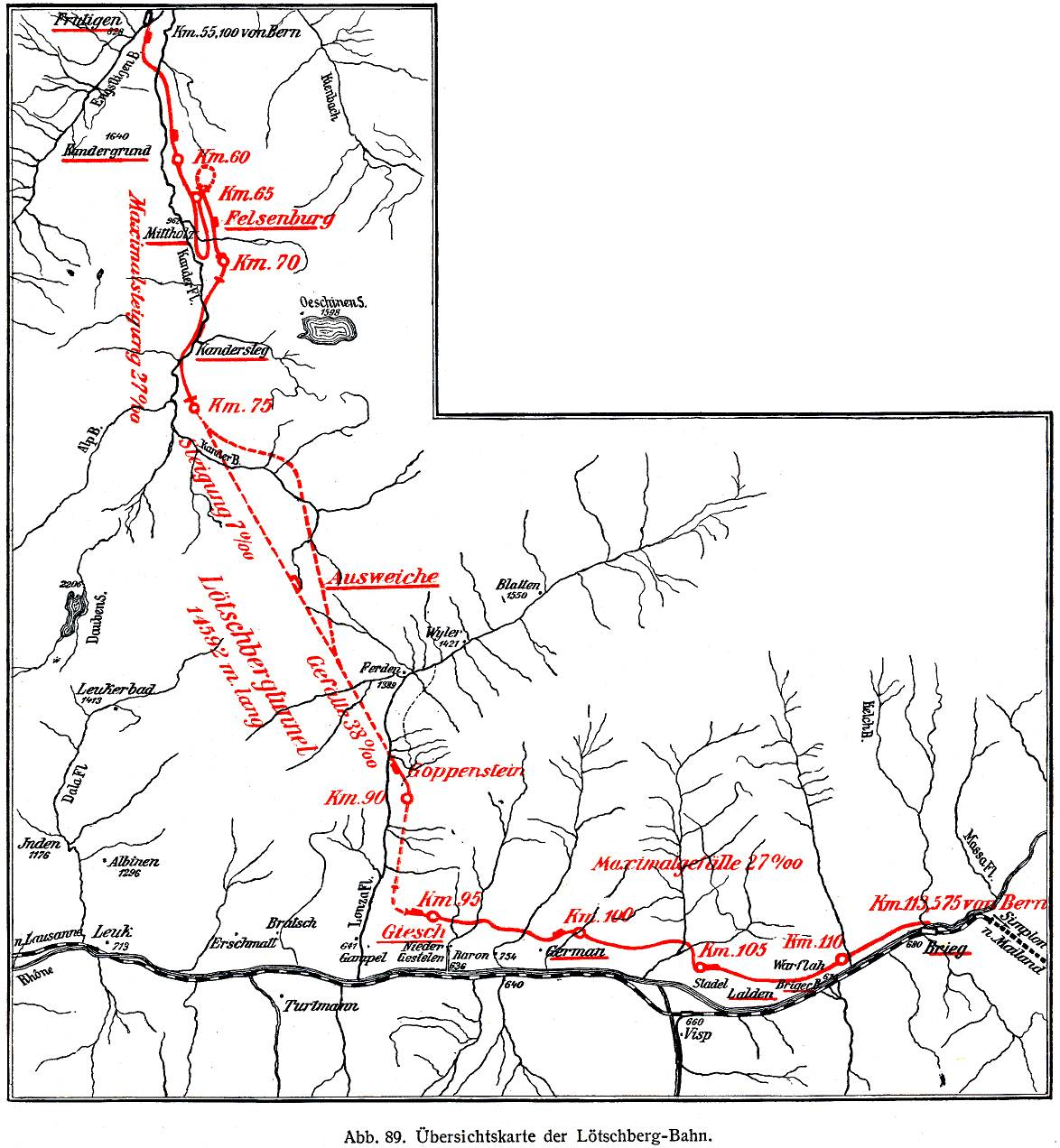
Outline of the Lötschberg line between Frutigen and Brig. From km 60 to 70 a narrow u-turn is followed by a spiral tunnel. The curved Lötschberg Tunnel is between km 75 to 90. Positions are given as travel distance from Bern in km.

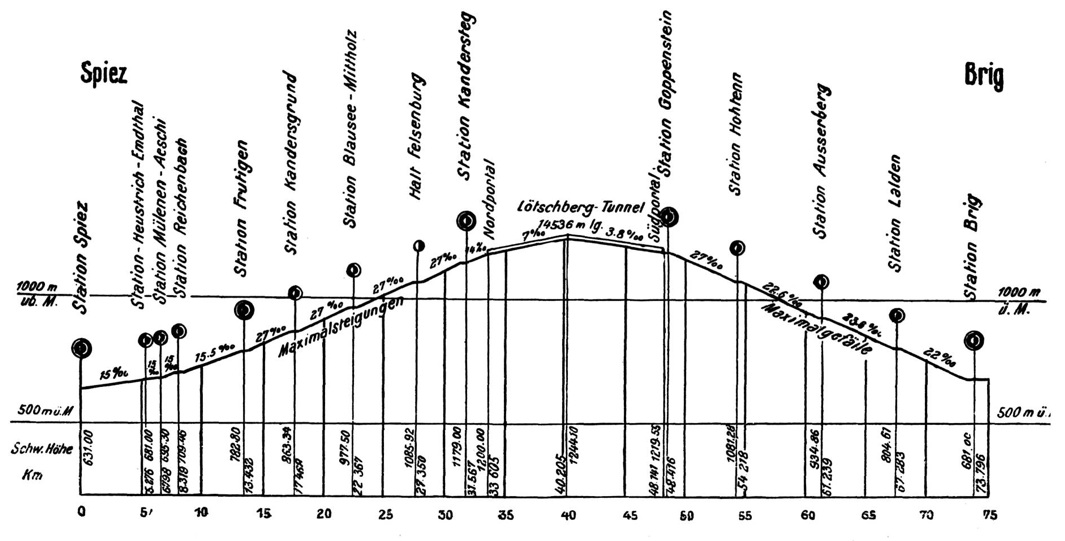
Profile of the Lötschberg line. For each segment between stations the maximum slope is noted.

== History ==
The railway from Bern to Münsingen and Thun was opened in 1859 by the Schweizerische Centralbahn ("Swiss Central Railway"). This company, including the Bern–Thun line, was taken over by the Swiss Federal Railways on its establishment in 1902, although most local passenger and freight services on it are now operated by the Bern-Lötschberg-Simplon railway (BLS). In 1893 the Thunerseebahn ("Lake Thun Railway") was opened between Thun, Spiez, Interlaken and Bönigen. It was absorbed by BLS in 1913.

Around 1890 the canton of Bern began to consider the possibility of building a railway to connect with the proposed Simplon Tunnel. It was entitled under the Swiss constitution to build its own railway through the Alps. However, it was unlikely to receive financial support from the Swiss Confederation because the Swiss government had provided significant funding for the Gotthard railway; therefore Bern would have to find funds from elsewhere to build its own line to the south.

In 1891 a small group of eminent persons obtained a concession for the construction of a railway line between Spiez and Frutigen with the option of later extending it into the Valais. A retired member of the cantonal government and judge, Wilhelm Teuscher studied route options and concluded that the current route was feasible. On 25 July 1901 the railway was opened from Spiez to Frutigen as the Spiez-Frutigen-Bahn (SFB) as the first stage of the Lötschberg line.

Meanwhile, a line from Lenk im Simmental under Wildstrubel to Leukerbad in the Valais was also proposed. However, the supporters of the Lötschberg were able to raise sufficient funds to allow the Lötschberg proposal to go forward. On 27 July 1906, the Berner Alpenbahngesellschaft Bern-Lötschberg-Simplon (BLS) was founded for the construction and operation of the proposed railway and on 1 January 1907, it absorbed the Spiez-Frutigen-Bahn.

=== Construction ===
The French consortium Entreprise du Lötschberg was awarded the contract for the entire Lötschberg line and construction commenced on 15 October 1906 with the drilling of the north portal of the Lötschberg tunnel.

It was originally intended that the line be built as a single track, but during construction a decision was taken to build the Lötschberg Tunnel with double track and to prepare the approaches for double track in the future. The track geometry of the approaches was redesigned to make possible a second track and buildings and tunnels made provision for a future second track. The maximum gradient was set at 27 per thousand (2.7%) and curves had a minimum radius of 300 m (980 ft). The builders established a 750 mm (2 ft 5 1/2 in) gauge railway on both approaches to the tunnel.

During the construction of the Lötschberg line, there were several fatal accidents. On the evening of 29 February 1908 the construction caused an avalanche which hit a hotel and killed 12 of its guests who were eating dinner. On 24 July 1908 a collapse of weak strata caused a sudden flood in the Lötschberg tunnel killing 25 people, all but three of the workers on the shift. This disaster forced a realignment of the tunnel route bypassing the area of weak strata.

Originally it was planned to open the line on 1 March 1912, but this date was twice delayed by the decision to build a double track line through the main tunnel and make provision for future double track on the rest of the line. On 15 July 1913 electrification of the line was completed and a limited service began. On 16 September 1913 a more complete schedule began with 16 trains, including four international express trains.

==== Completion of tunnels ====
The dates of the breakthroughs of the approach tunnels were as follows.

North side

- Riedschuk tunnel,
- Felsenburg tunnel II, 28 December 1910
- Ronenwaldtunnel I, 15 September 1910
- Ronenwald tunnel II, 30 September 1910
- Rotbach tunnel, 9 September 1910
- Hemligen tunnel, 10 November 1910

South side

- Rotlaui tunnel, 3 April 1908
- Mittalgraben tunnel, 29 March 1908
- Luegje tunnel, 5 April 1908
- Hohegg tunnel, 30 November 1907
- Marchgraben tunnel, 13 December 1907
- Hohtenn tunnel, 10 March 1908
- Lidenplatten tunnel, 30 September 1907
- Blasboden tunnel, 6 February 1908
- Sevistein tunnel I, 17 March 1908
- Mahnkinn tunnel, 29 March 1908
- Stadel tunnel, 11 March 1908
- Viktoria tunnel, 5 November 1907
- Mundbach tunnel, 28 September 1907
- Stadel tunnel, 25 November 1910
- Schluchi tunnel, 8 April 1911
- Bietschtal tunnel I, 29 August 1911
- Bietschtal tunnel II, 21 February 1911
- Sevistein tunnel II, 30 December 1911
- Gründenrunnel, 11 March 1911
- Eggerberg tunnel, 24 March 1911
- Bad tunnel, 31 March 1911
- Sevistein tunnel III, 25 October 1915 (replacement for Sevistein tunnel I and II, damaged by a landslide)

==== Construction railways ====
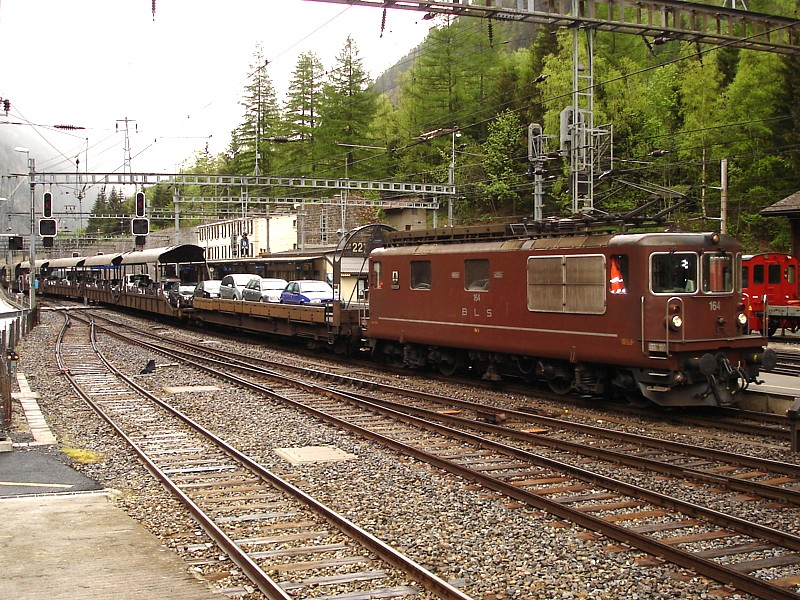
A BLS auto train led by a Re 4 4 over Lötschberg pass.

For the construction of the Lötschberg line and the main tunnel two special railways had to be constructed to bring material from Frutigen or the junction at Naters near Brig to the portals of the Lötschberg tunnel. The gauge of the railways was 750 mm (2 ft 5 1/2 in), the maximum gradient was 60 per thousand (6%) and the minimum curve radius was 50 m (160 ft). On the northern approach the construction line was built on a different route from the permanent line, while on the south side the construction line followed the permanent line to a large extent.

The rolling stock for the construction lines consisted of 420 waggons and 32 small steam locomotives with Klien-Lindner axles, delivered from June to November 1907 by the German firm of Orenstein & Koppel. The trains reached a top speed of 15 km/h (9.3 mph) and their transport capacity amounted to an average of 13,000 t (12,795 long tons; 14,330 short tons) per month.

===== Northern approach =====
The engineer J. Seeberger was responsible for building a construction railway between Frutigen and the tunnel portal near Kandersteg; it was over 15 km (9.3 mi) long and climbed about 429 m (1,407 ft) in altitude. The earthworks and structures of the construction railway were completed on 30 June 1907 and on 19 August the first steam locomotive ran to the portal of the tunnel. The construction railway had numerous junctions to lines connecting to the various construction sites for the main railway. Several wooden viaducts had to be built to climb from Blausee to Kandersteg. The most impressive was the Aegerten viaduct which was 126 m (413 ft) long and had a gradient of 57 per thousand (5.7%) and a curve radius of 50 m (164 ft).

===== Southern approach =====
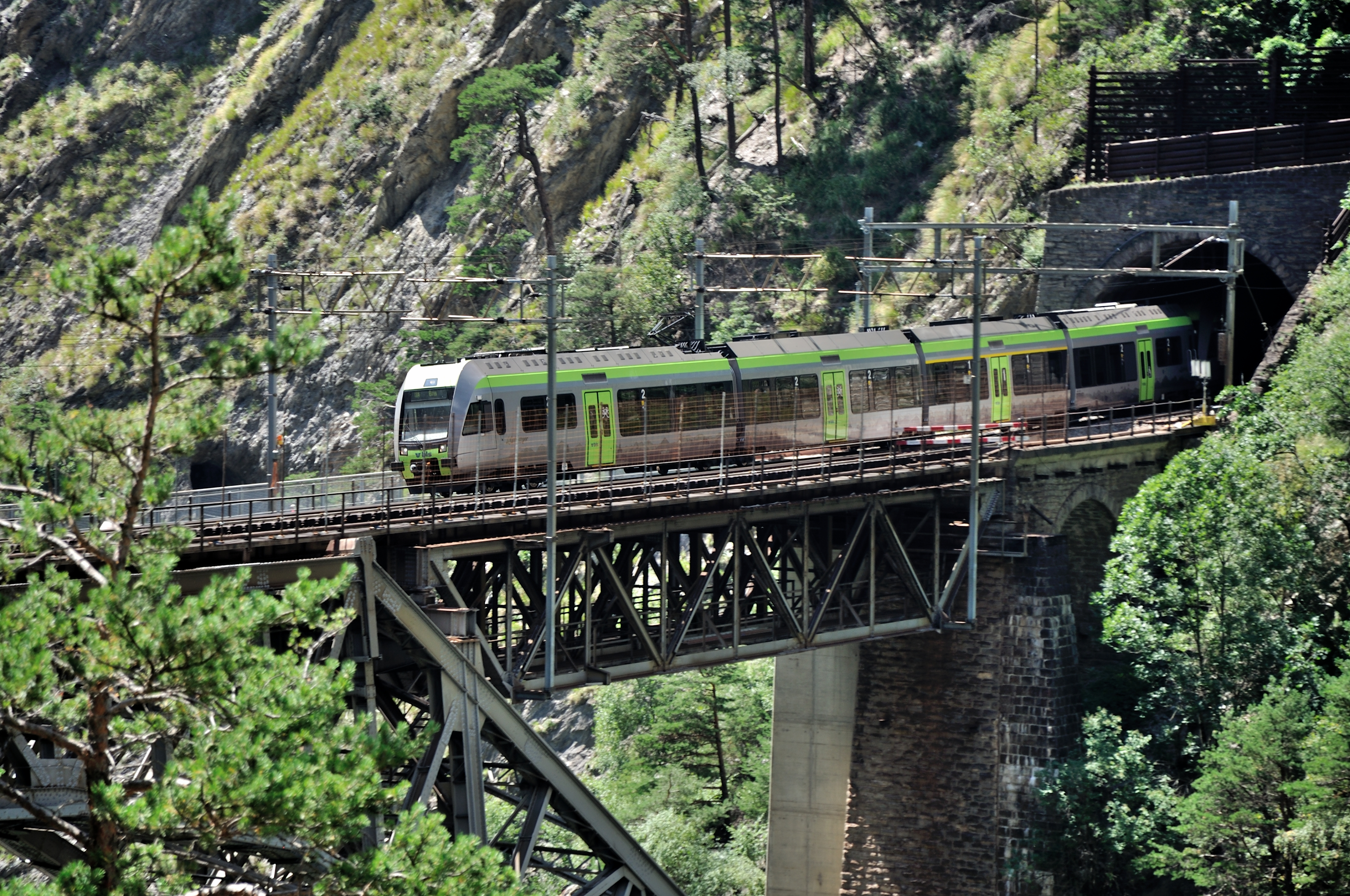
BLS regional express on the southern approach

The building of the construction railway on the south side was delayed by many appeals and the groundbreaking ceremony near Naters took place on 12 February 1907. The line of the 28 km (17.4 mi) long construction railway, with an average gradient of 30 per thousand (3%) corresponded almost exactly to the alignment of the permanent railway line as built except that the deviations around many side valleys and spurs were bypassed by the actual line. Even so, the construction line had 34 tunnels with a total length of 5.3 km (3.3 mi), of which 13 tunnels were enlarged to become part of the permanent line.

Finally, in August 1908, almost two years after beginning of tunnelling of the south portal of the tunnel, the first supply train ran all the way from Naters to the portal at Goppenstein. Previously all the building supplies had to be laboriously hauled up by mule or by cart through the narrow Lonza gorge.

The footpath along the southern approach to the Lötschberg Tunnel in some sections follows the route of the construction railway, particularly in the Bietsch and Baltschieder valleys.

=== Expansion of capacity ===
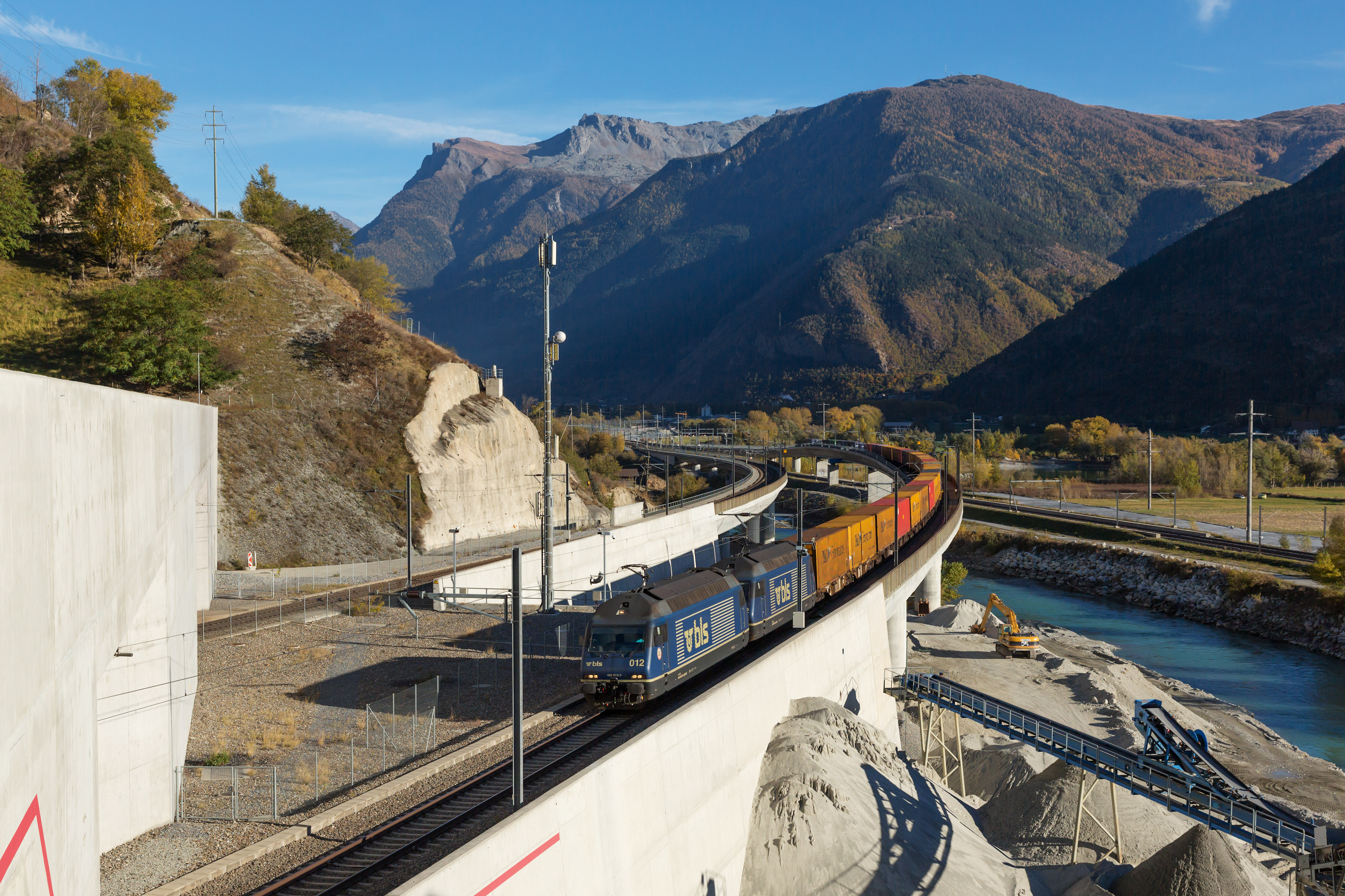
BLS Re 460s enter the south portal of the Lötschberg Base Tunnel.

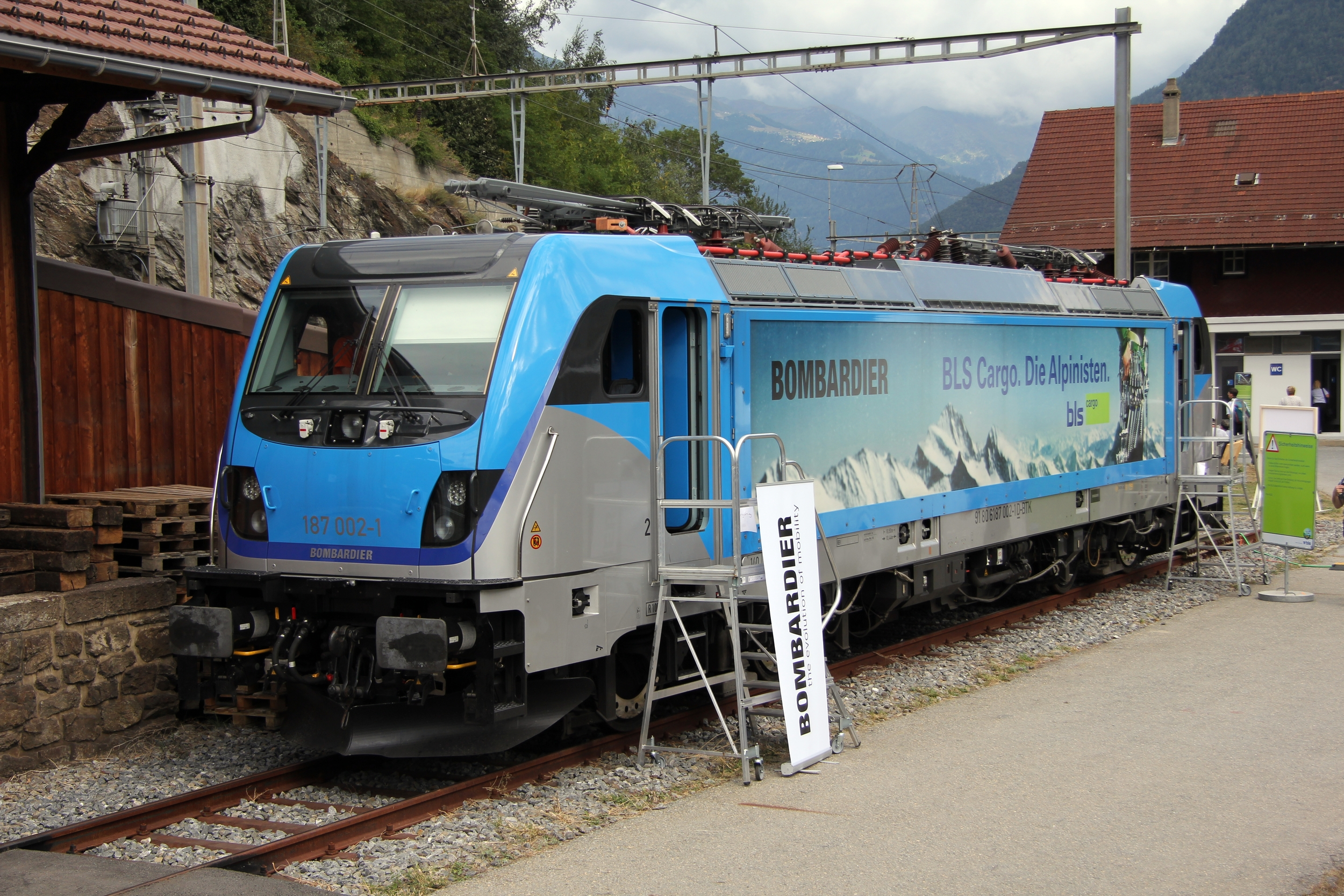
A BLS TRAXX 187 celebrating the Lötschberg railway.

The approaches to the Lötschberg tunnel were originally single track and subsequently doubled. The bridges and tunnels of the line were partly designed to be doubled, but were initially not fully bored or built. Double tracking of the line was completed between 1976 and 1992. At the same time the tracks were lowered to create a continuous SIM corridor (Simplon Inter-Modal) for a rolling highway (trucks carried on flatcars) and high-cube containers. Also, the passenger train capacity was greatly increased.

In mid 2007, the Lötschberg Base Tunnel was completed between Frutigen and Visp. This was the first of two new lines through the Swiss Alps as part of NRLA. As a result, the old Lötschberg line between Frutigen and Brig is used much less intensively than previously.

=== Current operations on the mountain line ===
The new base tunnel has taken almost all the long-distance passenger and a considerable part of the freight from the original Lötschberg tunnel, but was immediately saturated because a single track section reduces its capacity. Some freight trains and hourly regional express trains between Bern and Spiez run on the mountain railway. In addition, the car ferry continues to operate between Kandersteg and Goppenstein; it is subsidized by the Swiss government to substitute for a road tunnel under the Rawil Pass that was planned in the 1970s but never built.

== Data ==
- Gauge: 1,435 mm (4 ft 8 1/2 in)
- Current: 15,000 V AC 16.67 Hz
- Length: 74 km (46 mi)
- Maximum gradient: 27 ‰ (2.7%)
- Height at northern end (Spiez): 630 m (2,067 ft) above sea level
- Height at southern end (Brig): 678 m (2,224 ft) above sea level
- Apex of the line in the Lötschberg tunnel: 1,240 m (4,068 ft) above sea level
- Opening the line Spiez-Frutigen by the Spiez-Frutigen-Bahn: 25 July 1901
- Start of construction of the line between Brig and Frutigen: 15 October 1906
- Takeover of the Spiez-Frutigen-Bahn by the BLS: 1 January 1907
- Breakthrough of the Lötschberg tunnel: 31 March 1911
- Opening of line: 15 July 1913

== See also ==
- NRLA and the Gotthard railway, Switzerland's other major Alpine freight corridor.
- Lötschberg Base Tunnel
- The Lötschberger or BLS RABe 535
- BLS AG

== Literature ==
- Hartung, Karlheinz (1989). Bahn und Reisen Schweiz (in German). R. v. Decker's Verlag. ISBN 3-7685-1289-4.
- Belloncle, Patrick (1986). Die Geschichte der Lötschbergbahn (in German). Les Éditions du Cabri, 1986. ISBN 2-903310-49-1.
- Jeanmaire, Claude (1989). Lötschbergbahn im Bau (in German). Verlag Eisenbahn. ISBN 3-85649-058-2.
