= Camedo railway station =

Railway station in Switzerland

Camedo
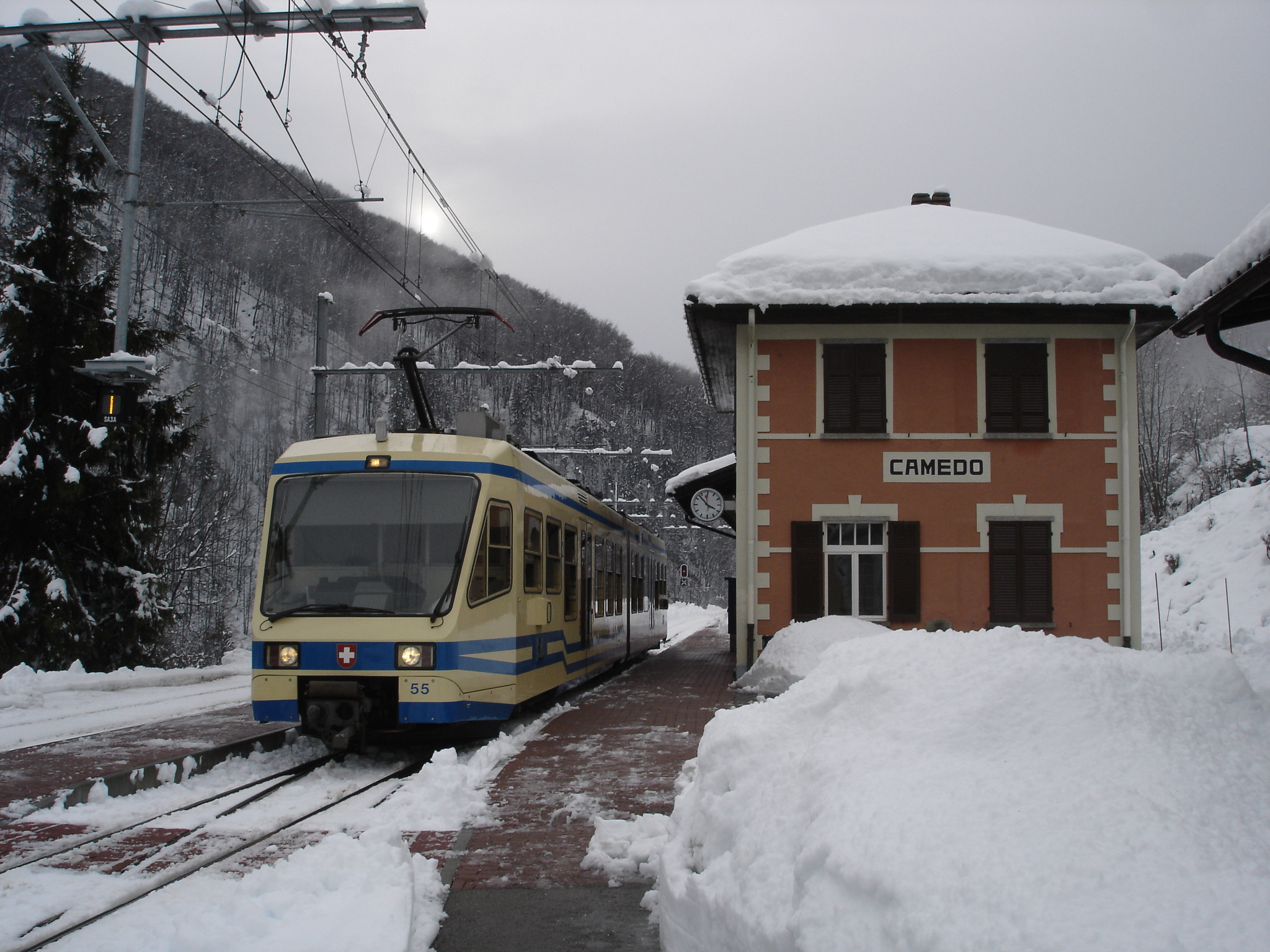
- A FART train at the station in 2009

General information
- Location: Centovalli, Ticino; Switzerland
- Coordinates: 46°09′18″N 8°36′40″E
- Elevation: 549 m (1,801 ft)
- Owner: Regional Bus and Rail Company of Ticino
- Line: Domodossola–Locarno line
- Distance: 13.1 km (8.1 mi) from Ponte Brolla
- Platforms: 1 island platform; 1 side platform
- Tracks: 2
- Train operators: Regional Bus and Rail Company of Ticino

Other information
- Fare zone: 310 (arcobaleno)

Services
Preceding station	FART	Following station
Re towards Domodossola	Panorama Express	Intragna towards Locarno FART
Terminus	Regio	Palagnedra towards Locarno FART
Location

Camedo railway station (Italian: Stazione di Camedo) is a railway station in the lower part of the village of Camedo, Switzerland. It is located on the 1,000 mm (3 ft 3 3/8 in) metre gauge Domodossola–Locarno line of the Regional Bus and Rail Company of Ticino (FART).

On the basis of a convention between Switzerland and Italy, the station carries out customs operations concerning the transportation of goods and livestock. To allow for checks on passengers, another agreement requires a room inside the station to be made available to the Italian authorities.
