= Locarno-Ponte Brolla-Bignasco railway =

Swiss railway line

Locarno-Ponte Brolla-Bignasco Valmaggina
- Operator: FART

Technical
- Track gauge: 1000 mm
- Electrification: 1200 V DC
- Length: 27.389

The Locarno-Ponte Brolla-Bignasco railway (LPB), also known as Valmaggina, was a narrow-gauge railway that connected the center of Locarno and Lake Maggiore with Bignasco, through the Vallemaggia. The starting station was Locarno Sant'Antonio.

== History ==
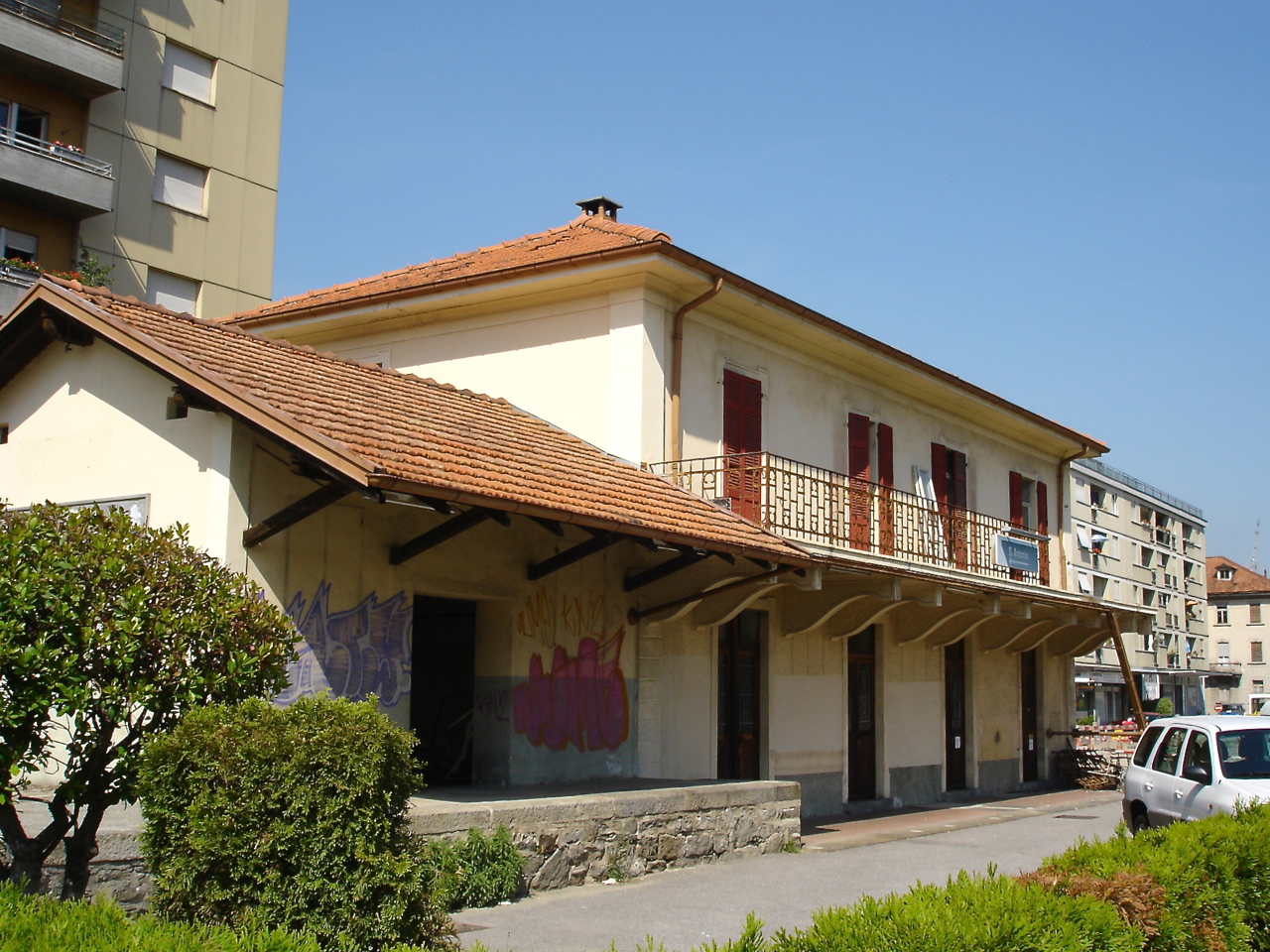
The Locarno Sant'Antonio station was used from 1907 to 1990. The station was inaugurated in 1907 exclusively for the Locarno-Ponte Brolla-Bignasco line until 1923, following the opening of the Centovallina. From 1923 to 1965, the station was shared by both lines until the closure of the Locarno-Ponte Brolla-Bignasco line, after which, from 1965, the station served only the Centovallina. With the construction of the tunnel in 1988 from Locarno to San Martino, the station remained in service until 1990 and was demolished in 2004. A parking lot was built in its place.

The first public transport service for passengers in Valle Maggia dates back to 1835, when the Canton of Ticino contracted “a proper postal service that included three weekly trips, two of which were to be made with a passenger vehicle”... With the Confederation taking over the postal service monopoly in 1848, it was progressively expanded to the point that “in 1869 [...] there was a double daily trip covering the Locarno-Bignasco route, later increased to three in 1884 and four in 1903”. In 1849, the travel time from Locarno to Bignasco was three and a half hours. Locarno (actually Muralto, part of the municipality of Orselina until 1881) was reached by the railway, coming from Bellinzona, on December 20, 1874; however, hopes of seeing it served by international trains were dashed a few years later when, with the opening of the Gotthard Railway, international connections were provided via Monte Ceneri and Chiasso or through the Cadenazzo–Luino railway along the left bank of Lake Verbano.

Since the early 1890s, there were projects to connect the more remote areas of the Canton to the new international railways. After an initial project presented in 1891 by the jurist, politician, and publisher Agostino Soldati and a cantonal law on the financing of regional railways (rejected by the public), the initiative in the Locarno area was taken by the then mayor of Locarno and National Councillor conservative Francesco Balli, who established the Pro Locarno e Dintorni in 1892 to promote the emerging tourism industry. In 1898, Balli requested and obtained the concession for three railway connections from Locarno: one to Bignasco, in Valle Maggia, one to Camedo/Ribellasca, through the Centovalli, and, as an alternative to the latter, one that would run along Lake Maggiore, passing through Ascona and Brissago to reach the border at Piaggio Valmara. On December 22, 1898, the concession for the construction of the three railway lines was granted with the condition that, for the two international connections, they should continue, with Italian approval, beyond the border to end at Domodossola (in the case of the Centovallina) and Intra (in the case of the line along Lake Maggiore).

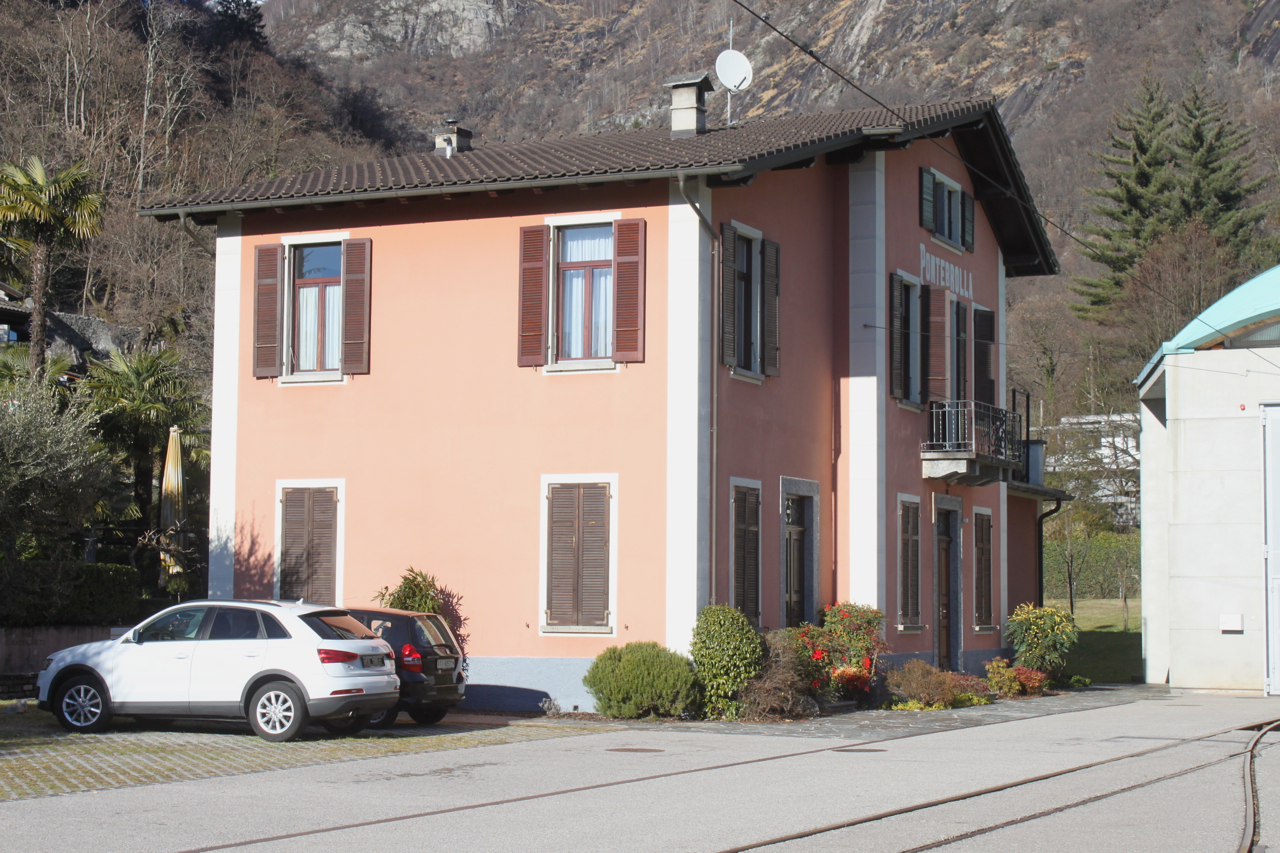
The LPB Ponte Brolla station, in service from 1907 to 1923, when passenger service was transferred to the new station shared with the Centovallina, located before the branch to Camedo.

On July 12, 1903, the Società per la Ferrovia Locarno-Pontebrolla-Bignasco was founded (LPB; in 1941, it changed its corporate name to Ferrovia Locarno-Pontebrolla-Bignasco). In 1905, after securing funding of 2.28 million francs through government funds, construction of the railway began. The line was inaugurated on August 3, 1907, between Locarno Sant'Antonio and Bignasco, although it entered service on September 2, 1907. About a year later, thanks to the opening of a Locarno tramway line, the line was extended to the Locarno station of the Gotthardbahn (now SBB). Before the railway’s construction, on November 13, 1904, the Ponte Brolla hydroelectric power plant of the Società Elettrica Sopracenerina was completed with a voltage generator for producing alternating current for the railway company.

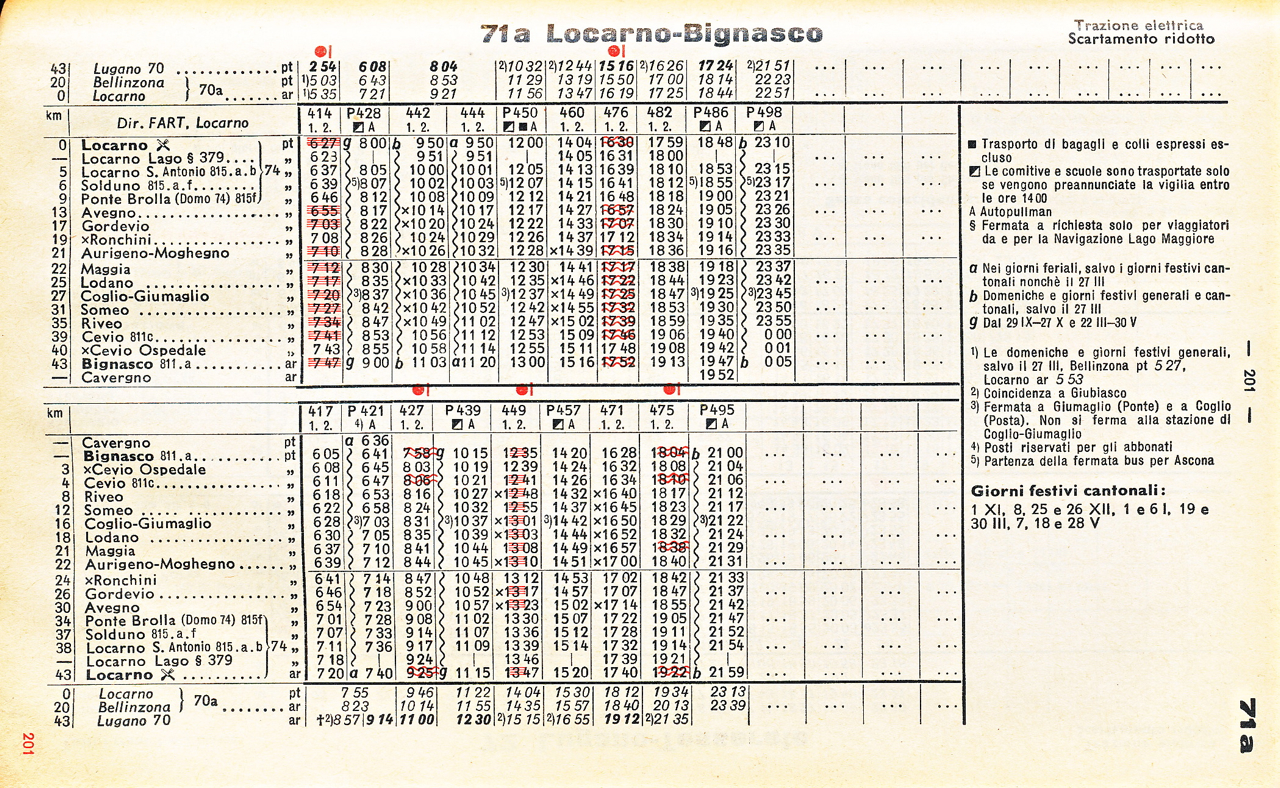
1963/1964 timetable; note the numerous additional bus services due to the maintenance of the railcars.

From 1923, the line’s operation was entrusted to the “Società per le Ferrovie Regionali Ticinesi” (FRT), which also operated the already built Centovallina railway. In 1952, the LPB was absorbed by the FRT, and before the 1960s, the FRT also provided bus services in the Locarno area: on June 30, 1961, the company took the name Ferrovie Autolinee Regionali Ticinesi (FART)

== Remains ==
Few traces remain of the old line. In some areas, the tracks were removed to make way for the cantonal road or converted into cycle paths.

- The stations Avegno railway station, Gordevio railway station, Aurigeno-Moghegno railway station, Maggia railway station, Coglio-Giumaglio railway station, Someo railway station, Cevio railway station, and Bignasco railway station were demolished to make way for the cantonal road or bus stops.
- The surviving stations are Ronchini railway station, Lodano railway station, and Riveo railway station.
- Of the four tunnels on the line, three remain: the 58 m Ponte Brolla tunnel (walled up on the Bignasco side) is located behind the FART depot-workshop. The small Avegno tunnel was demolished to make way for the cantonal road. The 180 m Sass Pietsch tunnel was widened in 2001 for the cantonal road. The small Visletto tunnel is still visible from the cantonal road.
- The bridges over the Maggia River still exist: the Ponte Brolla bridge (rebuilt in 1951) and the Visletto bridge, which were not removed after the line’s closure in 1965, are still clearly visible from the cantonal road. The Ponte Brolla and Visletto bridges were converted into cycle paths in 2016 and 2022, respectively.
- In Bignasco, the locomotive shed was demolished in 1970, and a bus depot, inaugurated in the same year, was built on the site.

== Characteristics ==
The line was entirely narrow-gauge and electrified with direct current at 1,200 V. From its opening and operation in 1907 until 1923, the line was operated with single-phase alternating current at 5,000 V and a frequency of 20 Hz (the voltage was reduced to 800 V on the tramway section). The electricity was supplied by the hydroelectric power plant of the Società Elettrica Locarnese (later Società Elettrica Sopracenerina) located in Ponte Brolla.

The contact line was of the lateral type (system MFO), later modified to the central type concurrently with the commissioning of the Centovallina; the tramway section always used the latter contact line system.

The route was entirely on natural adhesion.

The first section, between Locarno and Ponte Brolla, was shared with the Domodossola–Locarno railway line. Previously, from 1908 to 1927, the section from Locarno Sant'Antonio to Locarno SBB was shared with the tramway.; this section was used until 1964 in case of high water

The line served both passenger traffic and freight transport, particularly the transport of granite from the quarry in Riveo.

== Rolling stock ==
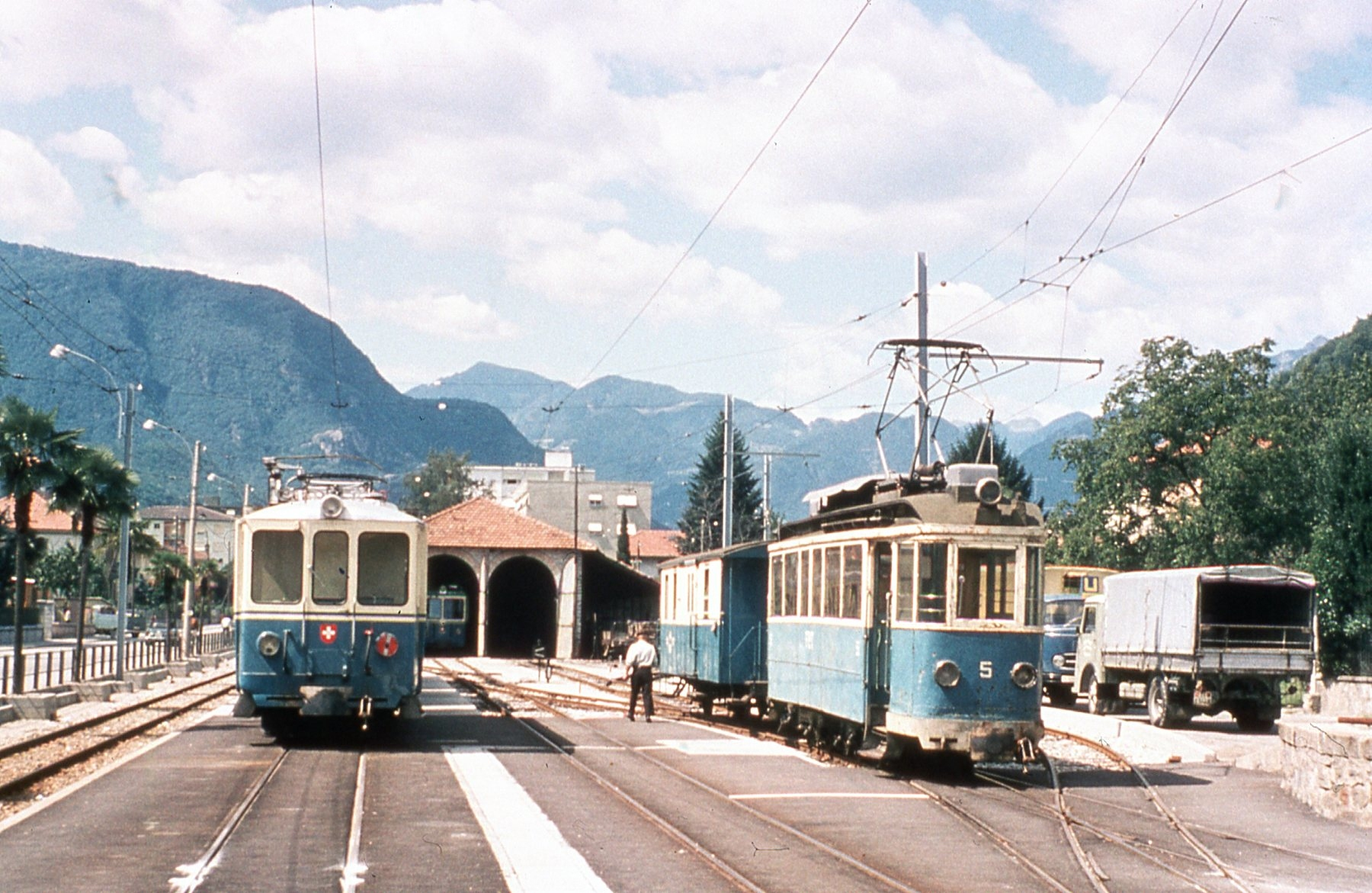
Locarno S. Antonio station, with the ABDe 4/4 1 visible on the left.

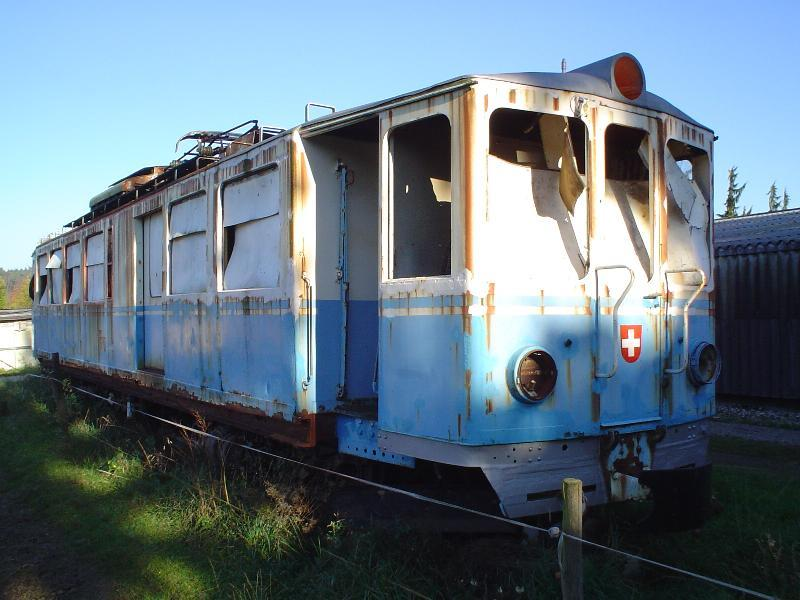
The ABDe 4/4 1, the last railcar of the Vallemaggia. Until 1961, it was identical to the ABDe 4/4 2 and ABDe 4/4 3, which were demolished in 1967 and 1966, respectively, while the ABDe 4/4 1 operated until 1980 on the Centovallina, then was withdrawn from service and left abandoned. It was demolished on February 26, 2010.

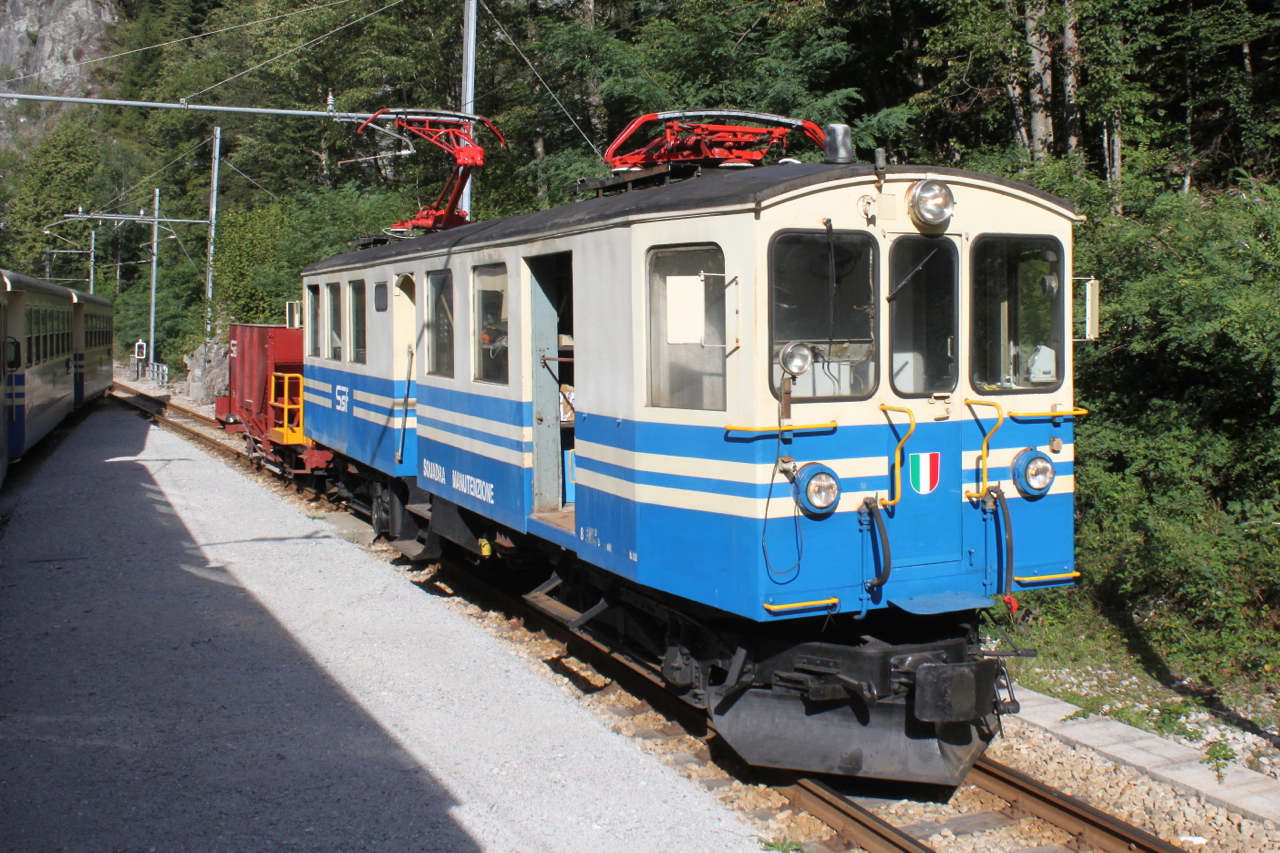
The ABDe 4/4 18, used from 1945 to 1965, was transferred to the Centovallina after the closure. In August 1967, it collided with the ABe 8/8 22 and was left as scrap for six years, but in 1972, it was rebuilt. Since then, it has been used as a service vehicle. It is the only Vallemaggia railcar still in existence.

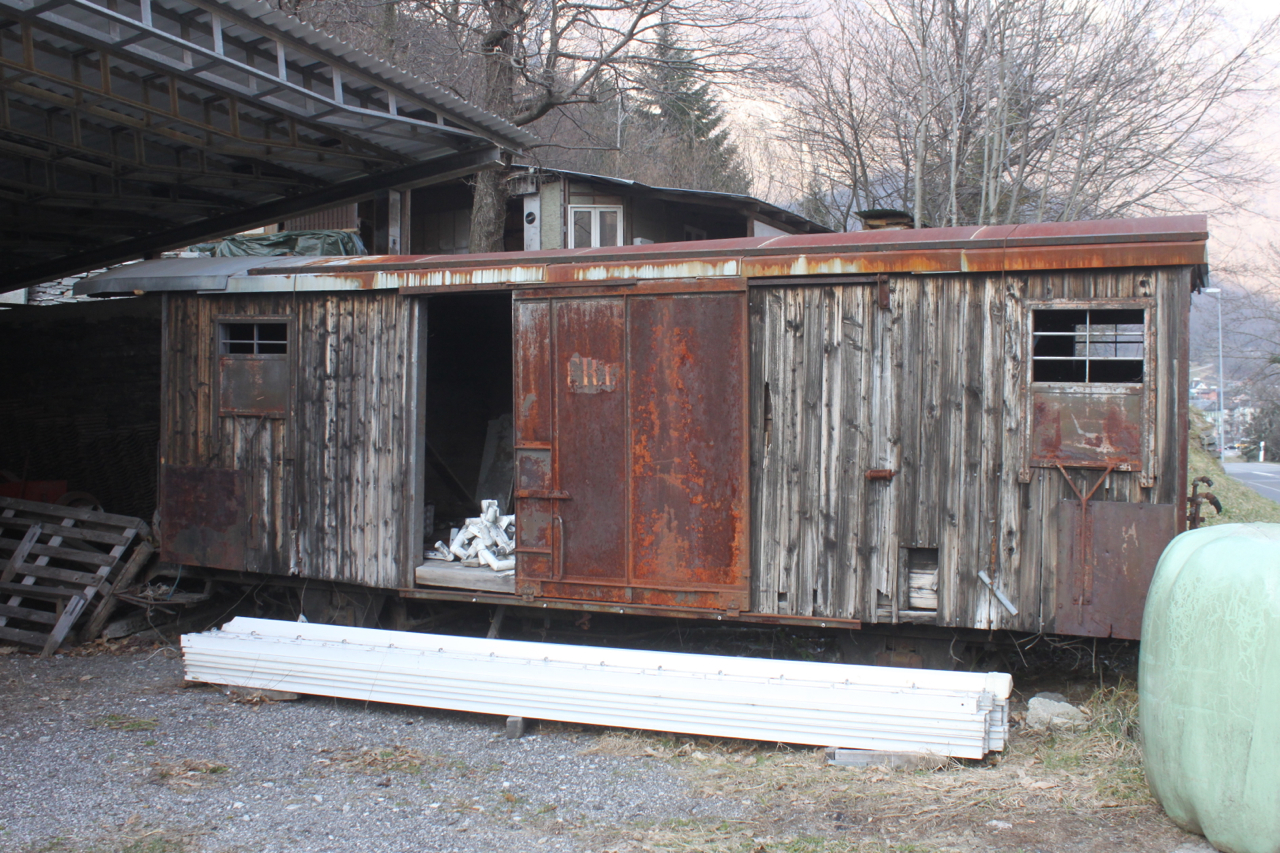
The K 105 wagon left in Bignasco after the line’s closure.

The original rolling stock of the LPB consisted of three BCFe 4/4 railcars manufactured by MAN and MFO, numbered 1-3. They offered 12 second-class seats and 32 third-class seats, plus a 5.4 m² baggage compartment with a 3-ton capacity; they reached a maximum speed of 45 km/h. The ABDe 4/4 (as it was later renamed) underwent modernization in 1964, significantly altering its external appearance

In 1911, a two-axle freight locomotive, classified as Ge 2/2 4, manufactured by SWS and MFO, joined the LPB fleet. This locomotive was lost on May 31, 1923, when a military truck collided with the train at Visletto, causing it to derail and fall into the swollen river (four railway workers perished in the accident)

Various motor vehicles also occasionally operated in Vallemaggia: during the conversion of the electrical system, service was provided by the FRT’s G 3/4 7 and 8 steam locomotives; these also assisted after the flood in Someo on September 24, 1924, which severely damaged the contact line. In August 1945, to compensate for the unavailability of two railcars due to accidents, the BCFe 4/4 18 from the Centovalli railway was equipped with a pole to draw power between Ponte Brolla and Bignasco; this railcar returned to service in Vallemaggia from 1962 until the line’s closure. The same operation was carried out around 1952 with the Ce 2/2 1 railcar from the tramway, which was used for service runs from that point onward

Regarding passenger rolling stock, the LPB acquired two C^{2} 51-52 passenger cars manufactured by MAN for the line’s opening, offering 40 third-class seats. In 1912, a mixed passenger and postal car, CZ 71, manufactured by SWS, was added, with 16 third-class seats and a postal compartment with twenty folding seats

The LPB also acquired, in 1907, four closed wagons type K, eight open low-sided wagons type M, and two pairs of articulated wagons type N, all manufactured by Waggonfabrik Rastatt. In 1910, two additional low-sided wagons type M, manufactured by SWS and owned by the Società delle Cave di Pietre di Vallemaggia based in Cevio, were added

Wagon and carriage exchanges were easily facilitated, as the rolling stock on the lines connected to the LPB had minor incompatibilities.

== Route ==
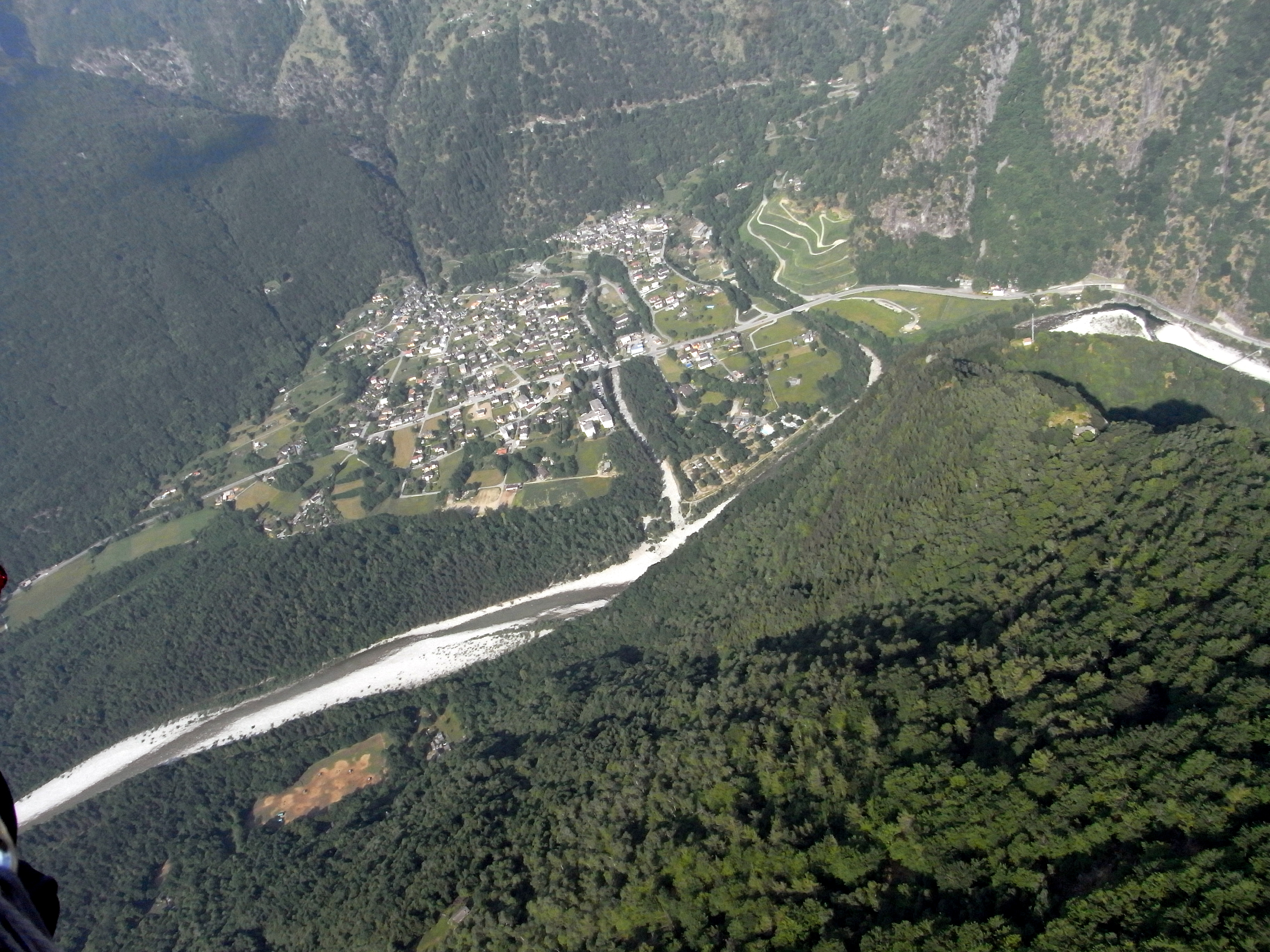
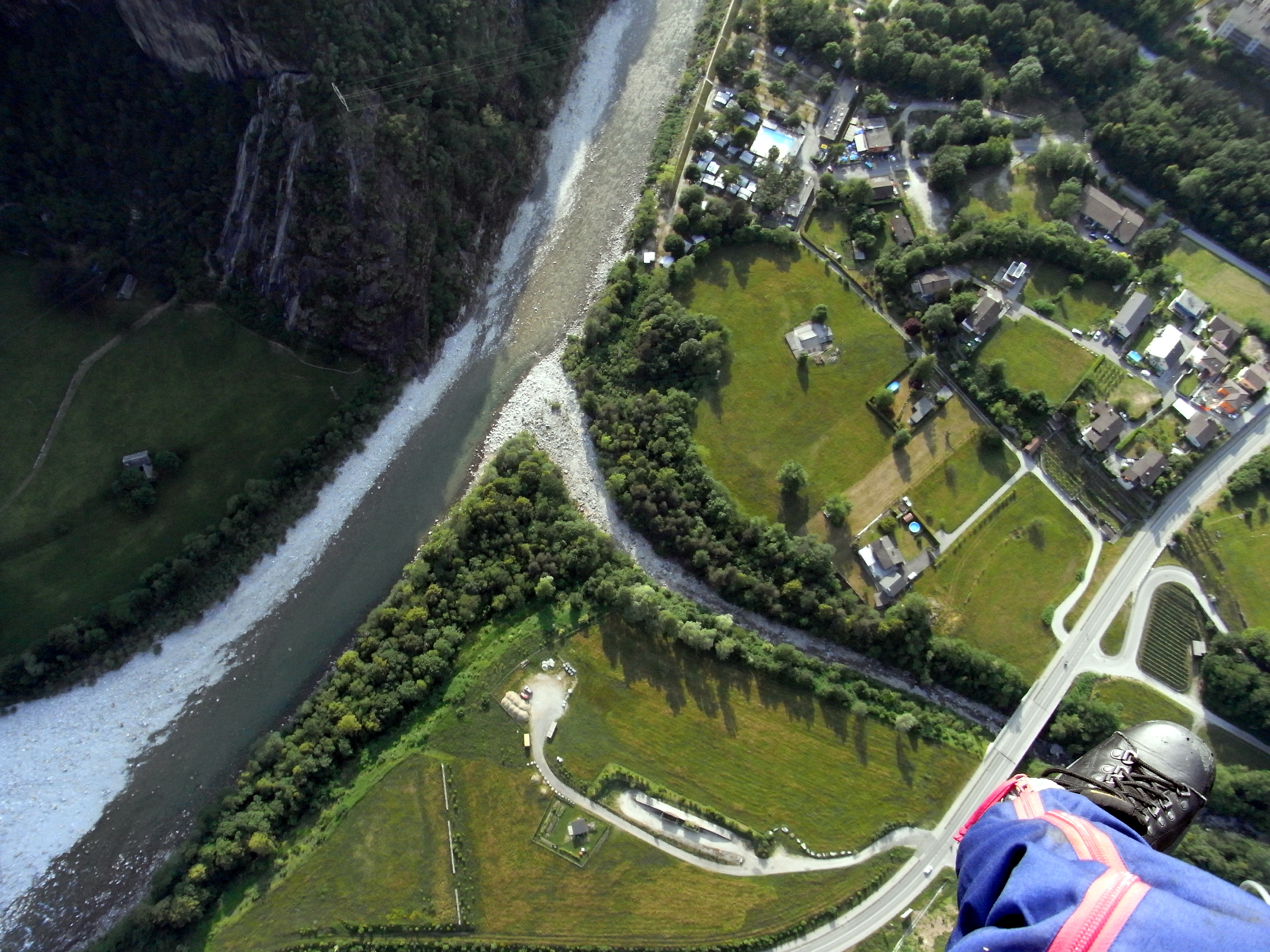
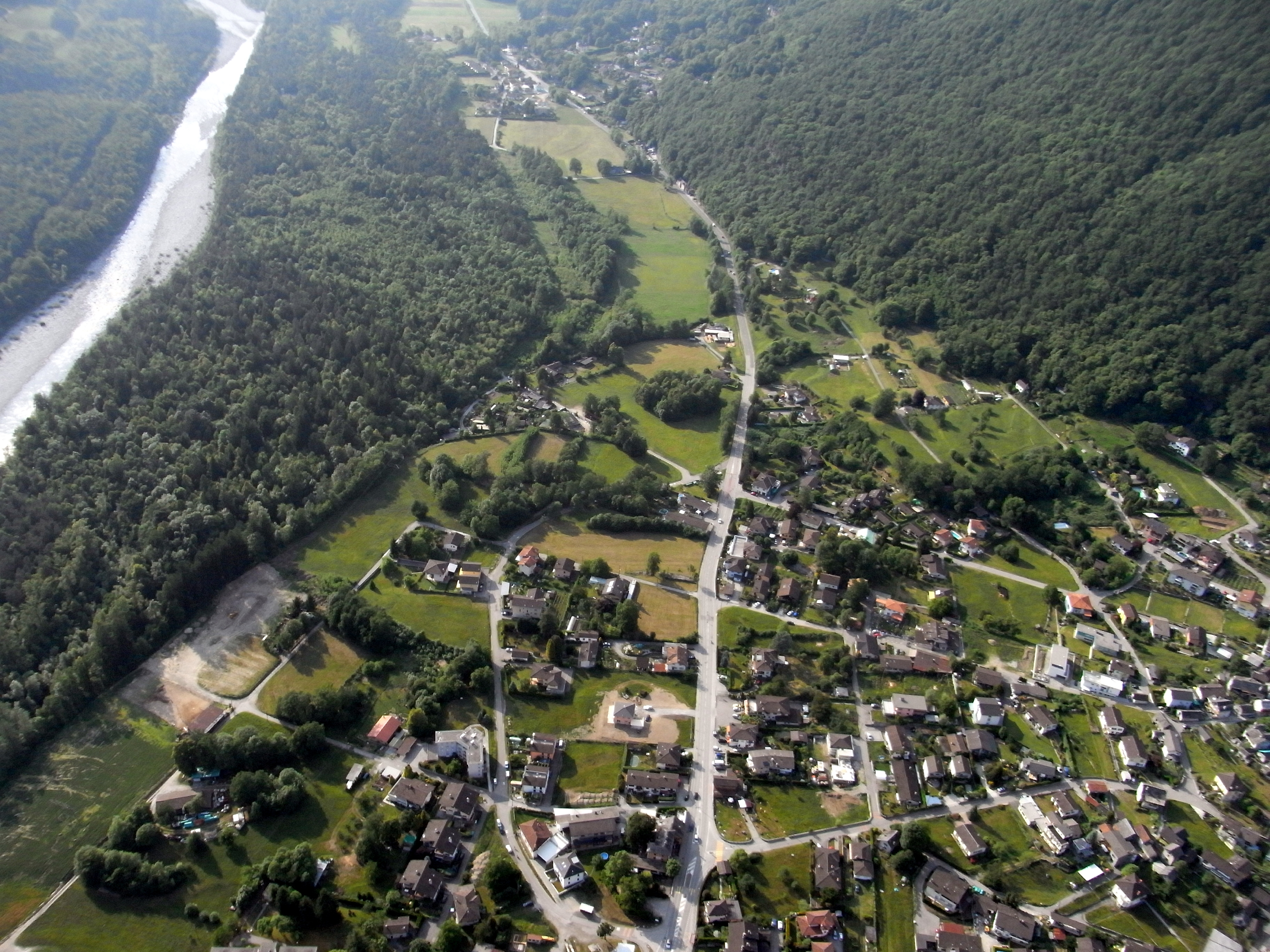
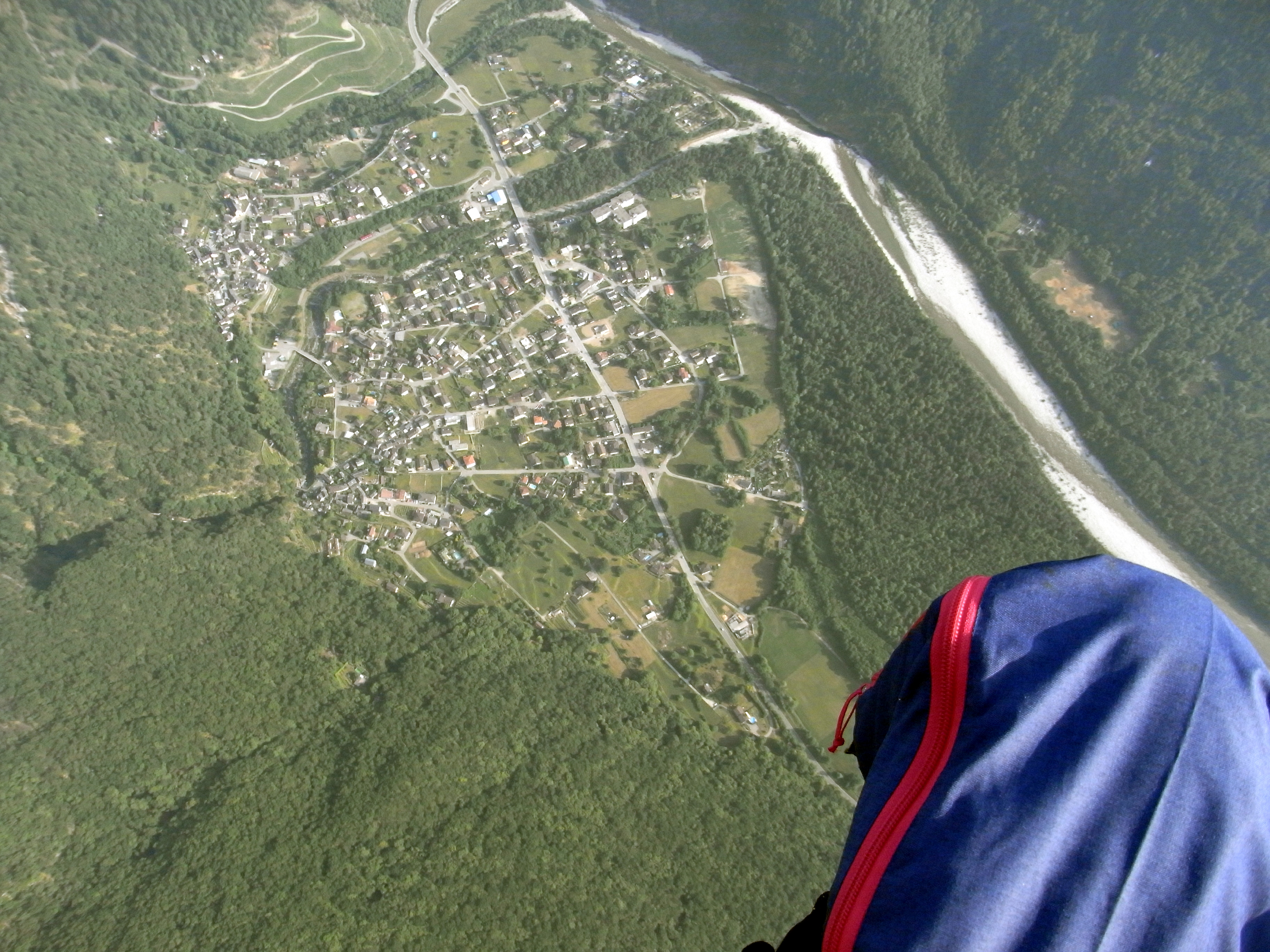
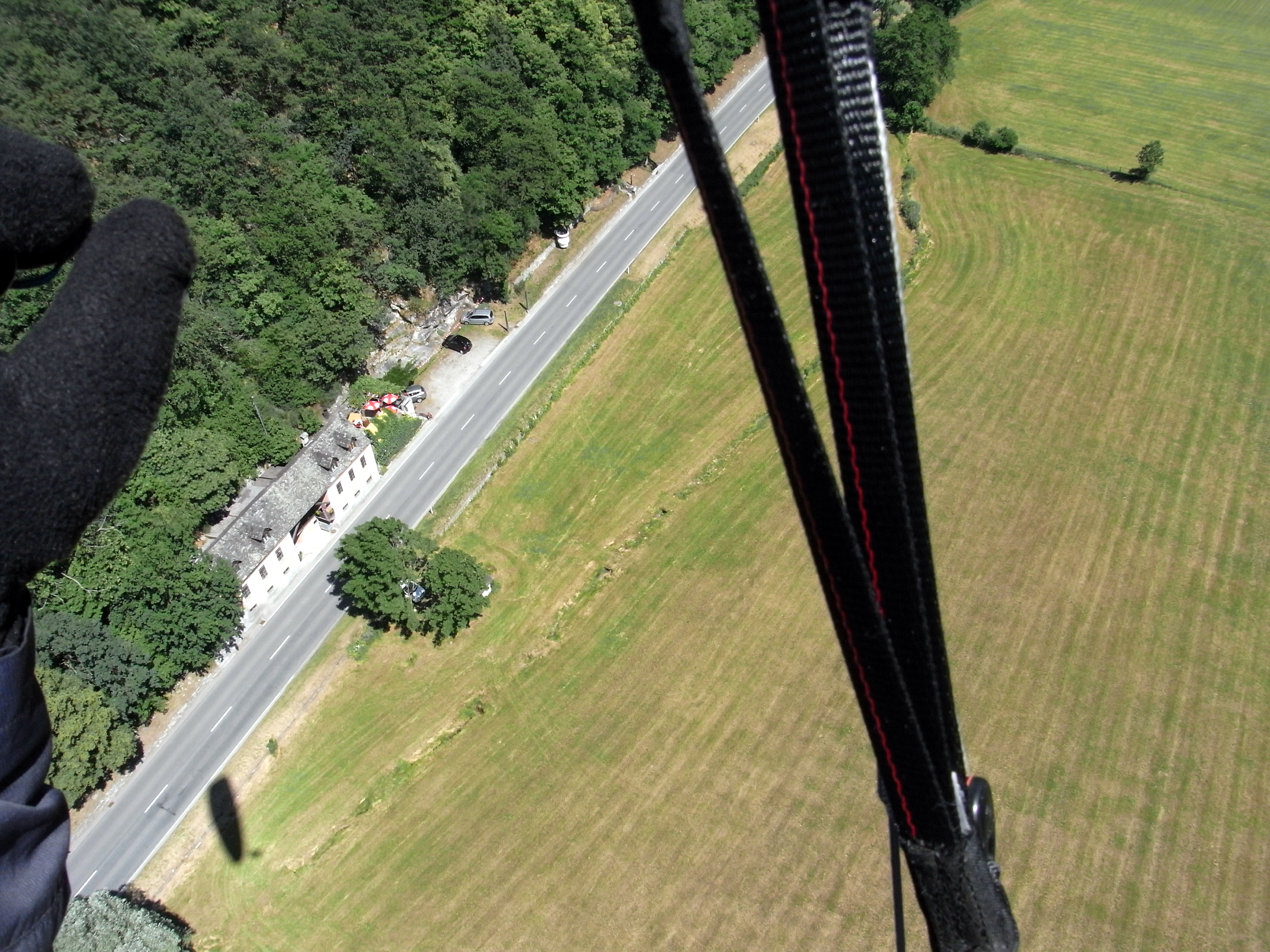
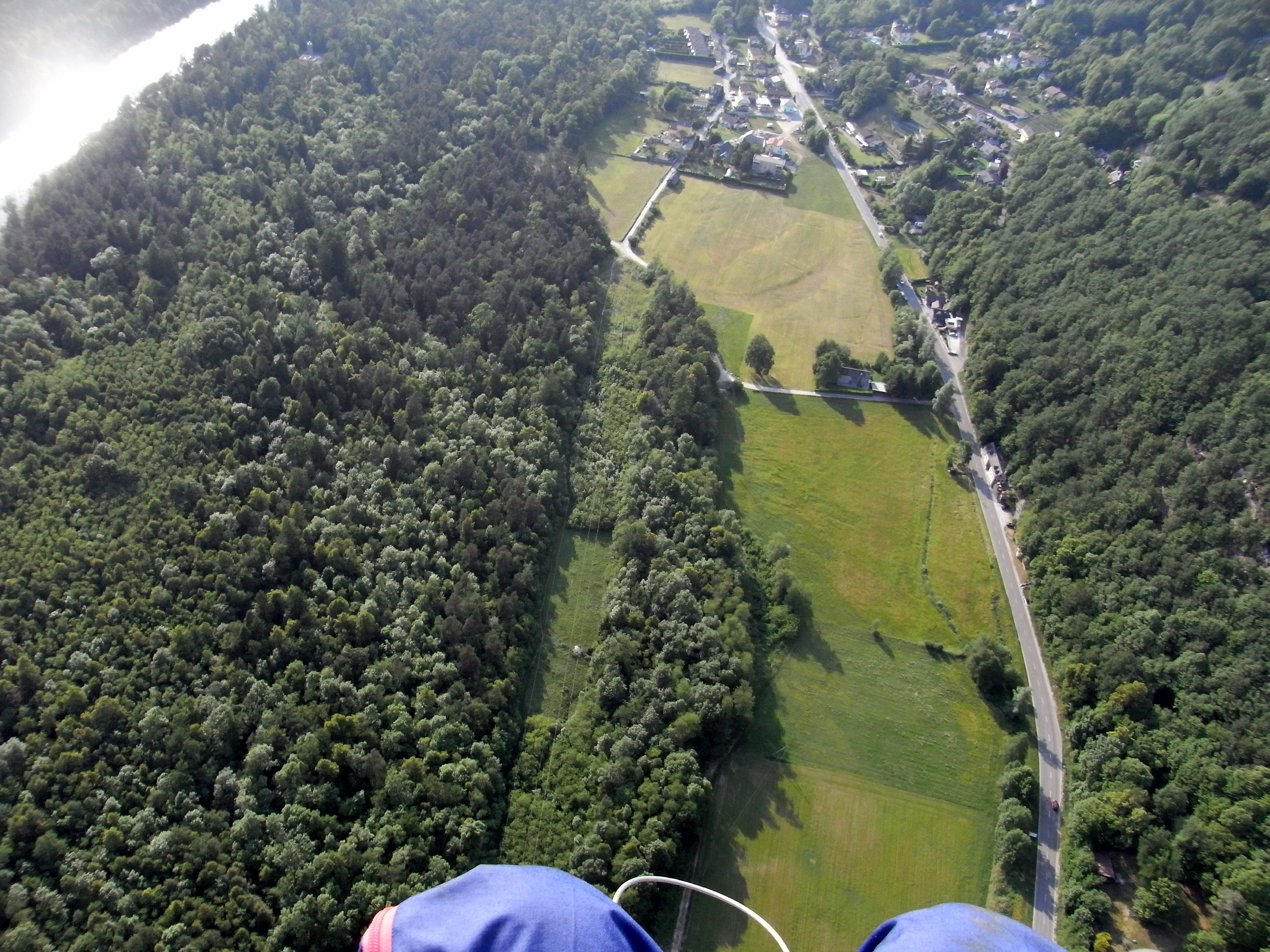
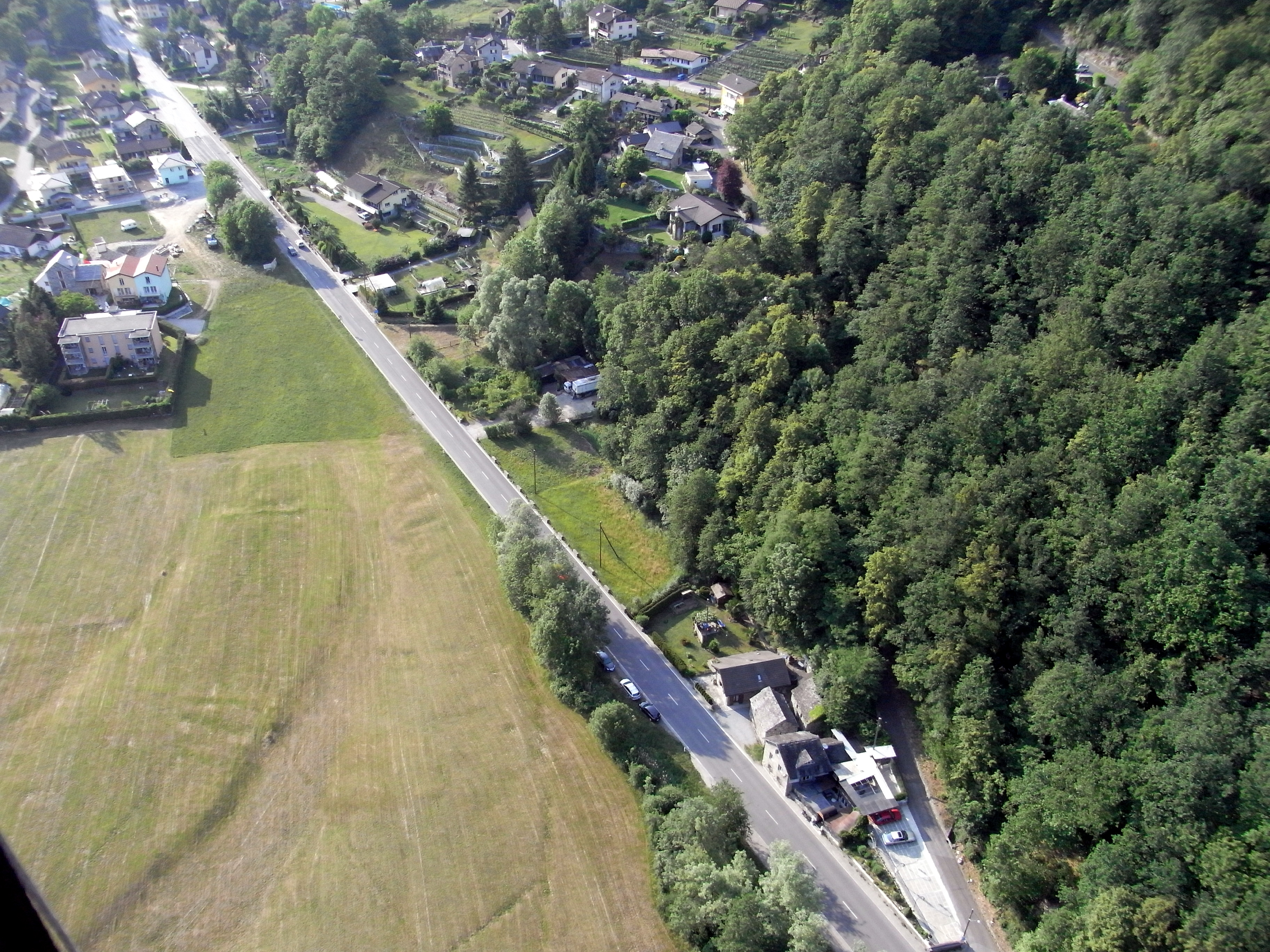
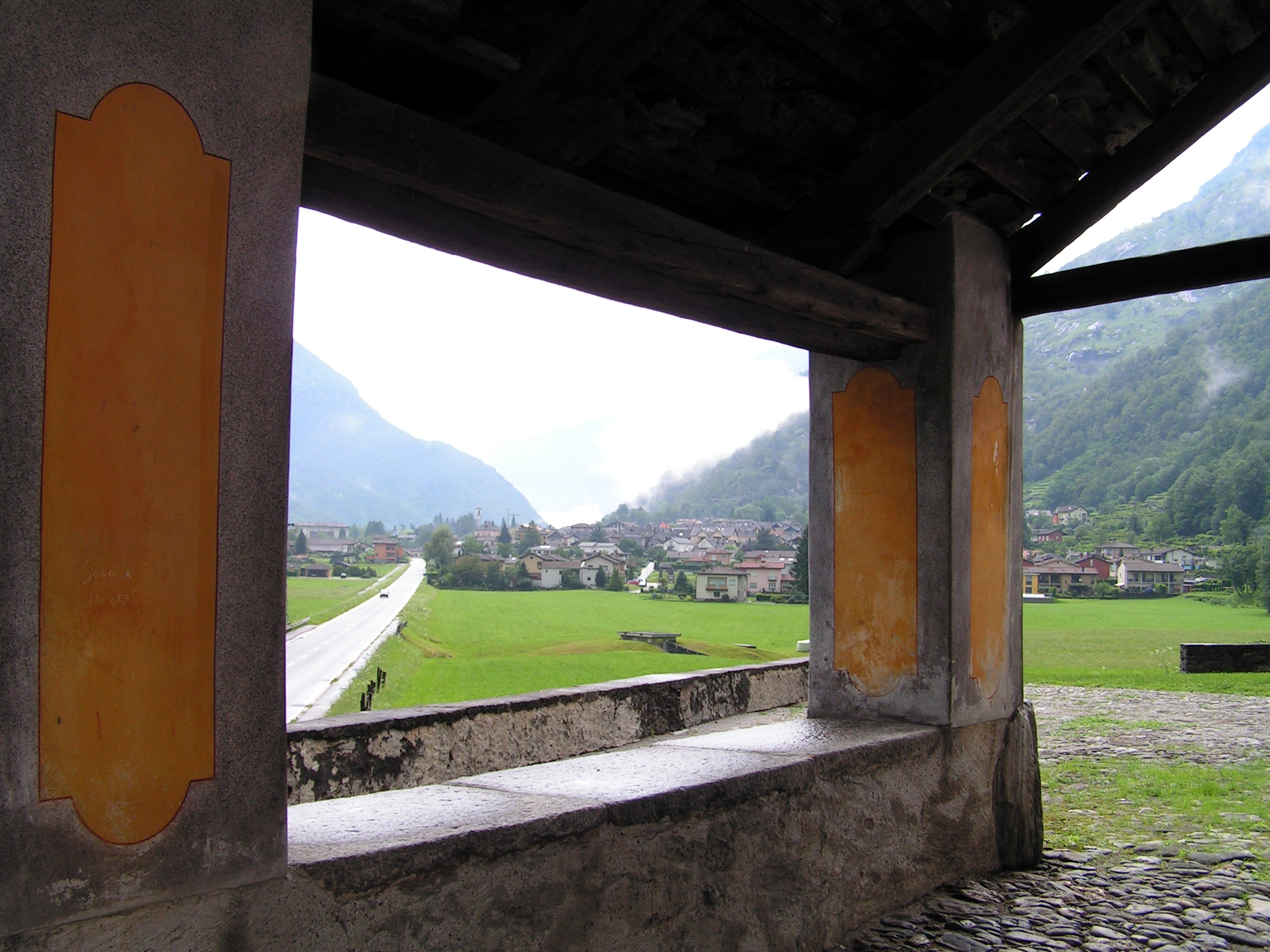
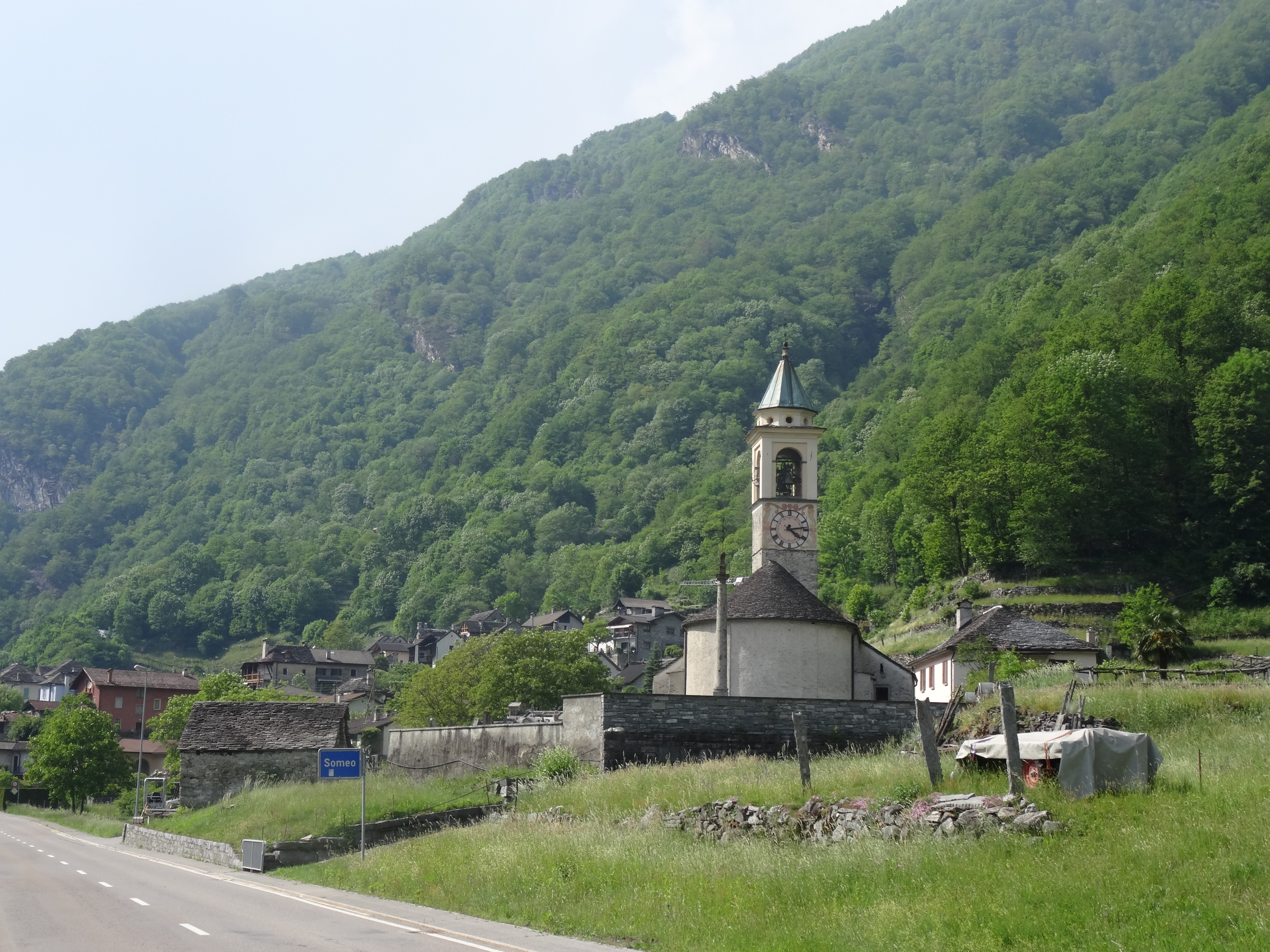
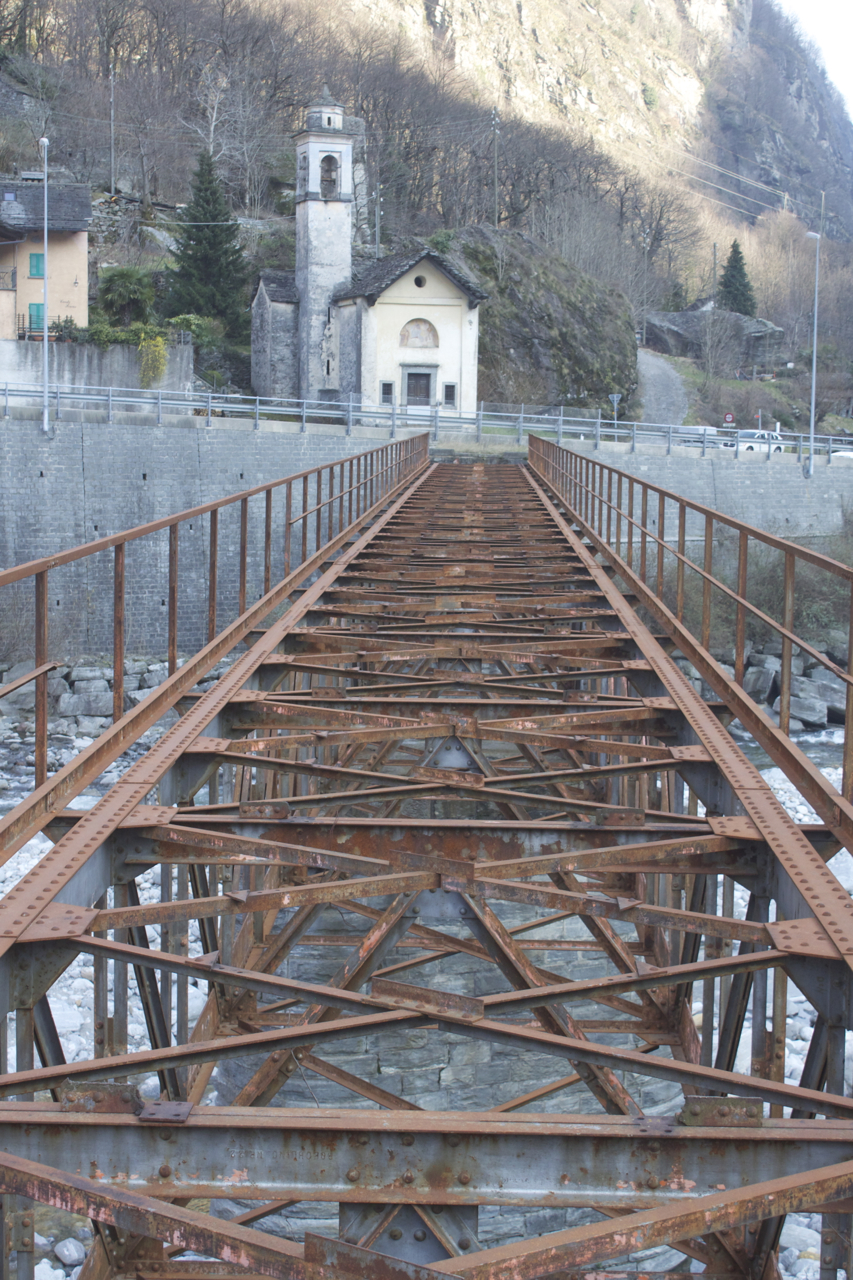
Remains of the line

=== Locarno to Ponte Brolla ===
The railway’s terminus was at the Locarno FART surface station, and after a curve, the line continued straight along the Locarno lakeshore. The railway made a curve and continued straight, passing the former Gas Company & Slaughterhouse freight yard (used only for freight) and, after another curve, ran straight to the Locarno Piazza Castello railway station located at a curve. The line navigated two curves to enter the Locarno Sant'Antonio station, which had a workshop (demolished in 2004) and a locomotive depot (demolished in 1987). After this station, the railway passed a curve, continued straight to the Solduno railway station, and, after crossing a level crossing on via Vallemaggia, headed northwest through a short tunnel called Sass Gött, then navigated several curves to the Ponte Brolla station, the branching point for the Domodossola line. The section from Locarno FART to the San Martino railway station was replaced by a tunnel inaugurated in 1990, while the surface section was decommissioned.

=== Ponte Brolla to Bignasco ===
From the Ponte Brolla station, after a sharp curve toward Bignasco, the line passed the old Ponte Brolla station, used from 1907 to 1923, the 58 m Ponte Brolla tunnel, and immediately after, the bridge over the Maggia, rebuilt in 1951. After the bridge, the line crossed a level crossing, made a curve, and, after a few meters, switched the pantograph from standard to lateral. The railway continued to the right of the cantonal road until the outskirts of Avegno, navigating several curves, crossing a level crossing on the cantonal road, and entering the Avegno railway station. After this locality, the line made several curves, passed through the short Avegno tunnel (now demolished), continued straight, and crossed the 180 m Sass Pietsch tunnel (later converted into a road tunnel). After a level crossing on the cantonal road, the line made two curves and entered the Gordevio railway station, located at a curve. This section has been converted into a cycle path.

From Gordevio, the railway made two curves, then ran alongside the cantonal road, and after another curve, continued straight to the Ronchini stop. After this stop and a short curve, it continued alongside the cantonal road to the Aurigeno-Moghegno railway station, located at a curve and equipped with a siding for freight. After another curve near the Madonna delle Grazie church in Maggia, it continued straight to the Maggia railway station, also located at a curve. From Maggia, the line navigated several curves, crossed a level crossing on the old road, and continued alongside the cantonal road to the Lodano railway station (the passenger building still exists, while the track area has been converted into a road for Lodano). From here, trains passed through straight sections and curves, crossing the villages of Coglio and Giumaglio, where the namesake station was located.

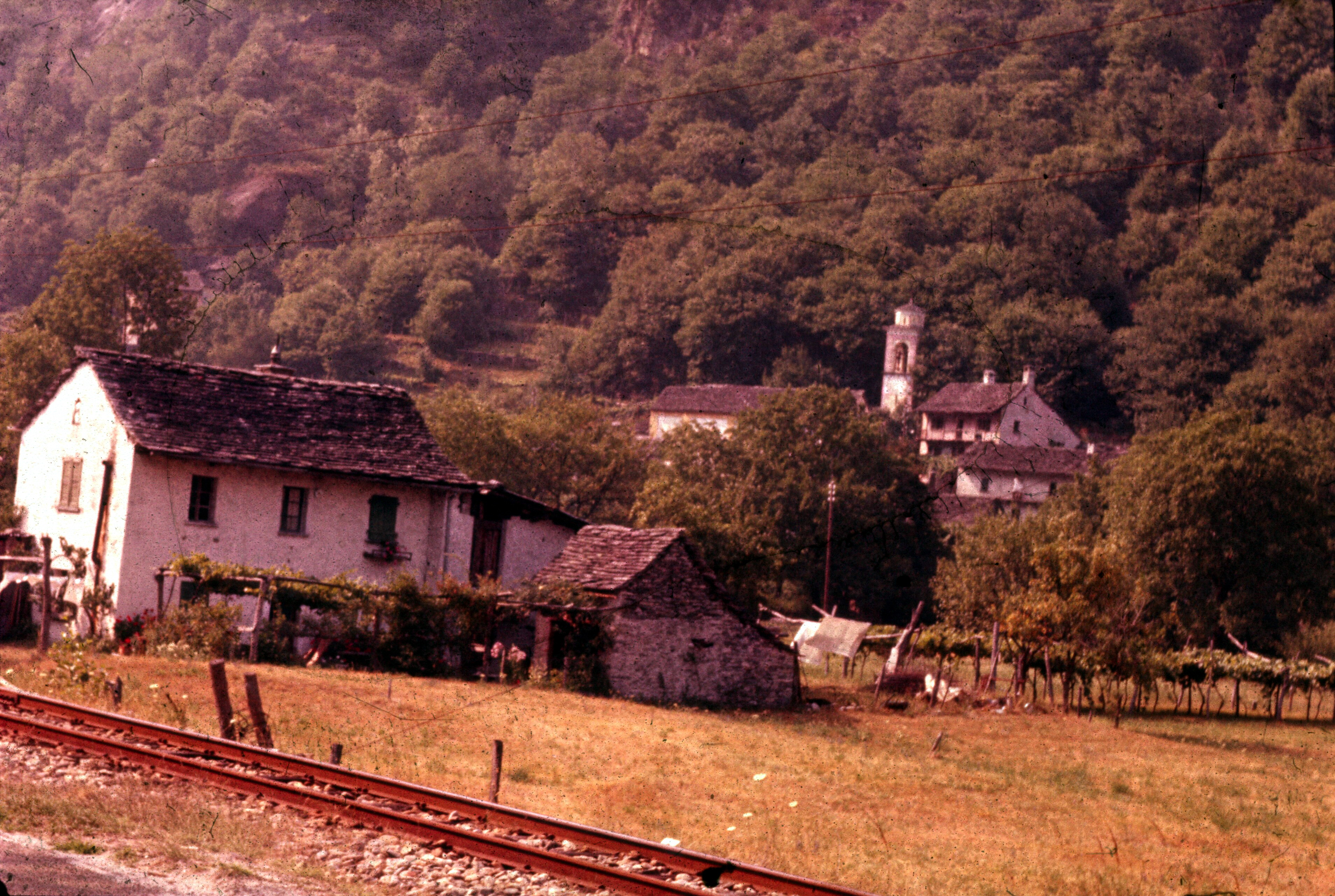
The railway at Riveo in 1962

From here, the line continued straight and, with a route full of curves, reached the Someo railway station (similar to the stations of the Centovallina from 1929 until its closure). After this station, trains crossed a level crossing and continued alongside the cantonal road to the Riveo railway station. At Riveo, the railway played a significant role in granite transport. After this locality, it continued alongside the cantonal road, passing the 50 m Visletto tunnel and, after a few kilometers, ran alongside the San Defendente church (near the church, a plaque commemorates the accident on May 31, 1923), crossing a level crossing and the bridge over the Maggia. The line made a curve and continued straight to the Cevio railway station.

From Cevio, the final section began: after two curves, the line passed the Cevio Ospedale railway station (later demolished). Crossing two level crossings (in Bignaschina) and after a series of curves, it entered the Bignasco railway station, equipped with five tracks and a locomotive depot. No trace of the infrastructure remains, as it was demolished to make way for the current cantonal road.

== See also ==
- Domodossola–Locarno railway

== Bibliography ==
- "Die Valle Maggia-Bahn" [The Valle Maggia Railway]. Schweizerische Bauzeitung (in German). 51 (5). Zurich: Verlag des Herausgebers: 60–63. 1908.
- "Die Valle Maggia-Bahn (Schluss.)" [The Valle Maggia Railway (Conclusion)]. Schweizerische Bauzeitung (in German). 51 (6). Zurich: Verlag des Herausgebers: 70–74. 1908.
- Bruno Donati, ed. (2007). Il treno in una valle alpina [The Train in an Alpine Valley] (in Italian). Locarno: Armando Dadò Editore. ISBN 978-88-8281-212-6.
- Guyer, Roland (1956). "Bahnbrücke über die Maggia bei Ponte Brolla" [Railway Bridge over the Maggia at Ponte Brolla]. Schweizerische Bauzeitung (in German). 74 (24). Zurich: Verlag W. Jeger & A. Ostertag: 361–365.
- Schweyckart, Markus (1997). Elektrische Bahn Locarno-Ponte Brolla-Bignasco [Electric Railway Locarno-Ponte Brolla-Bignasco] (in German). Leissigen: Prellbock Druck & Verlag. ISBN 9783907579053.
- Zindel, Georges (1911). "Elektrische 250 PS-Lokomotive der Valle-Maggia-Bahn" [Electric 250 HP Locomotive of the Valle Maggia Railway]. Schweizerische Bauzeitung (in German). 58 (3). Zurich: Verlag des Herausgebers: 29–33.
