= Verbania–Pallanza railway station =

Railway station in Italy

Verbania–Pallanza
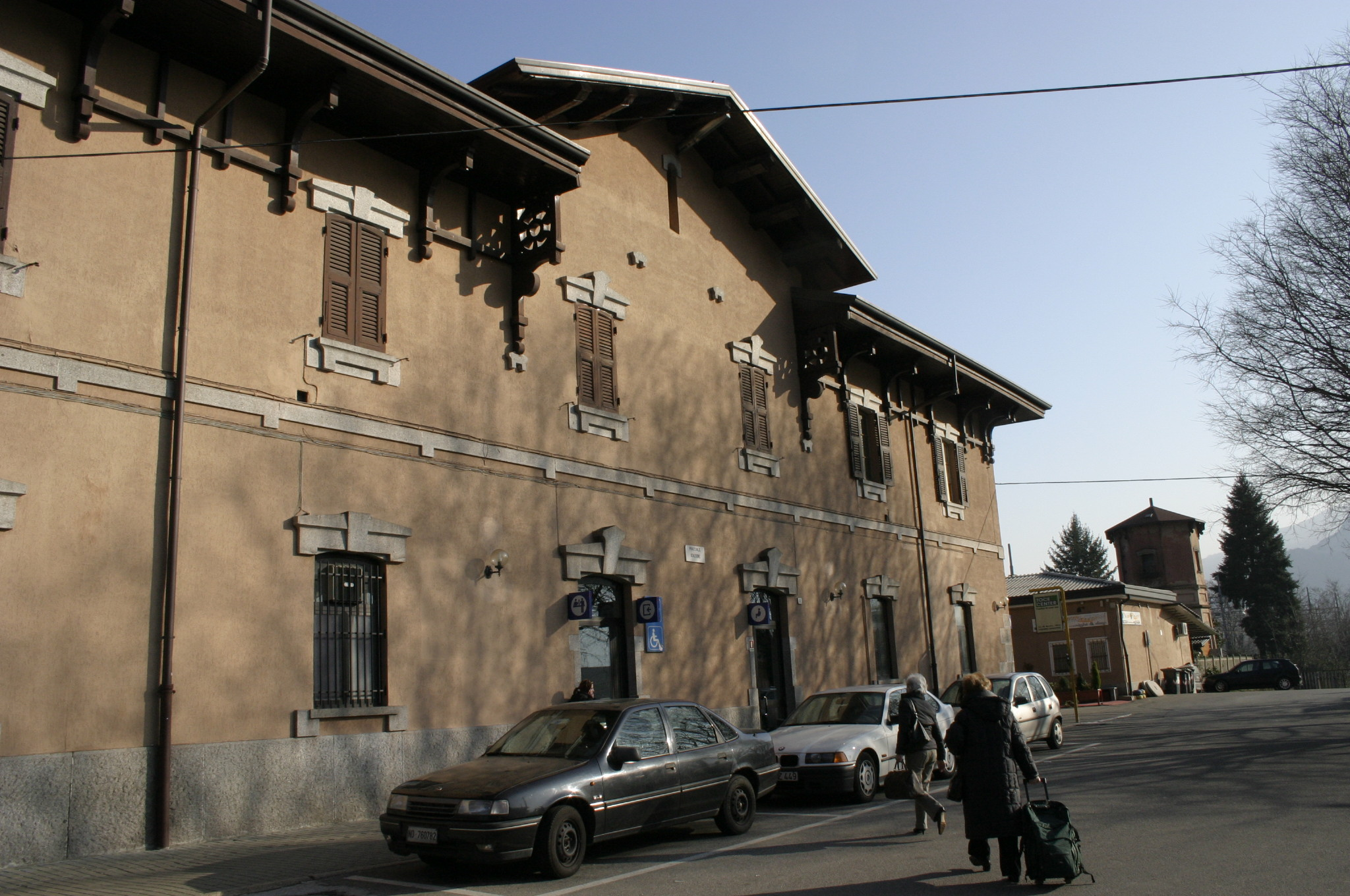
- The passenger building.

General information
- Location: Piazzale Stazione; 28924 Verbania VB; Verbania, Verbano-Cusio-Ossola, Piedmont; Italy
- Coordinates: 45°56′38″N 08°28′19″E
- Operator: Rete Ferroviaria Italiana; Centostazioni
- Line: Milan–Domodossola
- Distance: 26.074 km (16.202 mi) from Arona
- Train operators: Trenord; Trenitalia
- Connections: Urban and suburban buses

Other information
- Classification: Silver

History
- Opened: 16 January 1905; 121 years ago

Services
Preceding station	Trenord	Following station
Domodossola Terminus	RE4	Stresa towards Milano Centrale
Location
- Location within Piedmont Location within Northern Italy Location within Italy

Verbania–Pallanza railway station (Italian: Stazione di Verbania-Pallanza) serves the city and comune of Verbania, in the Piedmont region, northwestern Italy. Opened in 1905, it forms part of the Milan–Domodossola railway.

The station is currently managed by Rete Ferroviaria Italiana (RFI). However, the commercial area of the passenger building is managed by Centostazioni. Train services are operated by Trenitalia. Each of these companies is a subsidiary of Ferrovie dello Stato Italiane (FS), Italy's state-owned rail company.

== Location ==
Verbania-Pallanza railway station is situated in the Fondotoce district of Verbania. It is sandwiched between Lake Mergozzo and the river Toce, just upstream from where the Toce flows into Lake Maggiore.

== History ==
The station was opened on 16 January 1905, together with the rest of the Arona–Domodossola section of the Milan–Domodossola railway.

The composite name Verbania-Pallanza denotes the station's location within the borders of the former town of Pallanza, which, in 1939, was merged with Intra to form the current comune of Verbania.

== Features ==
The station yard consists of three tracks. Two are operating lines, used by trains coming from the direction of Milan or from Domodossola, respectively. The third is currently not used. This configuration supports a smooth flow of passengers, primarily in the direction of Milan. As at January 2010, the station was not served by the EuroCity trains travelling between Milan and Domodossola.

== Interchange ==
The station is interchange with the suburban bus line linking Verbania with Omegna, operated by VCO Trasporti.

== Services ==
As of the December 2023 timetable change, the following services stop at Verbania-Pallanza:

- RegioExpress: service every two hours between Domodossola and Milano Centrale.
- Regionale: service every two hours between Domodossola and Milano Porta Garibaldi.

== See also ==
- History of rail transport in Italy
- List of railway stations in Piedmont
- Rail transport in Italy
- Railway stations in Italy
