= Locarno FART railway station =

Meter gauge railway station in Locarno, Ticino, Switzerland

Locarno FART
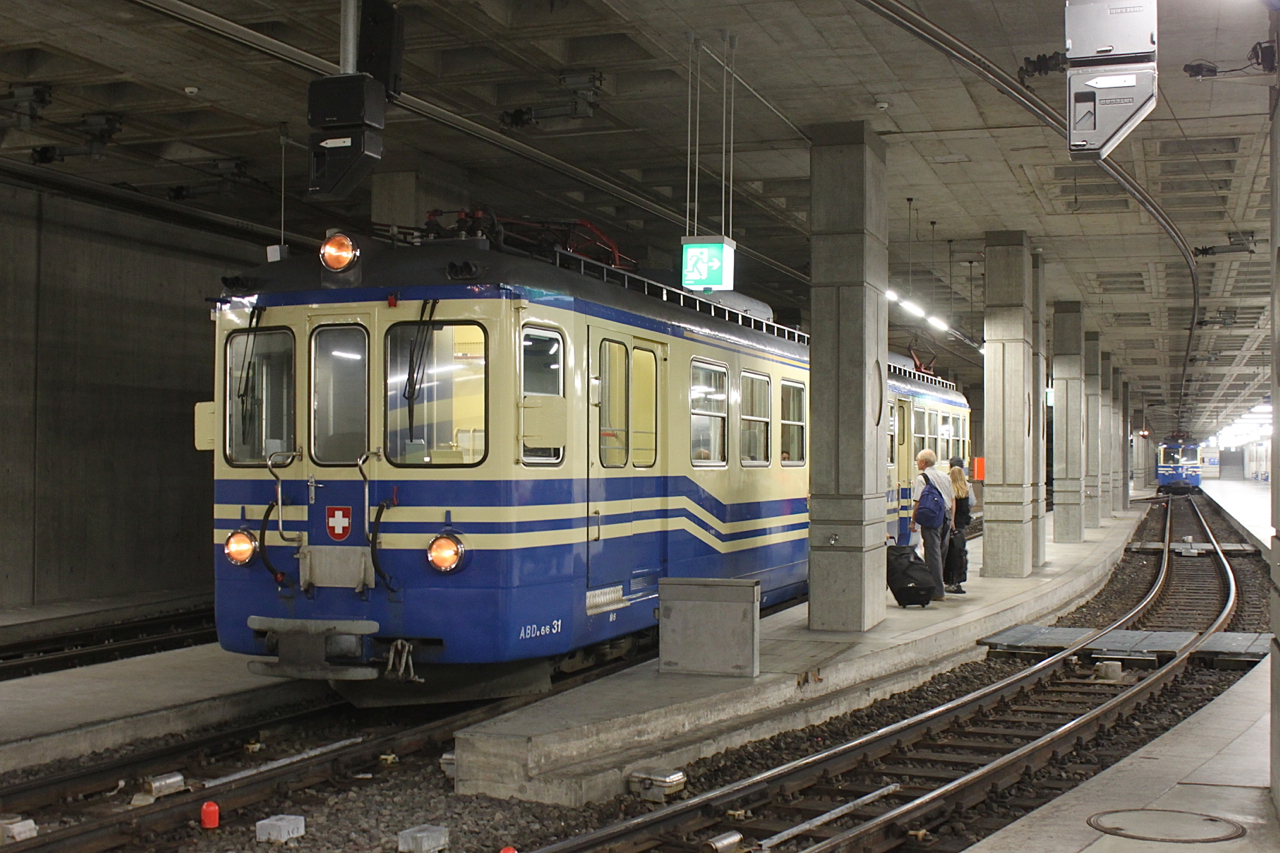
- A FART train at the station in 2011

General information
- Location: Muralto, Ticino; Switzerland
- Coordinates: 46°10′22″N 8°48′08″E
- Elevation: 205 m (673 ft)
- Owner: Regional Bus and Rail Company of Ticino
- Line: Domodossola–Locarno line
- Platforms: 1 island platform; 1 side platform
- Tracks: 2
- Train operators: Regional Bus and Rail Company of Ticino
- Connections: Locarno

Construction
- Structure type: Underground

Other information
- Fare zone: 300 (arcobaleno)

History
- Opened: 17 December 1990

Services
Preceding station	FART	Following station
Locarno San Antonio towards Domodossola	Panorama Express	Terminus
Locarno San Antonio towards Camedo	Regio	Terminus
Location

Locarno FART railway station (Italian: Stazione di Locarno FART) is a railway station that serves the city of Locarno, in the Swiss canton of Ticino. It is the Swiss terminus of the cross-border metre gauge railway line from Domodossola in Italy, which opened in 1923. Until 1990 these trains terminated in the forecourt of the mainline station, after passing through the streets of Locarno. This was replaced by a new underground station and section of line.

Since 1990, the station has been located underneath and physically connected to Locarno station, the city's primary railway station, although they do not share any tracks. The station is the eastern terminus of the 1,000 mm (3 ft 3 3/8 in) metre gauge Domodossola–Locarno line of the Regional Bus and Rail Company of Ticino (Italian: Ferrovie Autolinee Regionali Ticinesi, FART).

== Services ==
As of the December 2020 timetable change, the following services stop at Locarno FART:

- Panorama Express / Regio: hourly service to Domodossola and frequent service to Camedo.
