= Domodossola railway station =

Railway station in Domodossola, Italy

Domodossola
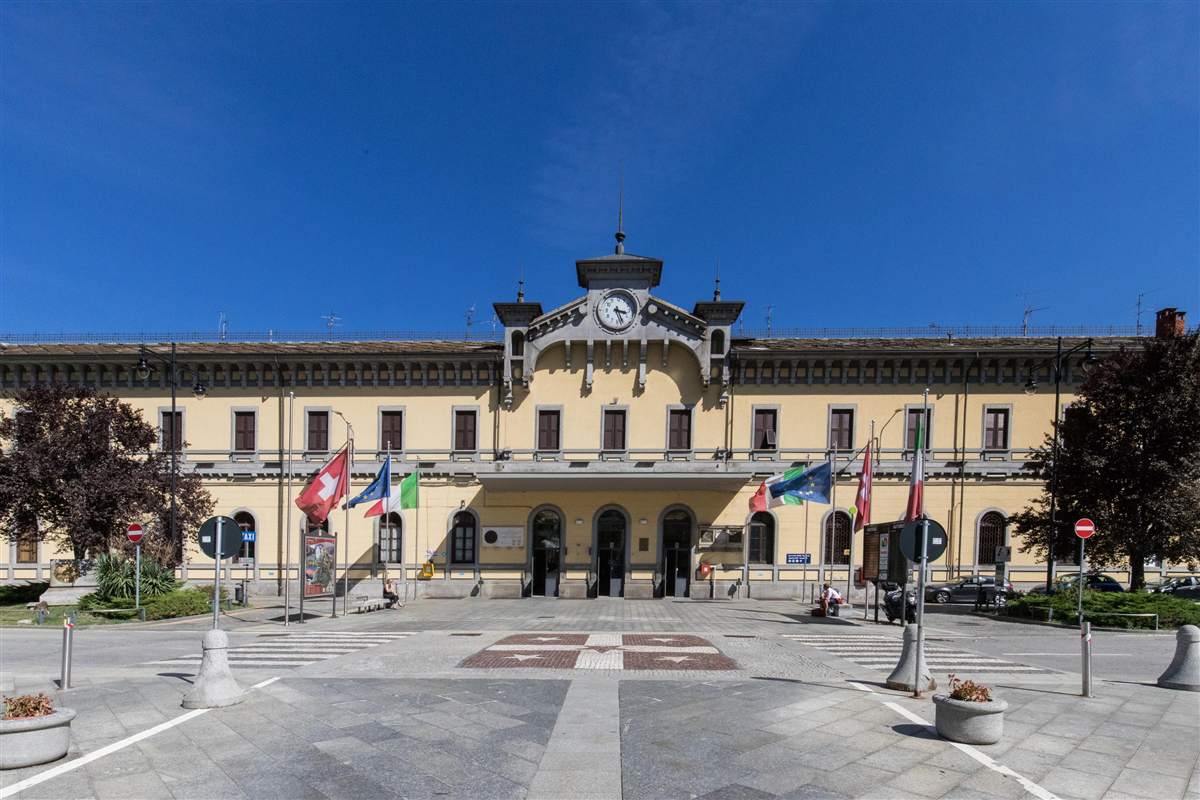
- The station building in 2024

General information
- Location: Piazza Giacomo Matteotti; Domodossola; Italy
- Coordinates: 46°06′55″N 8°17′46″E
- Owner: Rete Ferroviaria Italiana
- Operator: Centostazioni
- Lines: Domodossola–Locarno line; Domodossola–Novara line; Milan–Domodossola line; Simplon line
- Distance: 55.547 km (34.515 mi) from Arona
- Train operators: BLS AG; Società Subalpina Imprese Ferroviarie; Swiss Federal Railways; Trenitalia; Trenord
- Connections: Regional and interurban buses

Construction
- Accessible: No

Other information
- Classification: Gold

History
- Opened: 8 September 1888
- Electrified: 4 May 1947

Services
Preceding station	Trenitalia	Following station
Brig towards Basel SBB	EuroCity	Stresa towards Milano Centrale
Brig towards Genève-Cornavin	EuroCity	Stresa towards Milano Centrale or Venezia Santa Lucia
Terminus	Regionale	Villadossola towards Novara
Preceding station	SBB CFF FFS	Following station
Brig Terminus	IR	Terminus
Preceding station	BLS	Following station
Preglia towards Bern	RE1	Terminus
Brig Terminus	RE2	Terminus
Brig towards Visp	RE2	Terminus
Iselle di Trasquera towards Visp	RE2	Terminus
Preceding station	Trenord	Following station
Terminus	RE4	Verbania-Pallanza towards Milano Centrale
Preceding station	FART	Following station
Terminus	Panorama Express	Masera towards Locarno FART
Location
- Location within Piedmont Location within Northern Italy Location within Italy

Domodossola railway station (Italian: Stazione di Domodossola) serves the city and comune of Domodossola, in the Piedmont region of northwestern Italy. Opened in 1888, it forms a major break of gauge junction between standard gauge lines to Milan, Brig and Novara, and a metre gauge line to Locarno.

The station is managed by Rete Ferroviaria Italiana (RFI), the commercial area of the passenger building by Centostazioni, while train services on the line to Novara are operated by Trenitalia. Each of these companies is a subsidiary of Ferrovie dello Stato Italiane (FS), Italy's state-owned rail company. The link with Milan is operated by both Trenitalia and Trenord.

Train services on the line to Brig are operated by BLS AG and Swiss Federal Railways, and those on the line to Locarno by the Società Subalpina Imprese Ferroviarie (SSIF). These two lines combine to form an international link, via Domodossola, between the German and Italian speaking parts of Switzerland.

== Location ==
Domodossola railway station is situated at Piazza Giacomo Matteotti, at the eastern edge of the city centre.

== History ==
The station was opened on 9 September 1888, together with the rest of the Domodossola–Arona section of the Milan–Domodossola railway. It was built as part of a railway construction project planned since the 1870s. The aim of the project was to break the isolation of the Ossola valley, by connecting it with Novara and Turin.

On 1 June 1906, Domodossola was extended to become an international facility, upon the opening of the Simplon Tunnel and the Brig–Domodossola railway that passes through it. The architect was Luigi Boffi who died in 1904, the station was built to his design following his death.

The metre gauge connection between Domodossola and Locarno entered service on 27 November 1923.

== Features ==
The passenger building has a significant architectural façade, with a string course of Baveno granite and three cornices.

== Passenger movements ==
The station has about 1.4 million passenger movements each year.

== Interchange ==
From the bus terminal located near the station there are direct buses to the main municipalities in the Ossola valley, and inter-urban routes to Verbania, Omegna and Milan Malpensa Airport.

== Services ==
The following trains stop at Domodossola:

- EuroCity/InterRegio/RegioExpress: trains roughly every hour to Brig, with continuing service to Basel SBB, Bern, Genève-Cornavin, and Milano Centrale.
- RegioExpress: service every two hours to Milano Centrale.
- Regionale:
  - service every one or two hours to Novara.
  - service every two hours to Milano Porta Garibaldi.
- FART: hourly service to Locarno FART.

== See also ==
- History of rail transport in Italy
- List of railway stations in Piedmont
- Rail transport in Italy
- Railway stations in Italy
