= Domodossola–Locarno railway line =

Narrow gauge railway line in Switzerland and Italy

Coordinates: 46°09′45″N 8°38′14″E

Domodossola–Locarno
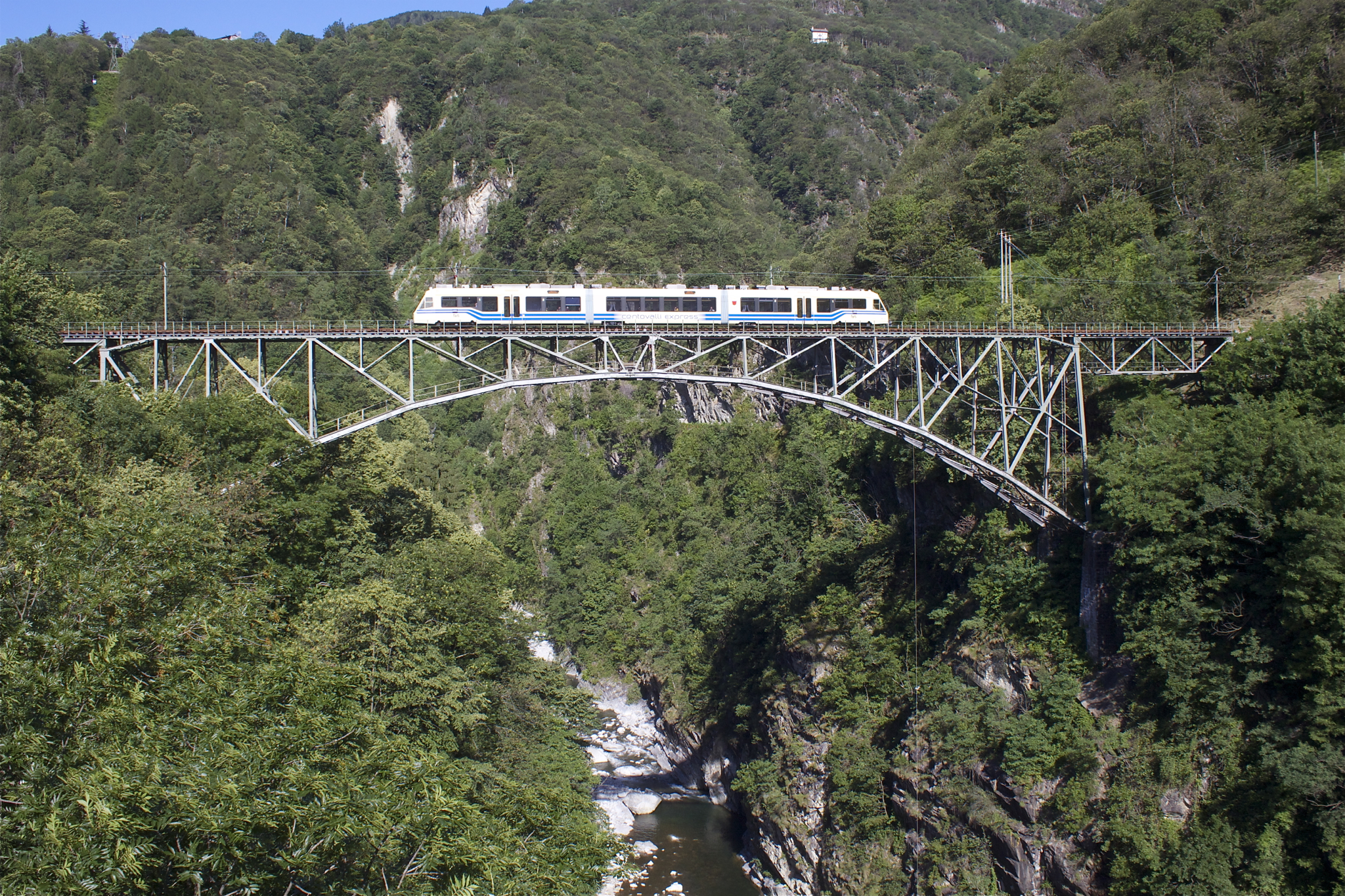
- ABe 4/8 48 on the Isorno bridge near Intragna

Overview
- Status: Operational
- Locale: Centovalli and Valle Vigezzo
- Termini: Domodossola; Locarno
- Stations: 22

Service
- Operators: FART; SSIF

History
- Opened: 1923

Technical
- Line length: 52.1 kilometres (32.37 mi)
- Number of tracks: 1 main track with dual track at certain stations.
- Track gauge: 1,000 mm (3 ft 3 3/8 in) metre gauge
- Electrification: 1350 V DC

The Domodossola–Locarno railway line, informally called the Centovallina in Switzerland and the Vigezzina in Italy, is a metre-gauge railway negotiating the dramatic mountainous terrain between Domodossola, Italy, and Locarno, Switzerland. It passes through the Vigezzo Valley (Italian side) and Centovalli (Swiss side).

It touches the villages of Druogno, Santa Maria Maggiore, Malesco and Intragna and carried over 1 million passengers in 2010. It is operated by the Ferrovie Autolinee Regionali Ticinesi (FART) in Switzerland and the Società Subalpina Imprese Ferroviarie (SSIF) in Italy.

Opened on 25 November 1923, the 52-kilometre (32 mi) long railway has 30 stations and takes approximately 2 hours to traverse the whole length. The Italian-Swiss border is crossed between the towns of Ribellasca and Camedo.

== History ==
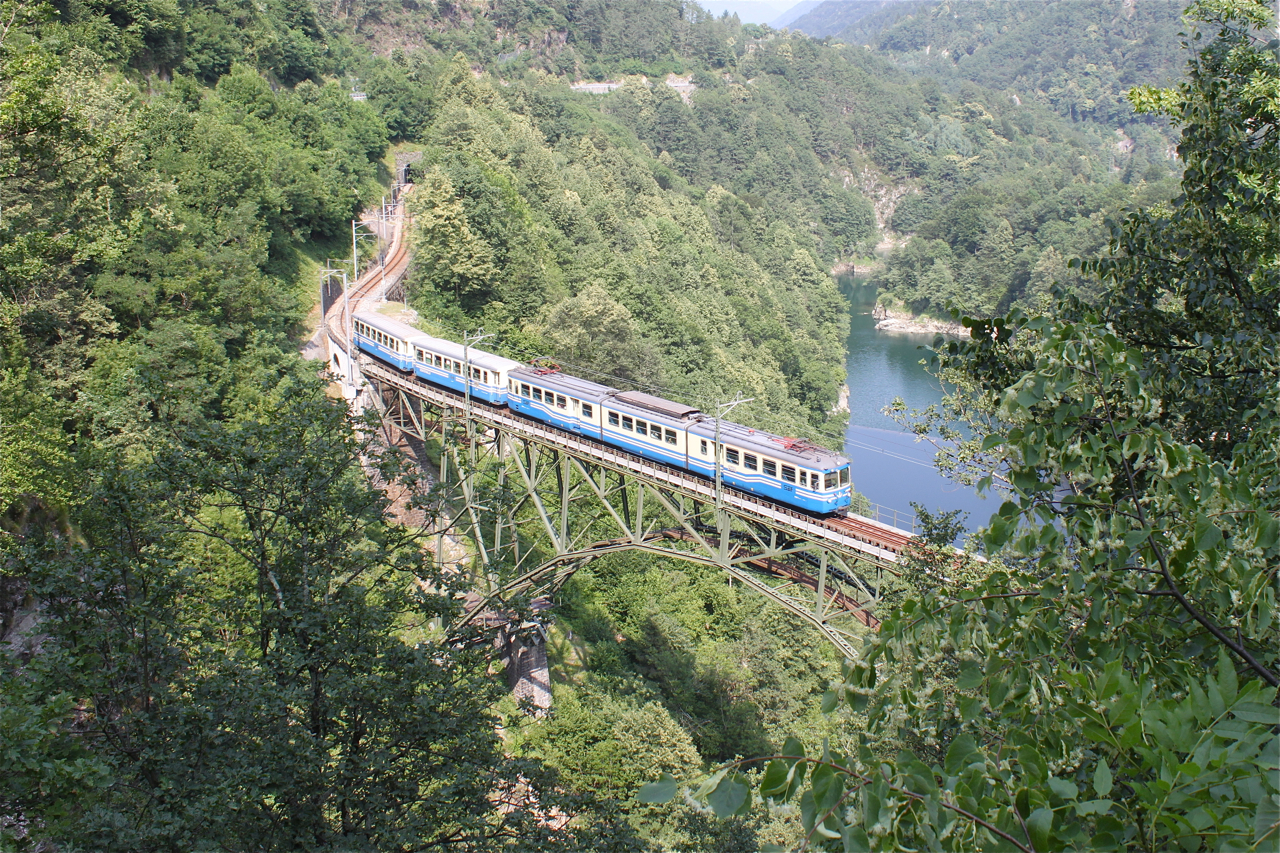
ABe 8/8 23 passing Ruinacci bridge over Palagnedra lake

Following a convention signed in Rome on 12 November 1918 between the plenipotentiaries Sidney Sonnino and De Segesser, respectively, of the King of Italy and the Federal Council of the Swiss Confederation, the construction of the railway began. The railway started with an initiative mainly due to the then-Mayor of Locarno, Francis Dance. The builders used part of the existing metre gauge Locarno-Ponte Brolla-Bignasco railway line at the start of the eastern end of the new line. This set the metre gauge of the whole line. The new line from Ponte Brolla to Domodossola opened on 27 November 1923. The Ponte Brolla-Bignasco section closed in 1965. The line was re-routed to a new underground station at Locarno FART in 1990.

Since then the railway has regularly performed its task of connecting the communities between Locarno and Domodossola. The line continued after the period of mass motorization, when some considered the train to be obsolete.

The railway currently plays an important economic and tourist function in the area. It is the shortest and most scenic link between the major trans-Alpine railways that pass through the Simplon and Gotthard tunnels. Combined with the Simplon railway, it provides a fast connection between the Swiss Cantons of Valais and Ticino.

== 1978 flood ==
On 7 August 1978, a flood struck the railway, causing damage affecting almost 700 metres of track, mainly on the Italian side. Thankfully, there were no injuries but reconstruction of the line lasted until the end of the year.

== Specifications ==
- Gauge: 1,000 mm (3 ft 3 3/8 in) metre gauge
- Length: about 52.2 km (of which 32.300 is in Italian territory, 19.833 in Switzerland)
- Voltage: 1,350 V DC
- Electrical substations: 5 (including 3 in Switzerland)
- Stations and stops with passing loops: 21 (13 in Italian territory, 8 in Switzerland)
- Passengers transported annually between 1982 and 1985:
  - 1982 - 896,411
  - 1983 - 917,737
  - 1984 - 852,381
  - 1985 - 869,215

== Route ==
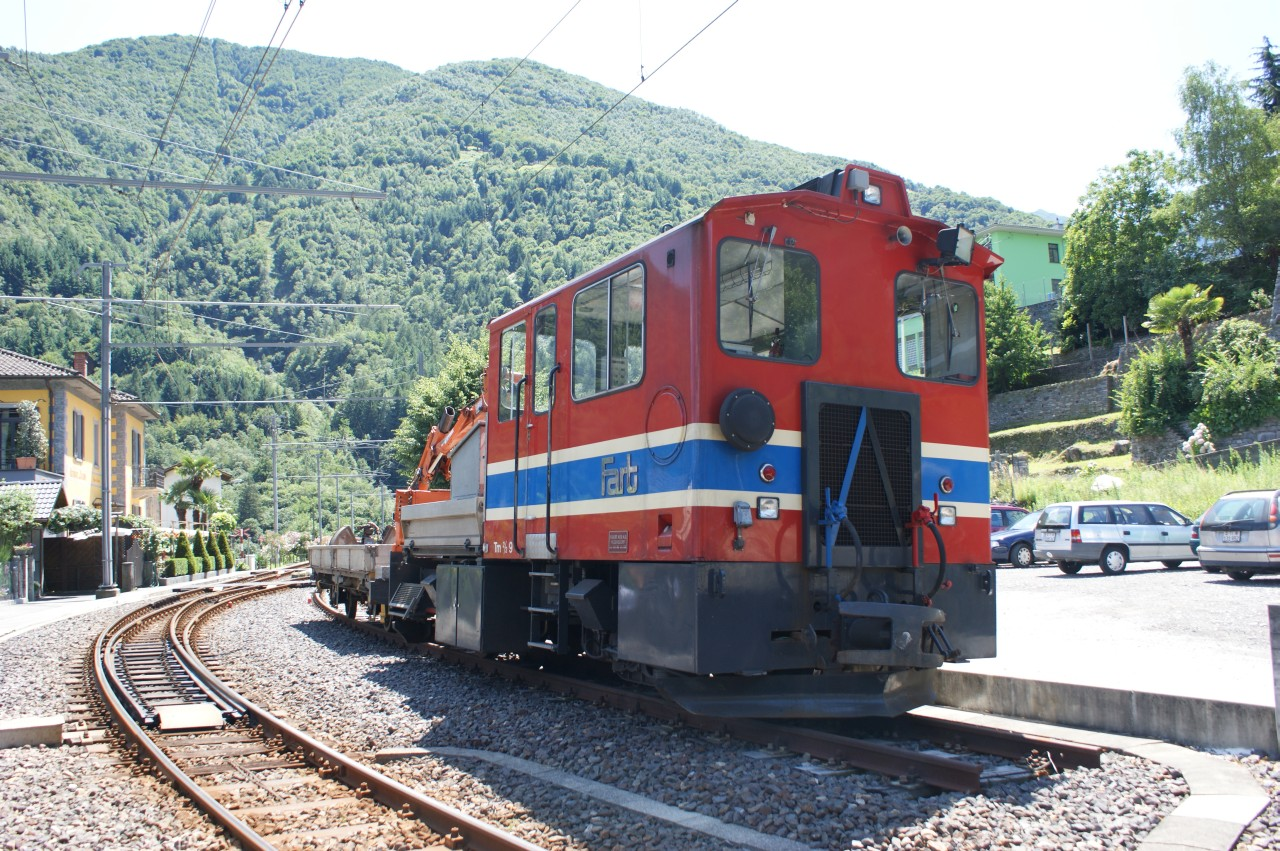
Engine Tm 2/2 9 of the maintenance team in Intragna station

The route, like other mountain railways, has some dramatic inclines between the Masera and Santa Maria Maggiore (Italy), and between Verdasio and Intragna (Switzerland); in some places the gradient is 60 per thousand.

A trip between Domodossola and Locarno takes slightly less than 2 hours. The railroad connects with the Swiss national railway terminals at both ends. At Locarno, trains run frequently to scenic Lugano.

The name "Centovalli" (100 valleys) derives from the existence of the many valleys along the line upon which are perched small towns. The mountainous geography means that there are many bridges and viaducts to admire on a journey. The trip is exceptionally scenic and negotiates many gorges.

== Fares and equipment ==
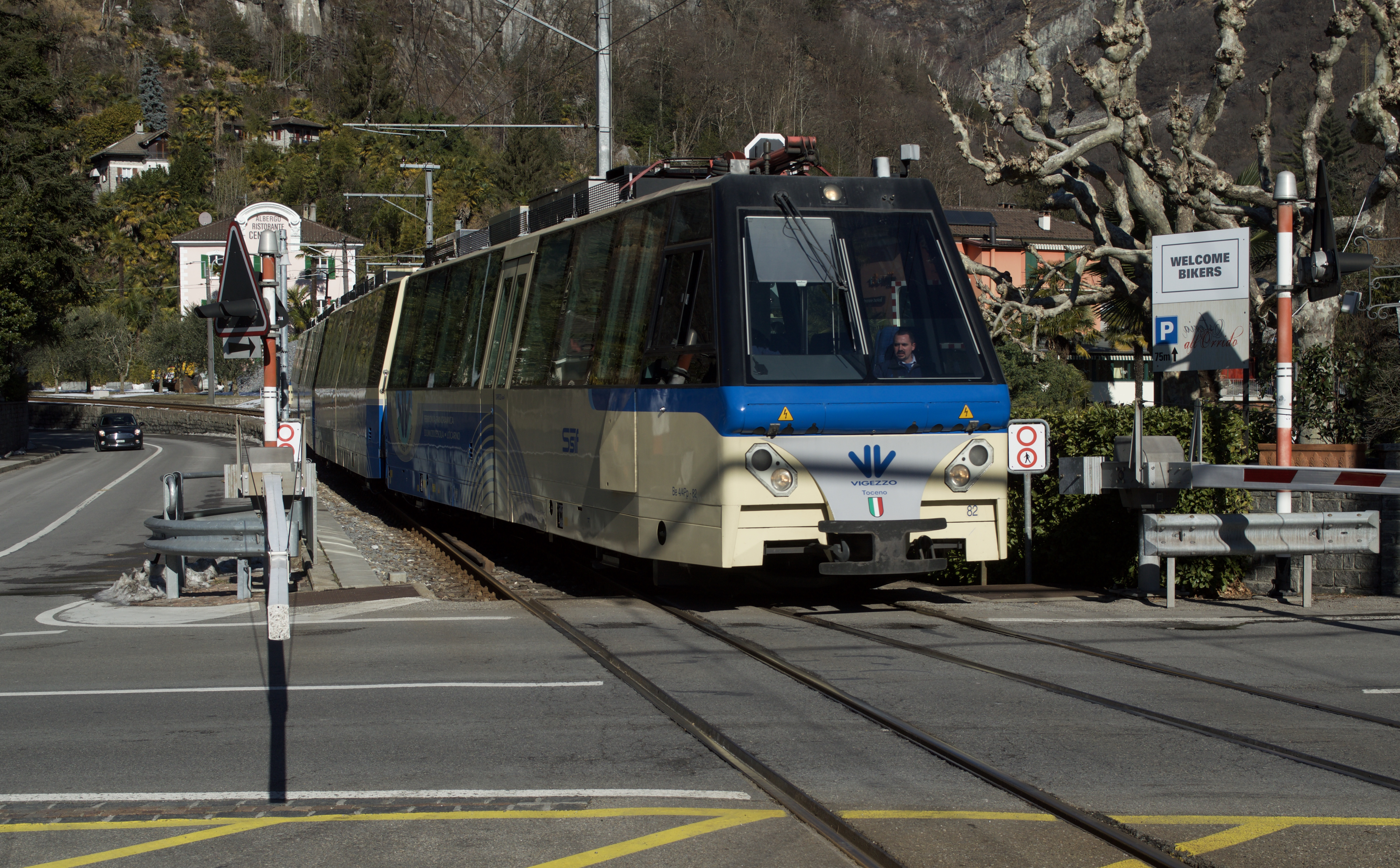
Panoramic train at Ponte Brolla

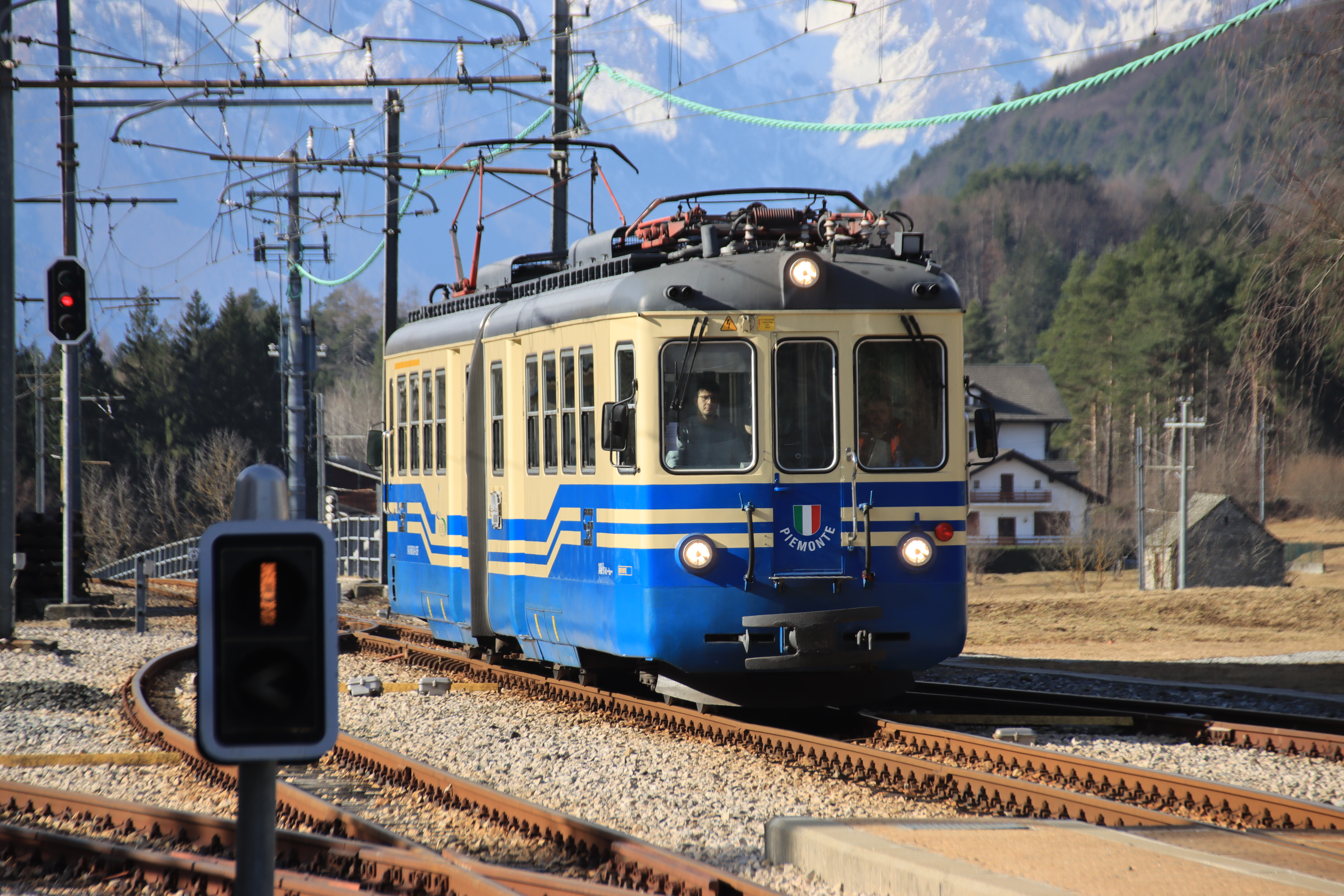
Classic train at Santa Maria Maggiore

Since at least October 2012, there is new rolling stock called the "panoramic train". When taking this train, regardless of the type of ticket held, a supplement of €1.50 or CHF1.50 per passenger is collected, in cash, on board by the conductor. The departure board mentions "supplemento" for runs on the panoramic train. The supplement is not collected on other trains on the route; however, for much of the day, there is no alternative between Camedo and Domodossola.

Similarly to the international Brig–Domodossola connection (through the Simplon Tunnel), the entire Domodossola–Locarno line is included in the scope of the various Swiss Rail flat rate and discount passes (excluding supplements), the Brig–Locarno route constituting a shortcut between western Switzerland and Ticino. The Swiss portion of the line is managed by Ferrovie Autolinee Regionali Ticinesi (FART). The Italian portion of the line is managed by the Società Subalpina Imprese Ferroviarie (SSIF).

== See also ==
- Rail transport in Italy
- Rail transport in Switzerland
- Locarno-Ponte Brolla-Bignasco railway
