= Arona railway station =

Railway station in Italy

Arona
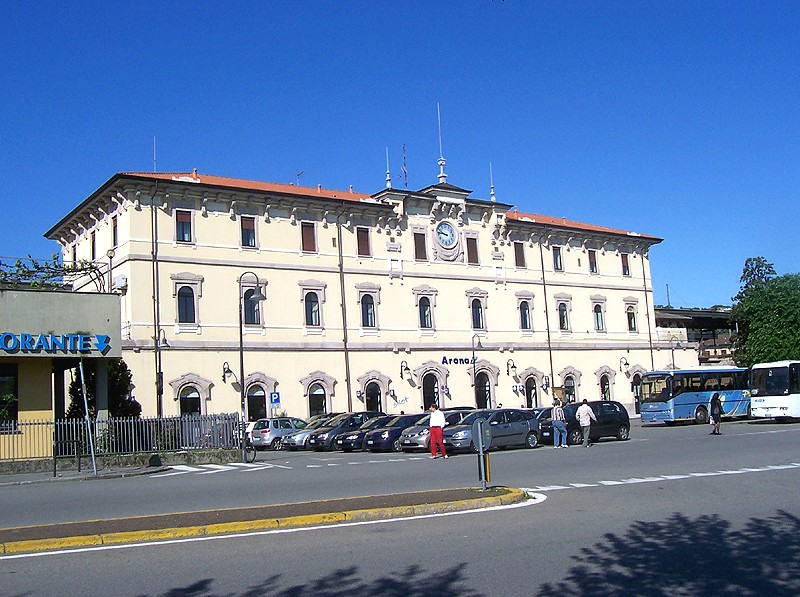

General information
- Location: Largo Duca d'Aosta 1, Arona; Arona, Novara, Piedmont; Italy
- Coordinates: 45°45′19″N 08°33′34″E
- Owner: Rete Ferroviaria Italiana
- Lines: Domodossola–Milan; Arona–Novara; Santhià–Arona (closed)
- Train operators: Trenord; Trenitalia

Other information
- Classification: Silver

History
- Opened: 1905

Services
Preceding station	Trenord	Following station
Stresa towards Domodossola	RE4	Sesto Calende towards Milano Centrale
Preceding station	Trenitalia	Following station
Terminus	Regionale	Dormelleto Paese towards Novara
Location
- Location within Piedmont Location within Northern Italy Location within Italy

Arona railway station (Italian: Stazione di Arona) serves the town and comune of Arona, in the Piedmont region of northwestern Italy.

The station forms part of the Lombard railway service, with local and direct connections with Milan.

== Services ==
As of the December 2023 timetable change, the following services stop at Arona:

- RegioExpress: service every two hours between Domodossola and Milano Centrale.
- Regionale: service every two hours between Domodossola and Milano Porta Garibaldi and rush-hour service to Novara.
