= Regional Bus and Rail Company of Ticino =

Swiss local railway company

Ferrovie Autolinee Regionali Ticinesi SA

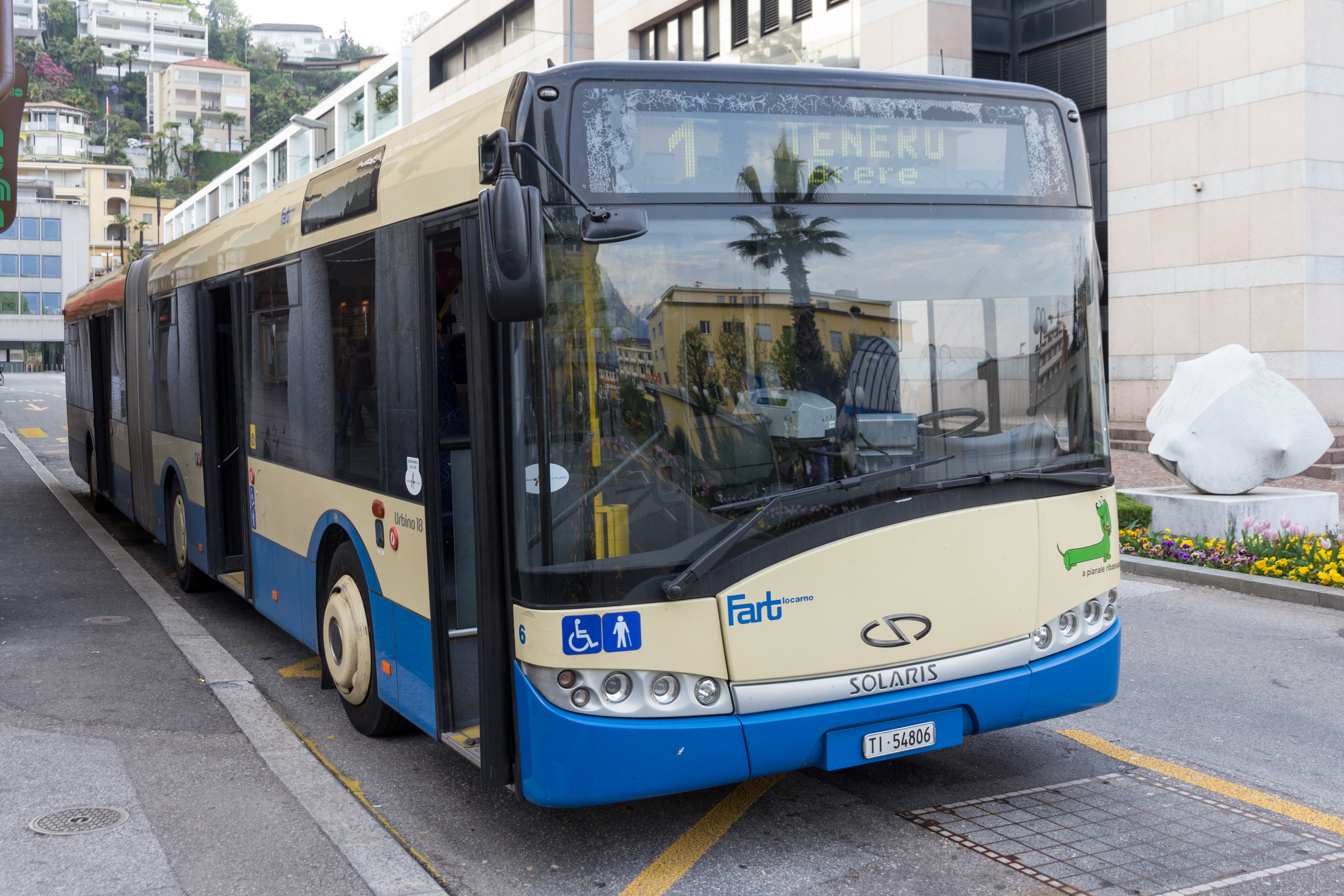
- FART bus in Ascona
- Industry: Bus and rail transport
- Founded: 30 June 1961; 64 years ago
- Headquarters: Locarno, Ticino, Switzerland
- Divisions: Passenger
- Website: fartiamo.ch/en/ (in English)

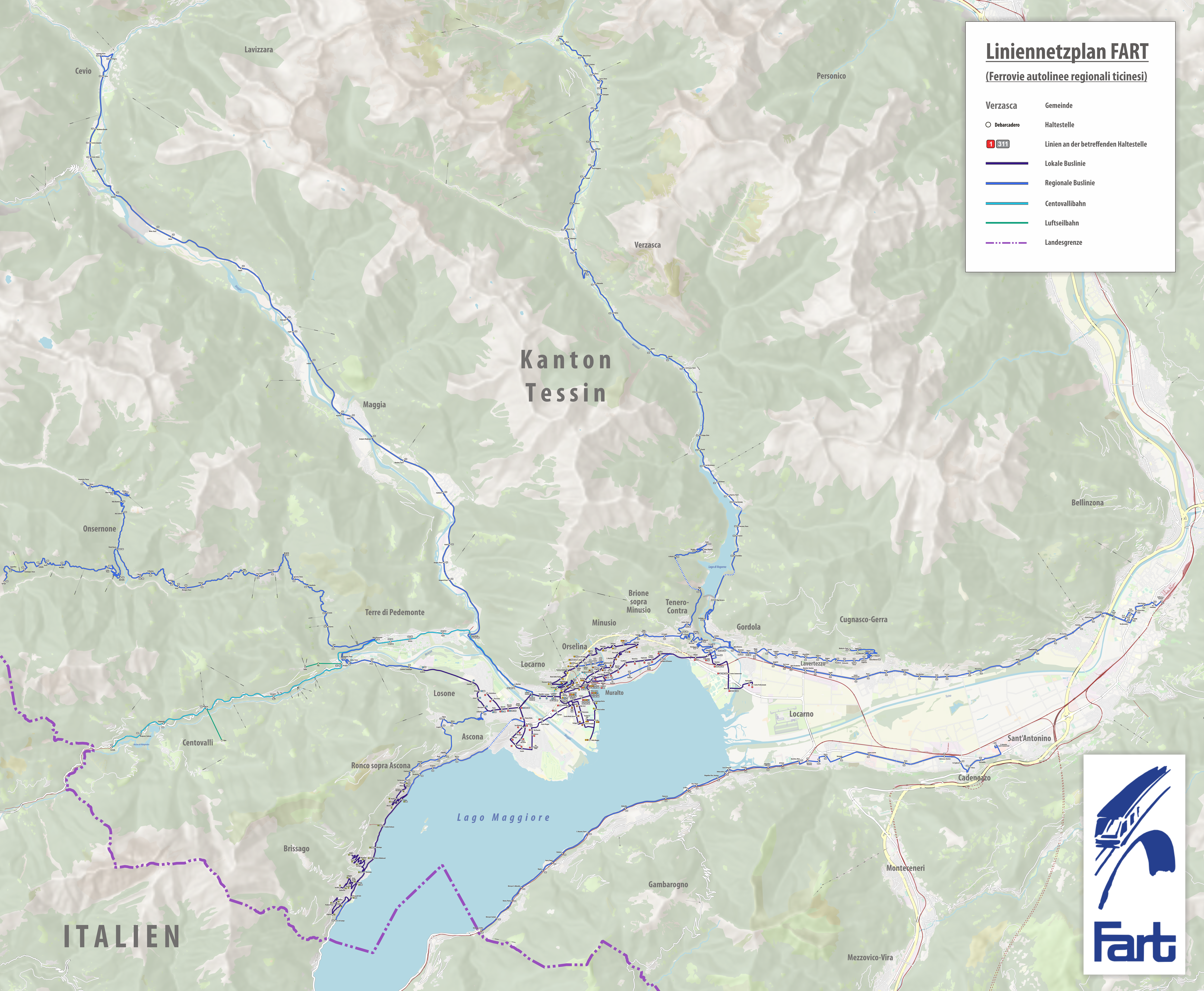
Route map (as of December 2024)

The Regional Bus and Rail Company of Ticino (Italian: Ferrovie Autolinee Regionali Ticinesi SA, known by its Italian initials FART) is a limited company in the Swiss southern canton of Ticino, which provides the urban and suburban bus network in and around Locarno in Switzerland. It also operates the cable cars between Verdasio and Rasa, Ticino, and between Intragna–Pila–Costa on behalf of the owning companies. Together with the Italian company Società Subalpina Imprese Ferroviarie (SSIF) they operate the railway between Locarno and Domodossola, known as the Centovallina in Switzerland and Vigezzina in Italy.

FART is a member of the Arcobaleno tariff network.

== Bus lines ==
Line	Type	Route	Stops	Distance (in km)	Time (in min)
1	Local bus	Gordola Centro Professionale – Losone Sottochiesa	38	14	43
3	Local bus	Locarno Stazione – Brione sopra Minusio Chiesa	25	9	27
4	Local bus	Locarno Delta Maggia – Brione sopra Minusio Chiesa	20	6	28
5	Local bus	Ascona Sonnenhof – Ascona Monte Verità	20		
7	Local bus	Locarno Piazza Stazione – Losone Zandone	19	6	21
8	Local bus	Brissago Municipio – Ronco sopra Ascona Posta	25		
311	Regional bus	Locarno Rotonda – Bellinzona Stazione	47	21	50
312	Regional bus	Locarno Rotonda – Mergoscia Posta	32	13	40
314	Regional bus	Locarno Stazione – Ronco sopra Ascona Chiesa	23	9	23
315	Regional bus	Locarno Stazione – Cavergno Paese	30	30	55
316	Regional bus	Locarno Stazione – Brissago Co’ di Campo	23	12	30

== Centovallina/Vigezzina railway ==
Centovallina/Vigezzina railway line through the Swiss Centovalli and the Italian Valle Vigezzo connects the Gotthard trans-Alpine rail route at Locarno railway station with the Simplon trans-Alpine route at Domodossola, Italy. There are 10 stations on the Swiss side of the frontier and 12 stations on the Italian side, the complete rail journey takes about 1 hour and 45 minutes. Apart from being an important public service, the route of the railway is very scenic and popular with tourists.

Line	Type	Route	Stops	Distance (in km)	Time (in min)
620	Centovalli railway	Locarno FART – Centovalli Camedo	14	20	40

=== Rolling stock ===
Traffic on the Centovallina and Vigezzina is fully in the hand of electric motor coaches. A series of 12 articulated EMUs ABe 4/6, built in 1992 by Vevey Technologies made up most through workings until 2007, often working in pairs. 8 ABe 4/6 51-58 are owned by FART, 4 ABe 4/6 61–64 by SSIF.

Nine articulated railcars from 1959–1968, three-element ABe 8/8 21-24 and two-element ABe or ABDe 6/6 31-35 cannot work in MU but can pull a trailer or two (101...111 and 201 from 1923, 120-123 from 1964, 130 from 1948).

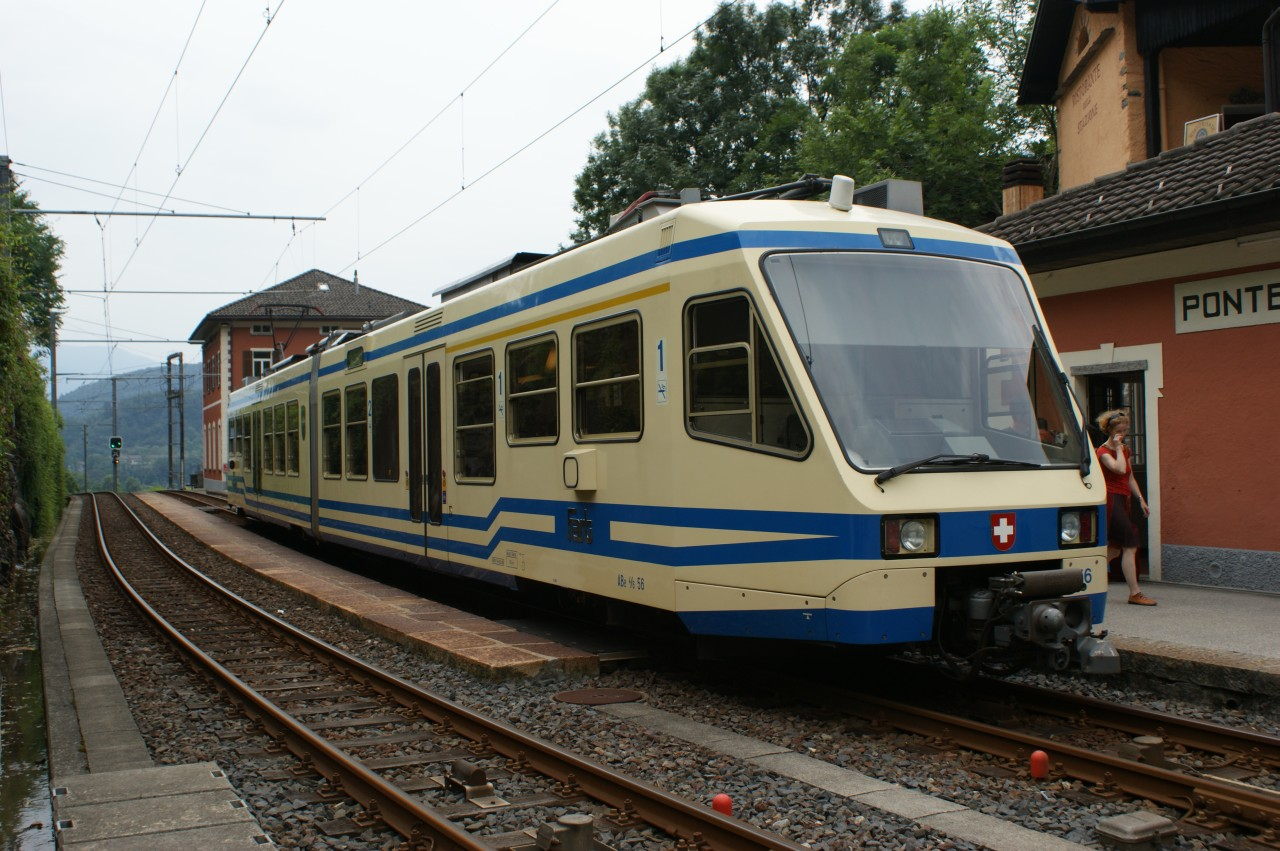
ABe 4/6 56 multiple unit at Ponte Brolla station

2004 SSIF ordered three three-car panoramic multiple units from the Officine Ferroviaire Veronesi and Škoda Works. Soon the order was changed to three four-car trains. Delivery took place in 2007.

- Driving motor, Domodossola direction: ABe 4/4 Pp 81, 83, 85
- Driving motor, Locarno direction: Be 4/4 Pp 82, 84, 86
- Non-driving motor: Be 4/4 Pi 87, 88, 89
- Trailer: Rimorchiata P 810, 811, 812

Classifications ABe and Be don't match with classes available in every vehicle. In July 2008 the following consists were working:

- 85 - 812 - 89 - 86 1st class at the Locarno end (whole coach 86)
- 83 - 87 - 810 - 82 1st class at the Domodossola end (coach 83)
- 81 - 88 - 811 - 84 1st class at both ends (end compartment of coaches 81 and 84)

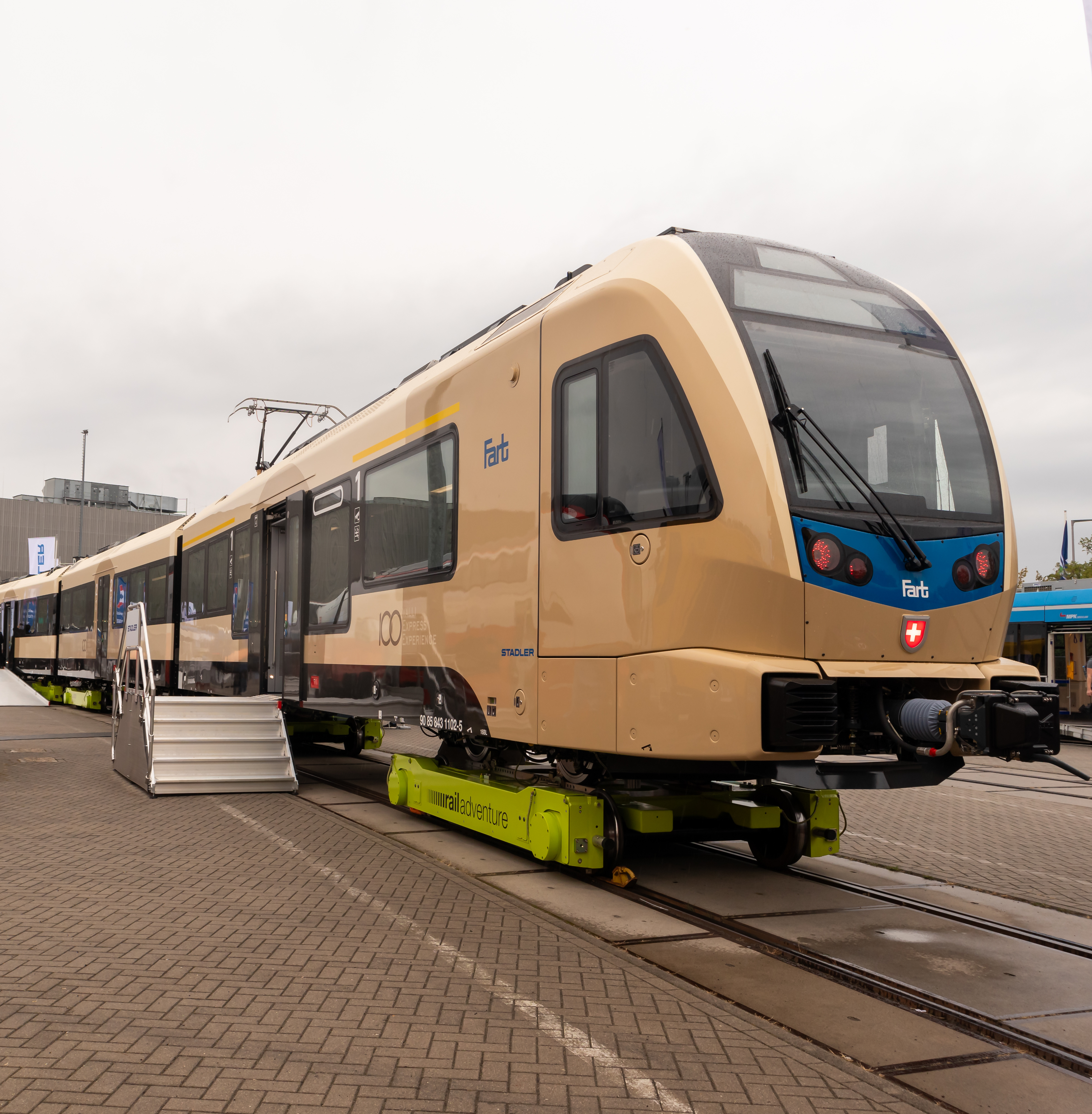
Stadler low-floor trains for the FART at InnoTrans 2024

Off-season, these consists may be reduced to three vehicles. As a replacement, SSIF had ABe 8/8 24 fitted with a new cabody, looking very similar to the new trains. However, number of seats is much smaller than in a new train, thus it must be followed by an ABe 4/6 to allow transporting all passengers.

=== History ===
A formal request for the licensing of a rail network was made by the mayor of Locarno, Francesco Balli, in 1898, but although construction of the Centovalli Railway was begun in May 1913, the collapse of the financing bank later that year, together with the intervention of the First World War meant that construction was not resumed until August 1921, with the line being constructed from each end and meeting on 27 March 1923 and public service being inaugurated on 25 November 1923. On 12 November 1918 Italy and Switzerland had signed a contract about the construction of a narrow gauge railway, Locarno - Domodossola. This contract fixed the cross acceptance of Italian vehicles in Switzerland and vice versa without needing a second approval.

== See also ==
- Transport in Switzerland
- List of bus operating companies in Switzerland
