= Barbara Muralto =

16th-century Protestant refugee

- Born: c. 1508; Locarno, Old Swiss Confederacy
- Died: 19 December 1574 or later Probably Zurich, Old Swiss Confederacy
- Other names: Barbara Muralt, Barbara Muralta, Barbara von Muralt
- Known for: Participation in a theological dispute, religious refugee
- Spouse: Giovanni Muralto
- Children: 8 (six daughters, two sons)

Barbara Muralto (c. 1508 – after 19 December 1574), also known as Barbara Muralt, was a member of an elite ruling family in Locarno, a participant in a theological dispute, and a religious refugee. Born into the noble Muralto family, she became a prominent figure in the Protestant community of Locarno during the Reformation and was later forced into exile for her religious beliefs.

== Early life and family ==
Barbara, born Muralto, married the physician-surgeon Giovanni Muralto, with whom she had eight children (six daughters and two sons) between approximately 1530 and 1550. The Muralto family, of Lombard origin, were nobles and part of the Capitanei di Locarno. After 1535, certain members of the lineage converted to the Reformation and, together with other families from Locarno as well as exiles from Milan and Piedmont, founded a Protestant community. This community was initially led by Giovanni Beccaria, then by Taddeo Duno and Martino Muralto, a cousin of Giovanni Muralto who had also converted.

While the group initially benefited from a degree of tolerance, its activities gradually became subject to increasing restrictions. In 1550, the Diet of Baden reaffirmed the article of the second national peace of 1531 that prohibited the creation of Reformed communities in the common bailiwicks of the twelve cantons. In March 1554, all residents of Locarno were forced to confess and take communion according to the Catholic rite, and those who had publicly professed the Reformed faith were required to abjure or face exile.

== The theological dispute ==
The papal nuncio and Bishop of Terracina Ottaviano Della Rovere (or Raverta), charged with managing the situation locally, invited several Dominicans in January 1555 to preach in the region in an attempt to bring the Reformed believers back to the Catholic faith. Following a sermon on transubstantiation, Lucia née Orelli, wife of Francesco Bellò, already known to the authorities as a teacher and suspected of teaching Protestant doctrine, requested a confrontation with the nuncio on the subject based on the Scriptures. Multiple sources agree that she was then summoned by Della Rovere, to whose residence she went accompanied by Barbara Muralto, Caterina Appiani, Caterina and Elisabetta Rosalini, and Chiara Toma. Before him, the women reaffirmed their convictions.

According to judicial documents, for these statements Barbara Muralto, Lucia Bellò and Caterina Appiani were sentenced to a fine of 50 crowns and their property was confiscated. After nearly two years of negotiations—during which they were supported by petitions from the Protestant community of Locarno, in exile since March 1555—and thanks to the intervention of prominent figures including the reformer Heinrich Bullinger, the serious charges of blasphemy were withdrawn in the absence of witnesses, and the financial penalties were reduced: Barbara Muralto was sentenced to pay 30 crowns, and Lucia Bellò 20.

== Exile and later life ==
Following their expulsion, the Muralto family left their native town and established the Zurich and Bern branches of the Muralt family. Barbara Muralto took refuge in Zurich with the other members of her family. They initially lived with the Engelhard family, notably Heinrich Engelhard, who were close associates of Bullinger. Giovanni Muralto and his two sons were granted citizenship of Zurich in 1566, evidence of the successful integration of their lineage into their adopted city.

== Historical significance ==
The scarcity of contemporary documents makes it difficult to clearly distinguish historical facts from later accounts, which developed from the 17th century onward and in which Barbara Muralto's role was amplified. Her trajectory, among others, is nevertheless exemplary of the role played by women during the Reformation: an active position, but poorly documented in historical sources and valorized only afterward by Protestant memory. The exile of the people of Locarno in 1555 profoundly marked Swiss Reformed identity, transforming its protagonists, ready to renounce their property and their security, into models of faith and sacrifice. In this context, Barbara Muralto's public stance before the nuncio Della Rovere, later accentuated by tradition and iconography, nourished a collective memory centered on fidelity, dignity, and religious resistance—values that continued to shape the cultural and, in part, historical representations of the Reformation.

== See also ==
- Muralto family

== Bibliography ==
- Meyer, Ferdinand (1836). Die evangelische Gemeinde in Locarno, ihre Auswanderung nach Zürich und ihre weitern Schicksale. Ein Beitrag zur Geschichte der Schweiz im sechszehnten Jahrhundert.
- Meyer, Ferdinand (2005). La comunità riformata di Locarno e il suo esilio a Zurigo nel XVI secolo, edited and translated by Brigitte Schwarz (original German edition 1836).
- Deschwanden, Karl, ed. (1886). Die Eidgenössischen Abschiede aus dem Zeitraume von 1549 bis 1555, pp. 1108–1109 (Amtliche Sammlung der ältern Eidgenössischen Abschiede, 4 I E).
