= Galeazzo Muralto =

Swiss Catholic priest (d. 1557)

Personal life
- Died: 1557 Locarno
- Parent(s): Battista Muralto; Jacobina de Bossis
- Occupation: Canon, Archpriest

Religious life
- Religion: Roman Catholic

Galeazzo Muralto (first mentioned 1491 – 1557) was a Catholic priest and archpriest of Locarno who opposed the spread of the Reformation in Ticino during the 16th century.

== Early life and ecclesiastical career ==
Galeazzo Muralto was the son of Battista Muralto and Jacobina de Bossis. He was the youngest of three brothers and was still a minor when his father died in 1491. In 1505, he became a canon of the collegiate church of Saint-Victor in Muralto, and was first cited as a priest in 1512.

== Role as archpriest ==
Muralto was elected archpriest by the canons and the corporations of Locarno, and was confirmed in this function by Pope Clement VII on 30 June 1528. In this capacity, he firmly opposed the spread of the Reformation in Ticino. On 5 August 1549, he participated in the theological disputation of Locarno against the reformers Giovanni Beccaria, Taddeo Duno, and Lodovico Ronco.

== See also ==
- Muralto family

== Bibliography ==
- K. Meyer, Die Capitanei von Locarno im Mittelalter, 1916, p. 338
- Helvetia Sacra, II/1, p. 114
