= Caspar Muralt =

Swiss merchant (1627–1718)

- Born: 26 December 1627; Zurich, Old Swiss Confederacy
- Died: 7 December 1718 (aged 90); Zurich, Old Swiss Confederacy
- Occupation: Merchant
- Known for: Silk trade, political leadership
- Spouse: Dorothea Wolf (m. 1651)
- Parent: Johannes Muralt
- Relatives: Johann Anton Muralt (uncle)

Caspar Muralt (26 December 1627 – 7 December 1718) was a Swiss merchant and political figure from Zurich. He successfully managed a silk manufacturing company founded by his father and became the first member of the Muralt family to serve on Zurich's Small Council.

== Early life and family ==
Caspar Muralt was born on 26 December 1627 in Zurich, the son of Johannes Muralt and nephew of Johann Anton Muralt. He was part of a family of refugees from Locarno who had established themselves in Zurich. In 1651, he married Dorothea Wolf, daughter of Hans Rudolf Wolf, who served as provost of the Safran guild.

== Business career ==
Muralt took over the direction of the silk manufacturing company founded by his father and managed it with considerable success. The enterprise became an important economic venture in Zurich during the 17th century.

== Political career ==
Muralt represented the Safran guild in Zurich's Small Council beginning in 1685. He served as director of convents from 1689. As the first Muralt to gain a seat on the Small Council, he represented the social advancement of this family of Locarno refugees who played a significant economic role in Zurich. In 1662, he co-founded the Commercial Directorate (Directoire commercial).

== Death ==
Muralt died in Zurich on 7 December 1718, at the age of 90.

== See also ==
- Muralto family

== Bibliography ==
- Peyer, H.C. Die Seidenfirma Muralt an der Sihl, 1966
