= Johannes Muralt (1577) =

16th-century Swiss silk manufacturer

- Born: 18 September 1577; Zurich, Old Swiss Confederacy
- Died: 2 February 1645 (aged 67); Zurich, Old Swiss Confederacy
- Occupations: Silk manufacturer, merchant
- Spouse: Elisabeth Thoma
- Parent(s): Franz Muralt (father); Catharina von Orelli (mother)
- Relatives: Johann Anton Muralt (brother); Giovanni Muralto (grandfather)

Johannes Muralt (18 September 1577 – 2 February 1645) was a Swiss silk manufacturer and merchant from Zurich. He was the first member of the Muralt family to engage in silk manufacturing and founded the silk factory Muralt an der Sihl.

== Life and career ==
Muralt was born on 18 September 1577 in Zurich to Franz Muralt, a physician, and Catharina von Orelli. He was the brother of Johann Anton Muralt and grandson of Giovanni Muralto. He married Elisabeth Thoma, daughter of Cornelius Thoma, a velvet weaver.

Like all the Locarno refugees in Zurich, Muralt initially engaged primarily in textile trade with Lombardy. He was the first in his family to venture into manufacturing between 1606 and 1611, establishing the silk factory Muralt an der Sihl. At his Zurich facility, he produced schappe and floss silk with Lombard workers. After 1636, he achieved commercial success alongside his brother.

== See also ==
- Muralto family

== Bibliography ==
- Peyer, H.C. Die Seidenfirma Muralt an der Sihl, 1966
