= Capitanei di Locarno =

Noble families of Locarno

The Capitanei di Locarno were noble families of Locarno in Switzerland who held the title of Capitanei from the 12th century until the end of the Old Swiss Confederacy in 1798.

== Origins and imperial privilege ==
The title of Capitanei attributed to noble families of Locarno first appears in a diploma (market privilege) of Emperor Frederick I, dating from 1164. This title, granted in principle only to vassals of the king, was given to the nobles of Locarno, who were only rear-vassals, as an exception. The Capitanei probably descended from the Lombard nobles Da Besozzo, from the County of Seprio, to whom the schismatic Bishop of Como, Landolfo da Carcano, had enfeoffed the region of Locarno around the year 1000.

== Administrative role and powers ==
The Capitanei were responsible for the administration of ecclesiastical property in the pieve; they enjoyed immunity and coercive power, but were not owners of the territory which belonged, with the exception of ecclesiastical and royal property, to local communities. As they were deprived of sovereign power, their political weight was limited; they nevertheless played an important role in the 13th and 14th centuries, during the struggles between Guelphs and Ghibellines and during the wars between Como and Milan. Residing mainly in Ascona, Locarno and Muralto, the Capitanei did not belong to any community; their families (Orelli, Rastelli, Rusconi, Magoria, Gnosca, Della Rocca, Muralto and Duni) constituted a political, fiscal and commercial entity, called a university or corporation of nobles, separate from the rest of the population.

== Economic power ==
Their economic power derived from the regalia they possessed over the entire territory of the parish (tolls, tithes, alpine rights, grazing rights, fishing rights, market rights, hunting rights, banalités, etc.) and from the possession of numerous landed properties (estates, fields, woods, pastures, alpine pastures). Until the mid-16th century, the Capitanei exercised direct control over the election of community representatives to the General Council of the parish; subsequently, they could only appoint their own representatives. Over the centuries, they ceded part of their regalia to the communities and especially to the corporation of burghers of Locarno.

== Decline and dissolution ==
After 1342, when the region of Locarno was occupied by the Visconti, the political and economic role of the Capitanei diminished greatly; their corporation nevertheless managed to maintain, without many changes, numerous privileges until 1798. Its members became burghers of Locarno in 1803.

== Bibliography ==
- Meyer, K. (1916). Die Capitanei von Locarno im Mittelalter.
- Wielich, G. (1970). Das Locarnese im Altertum und Mittelalter.
