= Pierino Ambrosoli Foundation =

Swiss foundation

The Pierino Ambrosoli Foundation was founded on May 10, 1990 in Zurich. It is dedicated to Daniela Ambrosoli’s father, Pierino Ambrosoli, a successful Italian/Swiss industrialist and her mother, Sonja Bragowa, a former dancer in the 1920s.

The foundation is not due to the testamentary will of Pierino Ambrosoli. Rather, it arose by the desire of Daniela Ambrosoli, who decided to use a substantial portion of her inherited fortune from the father, to support young artists on their way to the stage.

== Purpose ==
The Pierino Ambrosoli Foundation supports young talented dancers and musicians on their way to the stage for the promotion of dance and music at a professional level through scholarships all over the world at recognized vocational institutions. Ballet school graduates can obtain a scholarship as a trainee at theatres and dance companies. The foundation collaborates with other organizations, schools and theatres. A careful investigation of the talent and the need for a scholarship is a prerequisite for the scholarship grants.

On request, the foundation offers also technical information and advice. The Pierino Ambrosoli Foundation is member of the International Organization for the Transition of Professional Dancers. Daniela Ambrosoli has been among others member of the patronage committee of the Prix de Lausanne, the Swiss Dance Prize and she is a member of the board Montecinemaverità Foundation.

== Organisation ==
The Pierino Ambrosoli Foundation is a private non-profit foundation. Today it consists of a board of trustees, the founder and president Daniela Ambrosoli as well as a professional advisory board for the areas of music and dance.

== Auditions ==
The Pierino Ambrosoli Foundation organizes auditions:

- 1993 Audition Pierino Ambrosoli Foundation in Zurich
- 2000-2010 Swiss Audition for the Rotterdam Dance Academy, NL in Bern

== Successful careers ==
Since 1990 over 250 scholarships have been awarded worldwide, for students from 20 different countries by the foundation. Some of the most successful scholarship holders of the Pierino Ambrosoli Foundation should be mentioned here, such as:

=== Classical Dance ===
First Soloists/Principals

- John Lam
- Giada Rossi
- Matias Oberlin
- Dominic Antonucci, Schulleiter Birmingham Royal Ballet
- Anna Laudere, Direktor des Hamburger Balletts John Neumeier
- David Makhateli, Schulleiter des Royal Ballet London
- Diana Martinez Morales, Principal Stuttgarter Ballett
- Shintaro Oue, Principal Hamburg Ballet John Neumeier, Nederlands Dans Theater und Choreograf
- Valentina Scaglia, Direktorin Hamburg Ballet John Neumeier, Niederländisch Im Theater
- Ivan Urban, Schulleiter des Hamburger Balletts John Neumeier
- Ilana Werner, Bayerisches Staatsballett

Soloists

- Koio Yamamoto
- Sarah Kora Dayanova, Subjekt Ballett der Opéra National de Paris
- Zaloa Fabbrini,
- John Lam,
- Giada Rossi, Compañía Nacional de Danza (Madrid)
- Lucia Solari, Hamburg Ballett John Neumeier, Northern Ballet
- Ljupka Stamenovsky, Nationaltheater Belgrad

=== Contemporary Dance ===
- Michele Mastroianni, solist Companyia Gelabert-Azzopardi, Barcelona, dancer, choreographer and director of the *Michele Mastroianni Company, Italy
- Eugénie Rébétez, freie Tänzerin und Choreografin, Schweiz
- Iratxe Ansa, Tänzer und Choreograf, Spanien
- Morgan Belenguer, Performer, Tänzer und Choreograf, Berlin
- Jochen Heckmann, director and choreographer Ballet Theater Augsburg, Artistic Director HF Bühnentanz Zürich
- Jasmine Morand, Gründerin, Tänzerin und Choreografin Company prototype-status

== Competitions ==
The Pierino Ambrosoli Foundation is active in the field of dance competitions:

- Prix de Lausanne, Prix Meilleurs Suisse, Switzerland, 1991–2002
- Prix de Lausanne, Prix Espoir, Switzerland, 2000

== Symposium ==
The Pierino Ambrosoli Foundation was participating and supporting the International Organization for the Transition of Professional Dancers:

- 1995 First International Symposium Lausanne, Switzerland (May 5–7, 1995) - The Dancer in Transition: Facing the limits, the realities and solutions.
- 1998 Second International Symposium The Hague, Netherlands (February 6–8, 1998) - The Dancer of the XXI Century, Education for Transition in a Changing World.
- 1999 International dance conference Not Just Any Body, Toronto/ Den Haag.

== Gallery ==
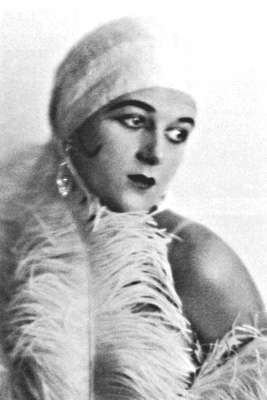
Sonja Bragowa (1930)

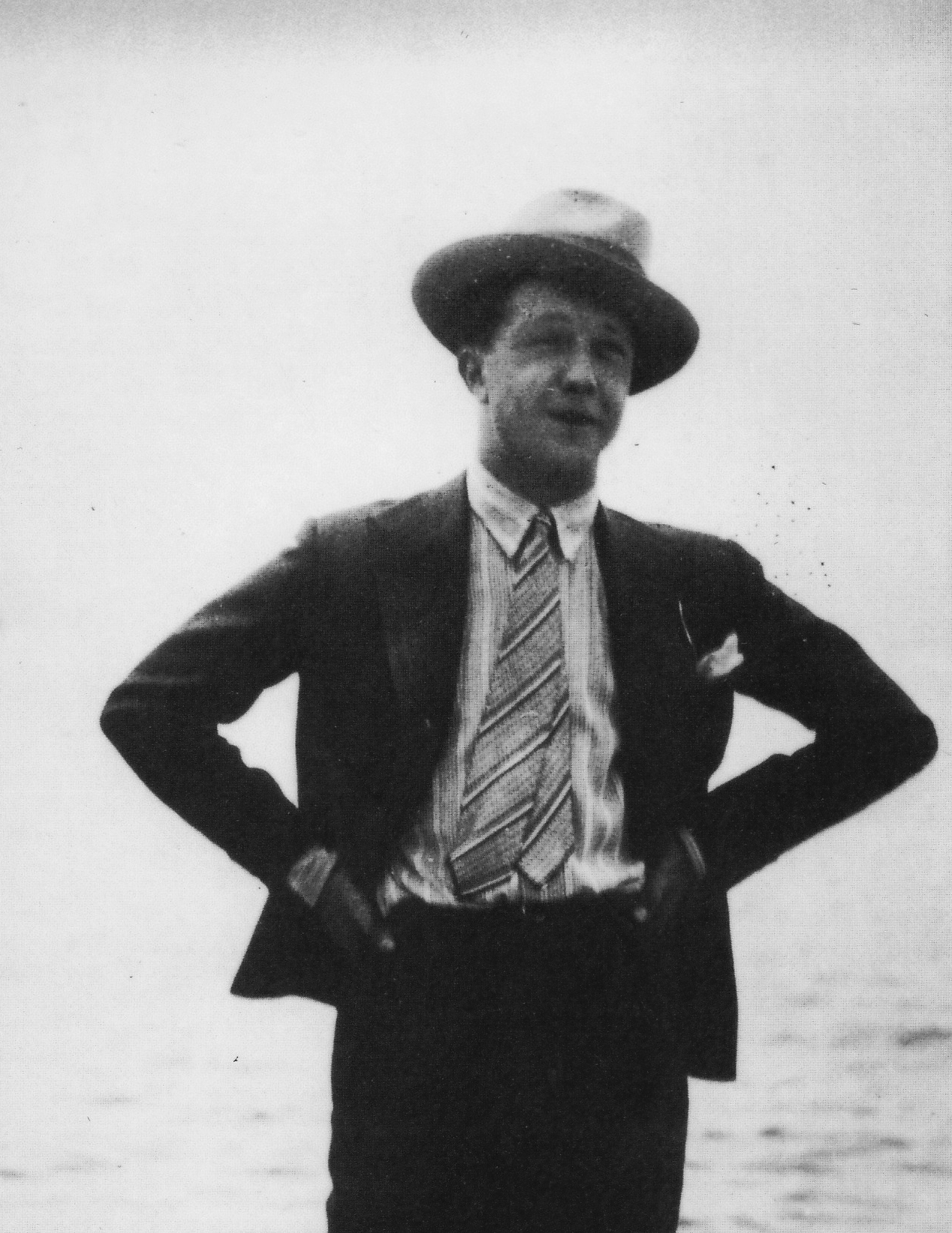
Pierino Ambrosoli - 1923
