= Sonja Bragowa =

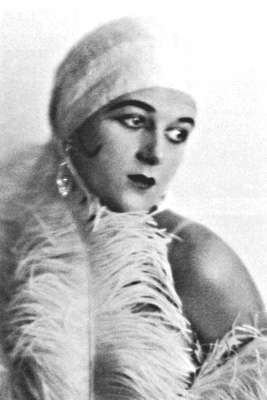
Sonja Bragowa, 1930

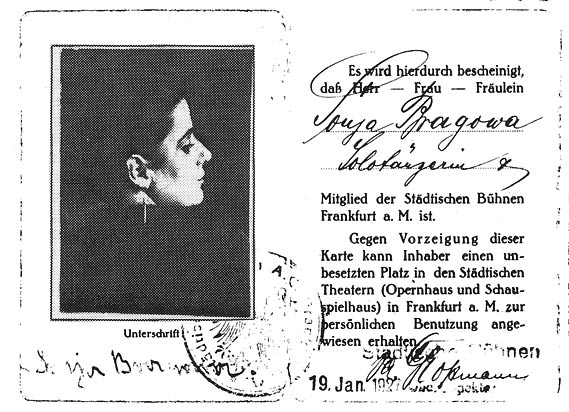
Sonja Bragowa Soloist Dancer. Membership's Card of Städtischen Bühnen Frankfurt a. Main

Sonja Bragowa (Stuttgart, August 3, 1903 – Zürich, March 16, 1998), born Gertrud Elsa Knieser, was a German expressionist dancer, revue dancer and solo dancer.

== Origin ==
Her father Oskar, doctor in theology and philosophy, was headmaster of the municipal secondary school, and her mother Berthe Julie, born Bräuchle, was a housewife. Gertrud attended the conservatory in Stuttgart, but interrupted her studies to devote herself to her passion: dance. At the age of 16 she left home. It is not clear how she could manage to earn her living over the years, but she was soon dancing for the regional theatre of Württemberg (Württembergisches Landestheater).

== Career ==
As chance would have it, one of the main representatives of modern dance, Mary Wigman, who had her dance school in Dresden, was looking for a dancer to join her company. After two intensive years with the dance group of Wigman, Gertrud started as a soloist on international stages as Sonja Bragowa. Later on she decided on another genre: the big revue, which made headlines in those days – a musical festival with extravagant costumes. She performed among others in the "Wintergarten" in the programme of Teddy Stauffer, which was on the schedule for a whole year in the famous Berlin Theatre. Together with Teddy Stauffer she went on a major tour in Italy, where she also had the opportunity to work with Wanda Osiris, the most popular Italian actress and showgirl of the times. That is how the name Sonja Bragowa, former student of Mary Wigman, made its appearance on the programme of international stages and in newspaper reviews. Actually Sonja Bragowa had planned to go back to Germany and start a dance school together with a colleague. However, during a guest performance in Locarno (Ticino, Switzerland) she met the Swiss entrepreneur Pierino Ambrosoli, whom she married in 1932. She renounced her career as a dancer for the benefit of her marriage and family, and was since then known as Sonja Ambrosoli. The couple settled in Ascona, where their daughter Daniela was born. Daniela Ambrosoli founded the Pierino Ambrosoli Foundation in 1990 in Zurich in memory of her parents.

== Literature ==
• Ursina Fasani, Veronica Provenzale, Michela Zucconi-Poncini: Il cimitero comunale di Ascona: storia e arte di uno spazio identitario, Municipal Museum of Modern Art Ascona 2015, S. 84–86.
• Cristina Owens-Foglia: The Pierino Ambrosoli Foundation, Locarno 1992.
