= Johann Anton Muralt =

Swiss silk ribbon manufacturer (1581–1667)

- Born: 17 May 1581; Zurich, Old Swiss Confederacy
- Died: 7 February 1667 (aged 85); Zurich, Old Swiss Confederacy
- Occupations: Merchant, silk ribbon manufacturer
- Relatives: Johannes Muralt (brother); Giovanni Muralto (grandfather)

Johann Anton Muralt (17 May 1581 – 7 February 1667) was a Swiss merchant and silk ribbon manufacturer from Zurich. He transformed his family's business into one of the city's most important enterprises, distinguished by exemplary accounting practices.

== Biography ==
Muralt was born on 17 May 1581 in Zurich, the son of Franz Muralt, a physician, and Catharina von Orelli. His brother was Johannes Muralt, and his grandfather was Giovanni Muralto. He remained unmarried throughout his life.

Muralt apprenticed as a cloth shearer before becoming involved in the silk ribbon trade. In 1613, he became a business partner with his brother, initially focusing on the sale of silk products before increasingly dedicating himself to their manufacture. He took over leadership of the company in 1645 and became its principal partner in 1663, developing it into one of Zurich's most important businesses, notable for its exemplary bookkeeping.

== See also ==
- Muralto family

== Bibliography ==
- H.C. Peyer, Die Seidenfirma Muralt an der Sihl, 1966
