= Muralto family =

Noble family from Locarno

Muralt / Muralto von Muralt / de Muralt
- Country: Switzerland
- Current region: Locarno, Zürich, Bern
- Etymology: Likely from a castle in Muralto
- Origin: Lombardy
- Founded: 12th century
- Cadet branches: Zürich branch, Bern branch

The Muralt (also Muralto or von Muralt or de Muralt) is a noble family of Lombard origin that established itself in Locarno in the 12th century and later developed prominent branches in Zürich and Bern following the Protestant Reformation.

== Origins and medieval period ==
The Muralto family was documented in Locarno from the 12th century and belonged to the Capitanei di Locarno. The family also had branches in Como, Milan, and Balerna. The family name likely derives from a castle located in Muralto that was granted as a fief by the bishop of Como to Gaffo de Muralto and Beltramo in 1191 or 1192; this castle was destroyed around 1380.

The Muralto held influential positions in the administration of the pieve of Locarno, where they possessed a portion of the castle of Saints Abonde and Blaise and part of the Visconti castle in Locarno. The family owned extensive lands in the Mendrisiotto, Capriasca, and Valtellina.

== Conflict and exile ==
Between 1447 and 1449, members of the Muralto family opposed the authority of Count Franchino Rusca. After the departure of the Milanese, those who had participated in the revolt were exiled and sought refuge in Italy. Some of these exiles founded a branch in Como that became extinct in the 16th century; this branch produced Francesco Muralto, author of a chronicle of Como covering the period 1492–1520.

== Religious division and emigration ==
While some family members remained Catholic, including Galeazzo Muralto, who served as archpriest of San Vittore in Muralto from 1528 to 1557, others embraced Protestantism. Following the Diet of Baden's 1554 decision requiring Protestants in Locarno to either renounce their faith or leave the city, Protestant members of the family, including Martino Muralto, were forced into exile in 1555.

== Zürich branch ==
The Protestant branch in Zürich traces its origins to Johannes Muralt, a physician who became a bourgeois of Zürich in 1566, along with his wife Barbara Muralto. Their grandson, also named Johannes, founded the silk manufacturing firm Muralt an der Sihl. During the 17th century, this enterprise developed into a prosperous business organized according to the Verlagssystem (putting-out system), with commercial connections extending to northern Italy and Flanders.

The family's economic success led to political and social advancement. In 1651, Caspar Muralt married the daughter of Hans Rudolf Wolf, master of the Saffron Guild. Caspar became the first member of the family to enter Zürich's Grand Council in 1680, followed by his election to the Small Council in 1685. Between then and 1798, four additional family members served on the Small Council. The Zürich branch adopted the noble particle "von" around 1807.

== Bern branch ==
The Bern branch descends from Martino Muralto, one of the leaders of the Reformed community in Locarno who emigrated to Zürich in 1555. His son, Hans Ludwig (1546–1606), trained as a surgeon in Bern. In 1567, he married Maria, daughter of Avoyer Beat Ludwig von Mülinen, who had been his patient. Hans Ludwig was granted Bern citizenship in 1570.

The family achieved political prominence in Bern, with the first Muralt entering the Grand Council in 1593. From 1684 to 1798, members of the family served continuously on Bern's Small Council. During the 18th century, the Muralt family ranked among the second-highest class (edelfest) of Bern's bourgeoisie. They acquired property and rights throughout the Canton of Bern and the Pays de Vaud, and family members frequently served in foreign military service.

== Later developments ==
Both the Zürich and Bern branches maintained representation in politics and the sciences during the 19th and 20th centuries. Despite their exile and establishment in German-speaking Switzerland, the family maintained connections with Ticino. In 1674, they were admitted to the Corporation of Nobles of Locarno, and in 1939, they regained citizenship rights in the city.

== Bibliography ==
- Schulthess, H. (1944). Bilder aus der Vergangenheit der Familie von Muralt in Zürich.
- Peyer, H.C. (1966). Die Seidenfirma Muralt an der Sihl.
- von Muralt, L.; Morf, H. (1976). Stammtafeln der Familie von Muralt in Zürich (2nd ed.).
- von Moos, M. (1994). Bibliographie généalogique suisse, Vol. 1, pp. 365–366 (2nd ed.).
- Meyer, K. (1916). Die Capitanei von Locarno im Mittelalter.
- Huber, R. (2005). "Gli archivi dei Muralto, degli Orelli e della Corporazione dei Nobili di Locarno". Bollettino della Società storica locarnese, pp. 49–53.
