= Ascona =

- Municipality
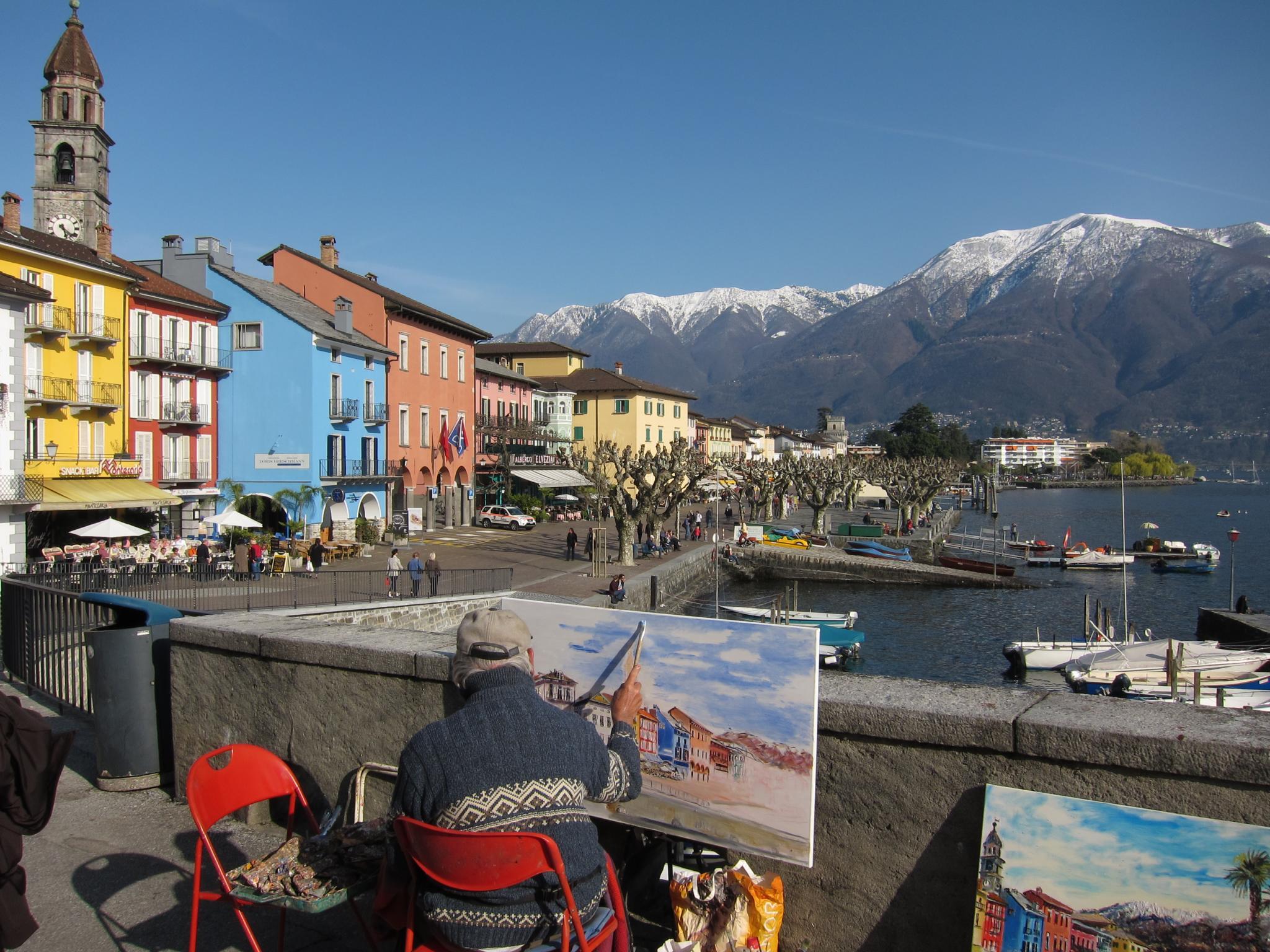

- Flag Coat of arms
- Location of Ascona
- Location within Switzerland Location within Canton of Ticino
- Coordinates: 46.155°N 8.768°E
- Country: Switzerland
- Canton: Ticino
- District: Locarno

Government
  - Mayor: Sindaco; Luca Pissoglio (FDP) (as of 2012)

Area
  - Total: 4.97 km^{2} (1.92 sq mi)
- Elevation: 196 m (643 ft)

Population (December 2002)
  - Total: 5,057
  - Density: 1,020/km^{2} (2,640/sq mi)
- Time zone: UTC+01:00 (CET)
  - Summer (DST): UTC+02:00 (CEST)
- Postal code: 6612
- SFOS number: 5091
- ISO 3166 code: CH-TI
- Surrounded by: Brissago, Gambarogno, Intragna, Locarno, Losone, Ronco sopra Ascona
- Website: www.ascona.ch

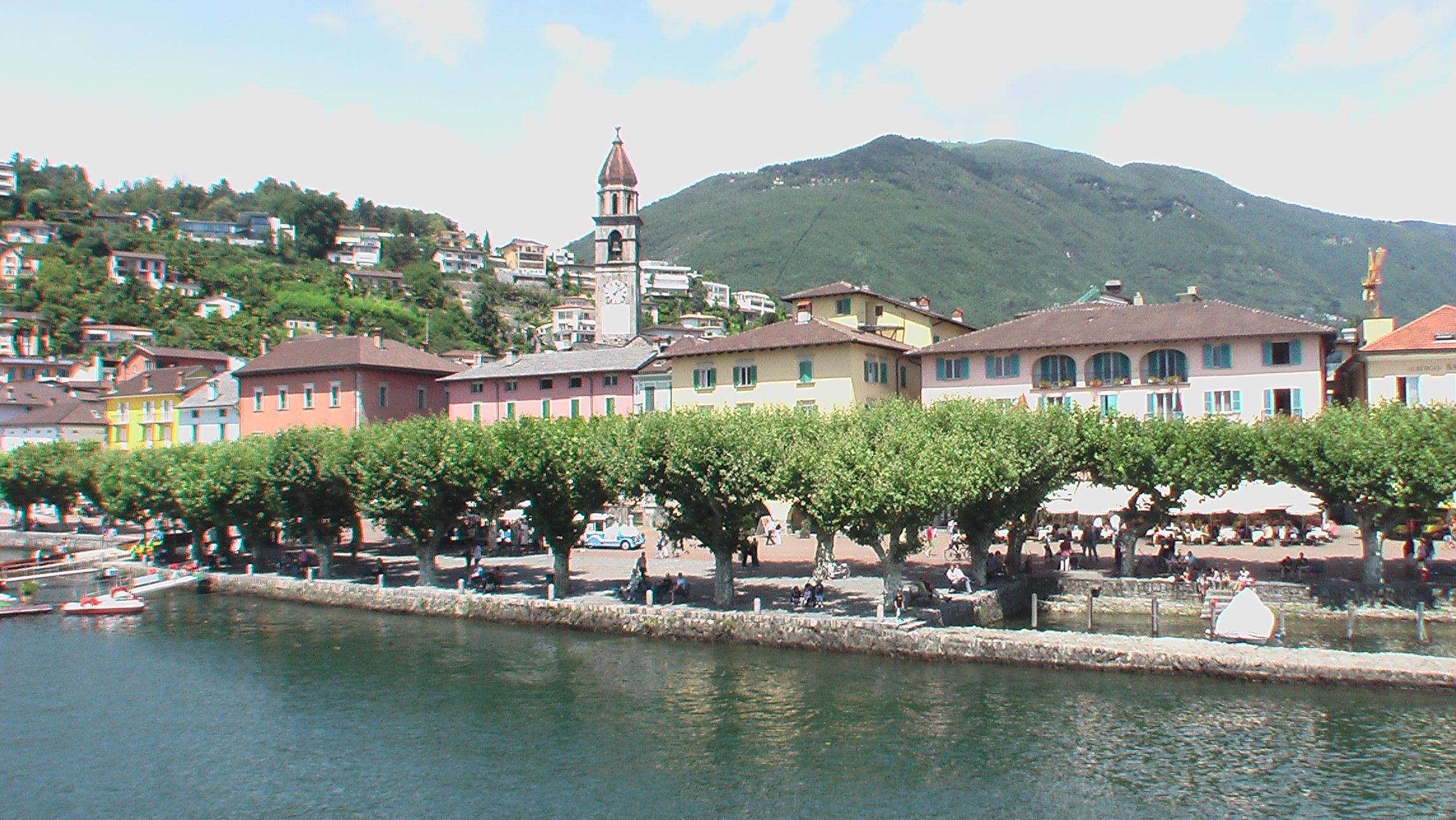
Ascona

Ascona (Ticinese: Scona [ˈʃkona]) is a municipality in the district of Locarno in the canton of Ticino in Switzerland.

It is on the shore of Lake Maggiore.

The town is a popular tourist destination and holds the yearly Ascona Jazz Festival.

== History ==
=== Prehistory ===
The oldest archaeological finds in Ascona (at S. Materno and S. Michele) go back to the beginnings of the Late Bronze Age. During the expansion of the cemetery in 1952, a necropolis was discovered at S. Materno, where 21 cremation urns were discovered. The urns were either simply buried or covered with a stone slab box. They contained cremated bones and, in some cases, bronze grave goods. Of particular interest are the bronze brooches, which are among the oldest that have been found so far in Switzerland. They also provide important evidence for the relationship of this area to the cultures of the Italian Peninsula. The grave goods have similarities with those from the final phase of the so-called Canegrate culture (named after a large necropolis in Milan). However, the materials used are those of the late Bronze Age north of the Alps. This allowed the cemetery to be dated to the period between the 12th and 10th centuries BC and points to the fact that Ascona took part in trade over the Alps through the Val Mesolcina and over Lake Maggiore with the Po Valley.

Similar objects were found by exploratory excavations in the late 1960s on the castle hill of San Michele. Both fine ceramics and coarse pottery were discovered, which suggests that this area was settled during the Late Bronze Age, even if there is no evidence of the municipal structures. Remains of walls and clay from the Balladrum hill are the only Iron Age objects found in the municipality. However, the exact age is unknown. The only item that has been conclusively identified is a single flagon from the 6th to 5th century BC.

From the Roman Empire, a necropolis with 38 tombs at the foot of the Castle of S. Materno was discovered. The equipment found near the graves points to the period in the mid-1st or 2nd century AD. The necropolis was probably associated with a villa. In 1979–80, an excavation at the church of S. Sebastiano discovered 60 early medieval graves.

=== Medieval town ===
A fortified settlement is first mentioned in 1186, as Sconae (castrum quod dicitur sconae), in 1224 as burgus de schona. The etymology of the toponym is unknown, there are several suggestions from 19th-century scholarship, all of them uncertain: from Latin scanum "alluvial sediment", from Latin ab abscondito, or from an uncertain early Romance asculà "pasture in uncultivated land". The German form of the name, Aschgunen, is recorded from the 16th century, when Locarno had come under the rule of the Old Swiss Confederacy. It is no longer in use.

In the later Middle Ages, Ascona, Ronco, and Castelletto formed a village cooperative together. In 1321 it was mentioned for the first time, and in 1369, it had its own statutes. The history of Ascona during the Middle Ages is closely linked with that of Locarno. The important role of Ascona is reflected in the designation plebis Locarni Asconaeque which it was given in 1369. It is believed that in the 6th century, the Castle of San Michele was the site of a curia (court) and the seat of a sculdascio (Lombardic for officer) of the county of Stazzona, who exercised control over the entire parish of Locarno. In 1004, the court rights were transferred from the Archbishop of Milan to the Bishop of Como. In 1189 this gave the castle of San Michele to the Duni, one of the families of the Capitanei di Locarno. Other noble families from Locarno (Da Carcano, Castelletto, Muralto) settled in Ascona. They were joined by the Griglioni family that fled the wars between the Guelphs and Ghibellines of Milan.

In the 12th and 13th centuries, the Duni enlarged their fortress (demolished in the 17th century) and the church of S. Sebastiano as well as having created a plaza around their residential home. The oldest fortification, probably, is the castle of San Materno. At its location, north of the village, there already seems to have been a Roman tower. The fort was occupied as early as the Early Middle Ages. In the 13th century, it was owned by the Orelli and Castelletto families. In the 17th century, only a part of the walls was still preserved. In the course of the 13th century, two new fortifications were built. The first was the Carcani Castle on the shore east of the Church of SS. Pietro e Paolo, and it was already demolished by the 2nd half of the 13th century. The second, was still further east, outside the inhabited area at that time. The Griglioni built a small castle to protect a port. Parts of this castle still exist and have been integrated into modern buildings.

A church is first mentioned in 1264 and was originally consecrated only as the Church of S. Peter. The Church of SS Peter and Paul is first mentioned as a parish church in 1330, and in 1332 as a collegiate church. However, no documents exist which show the separation from the mother church of San Vittore in Muralto and thus the existence of an early medieval parish. The Church of S. Maria della Misericordia was built in 1399–1442. It contains one of the most extensive late Gothic fresco cycles in Switzerland.

=== Early Modern Ascona ===
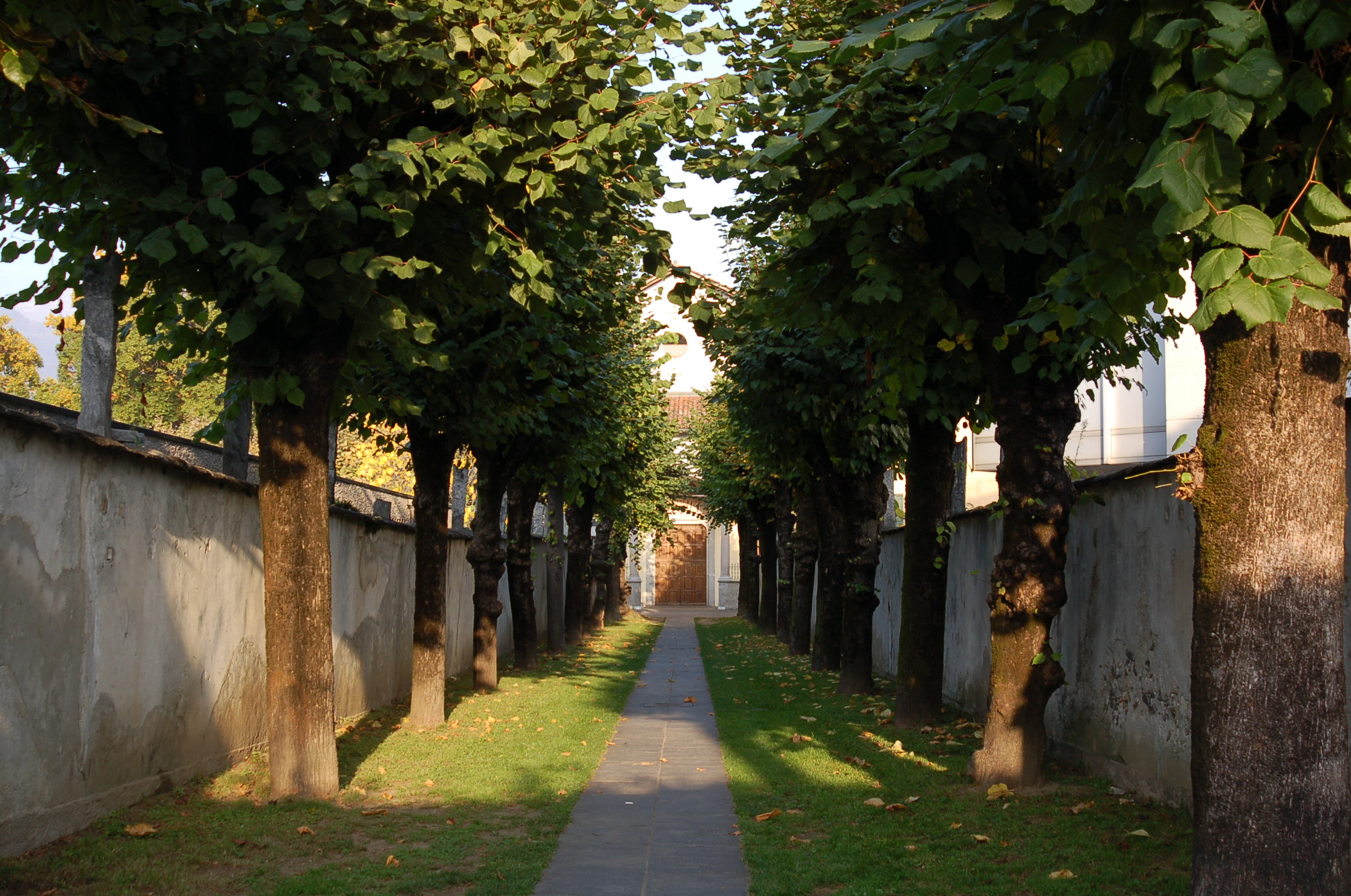
Collegio Papio grounds

In 1640-41, Ascona separated from Ronco and Castelletto. According to the statues adopted in the 14th century, Ascona was represented by three people in the Council of the parish of Locarno. Under the Swiss Confederation, it was represented with two members, alternating every two years with those of Ronco. In 1428, Filippo Maria Visconti gave the villages the market right, which was renewed by the Confederates after the conquest of Locarno in 1513.

In 1580, Bartolomeo Papio, who had become wealthy in Rome, donated 25,000 Scudi to Ascona for the construction of a seminary as long as the work could be completed within three years. In October 1584 the school was finished. After negotiations with Charles Borromeo, the Archbishop of Milan, and representatives of Pope Gregory XIII, it was decided to sell the originally planned Casa Papio and to build the Collegio Papio college next to the Church of S. Maria della Misericordia. This project ran from 1585 until 1592. In 1616, Cardinal Federico Borromeo, placed the school under the authority of the Congregation of the Oblate of Milan, which led the school until 1798.

The Church of SS Peter and Paul was enlarged in the 16th century, and in 1703, was elevated to have a provost over the church. This was followed by it being raised to have a dean in 1800. In 1617-37 the Church of Madonna della Fontana was built on the northern slopes of Monte Verità, which became a pilgrimage destination. The most remarkable profane building of this era is the Casa Serodine, a building of the 17th century, with a richly decorated facade.

=== Modern Ascona ===
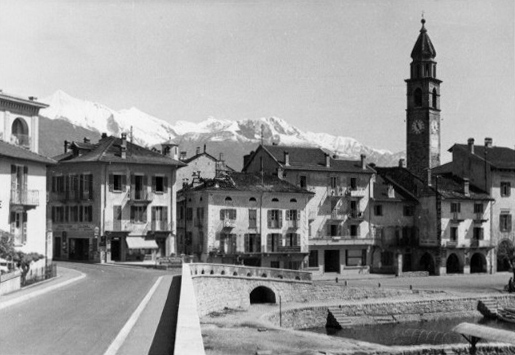
Ascona in 1932

After various changes, the Collegio Papio seminary was secularized in 1852 and then served initially as a high school. It then became a girls' school and later the Istituto Elvetico. In 1879, it returned to its original name and purpose and was placed under the Bishop of Como. In 1885 it came under the authority of the bishop of Lugano. Under the bishop of Lugano, several religious orders administered the seminary, including the Salesians (1894–1910), the Assumptionists (1910–14), and finally the Benedictines (since 1924). In the 20th century, the building was rebuilt and expanded several times (1924–27, after a fire in 1960, 1975–76, and 1992).

In the second half of the 18th century, the Church of SS Peter and Paul was extensively rebuilt. In 1859, the façade and the south side were totally redone in a Gothic Revival style. A further renovation began in 1948 but was aborted after the 18th-century vaults collapsed.

In 1798 Ascona elected to join the Helvetic Republic, and was granted a certain degree of local self-government. French troops moved into the town but were driven out, and it was then occupied by Austrian units. When the canton of Ticino was founded in 1803, Ascona became a political municipality.

Until the beginning of the 20th century, the local economy depended mostly on crops, livestock, and fisheries. A smaller, but important source of income was the emigration of builders, architects, and artists to Rome and Tuscany. The most famous Ascona artist families were the Serodine, Abbondio, Pancaldi, and Pisoni. In the 19th century, linen production and mills offered job opportunities to the locals. In the second half of the 19th century, a dynamite factory operated in Ascona, but it closed after repeated explosions in 1874.

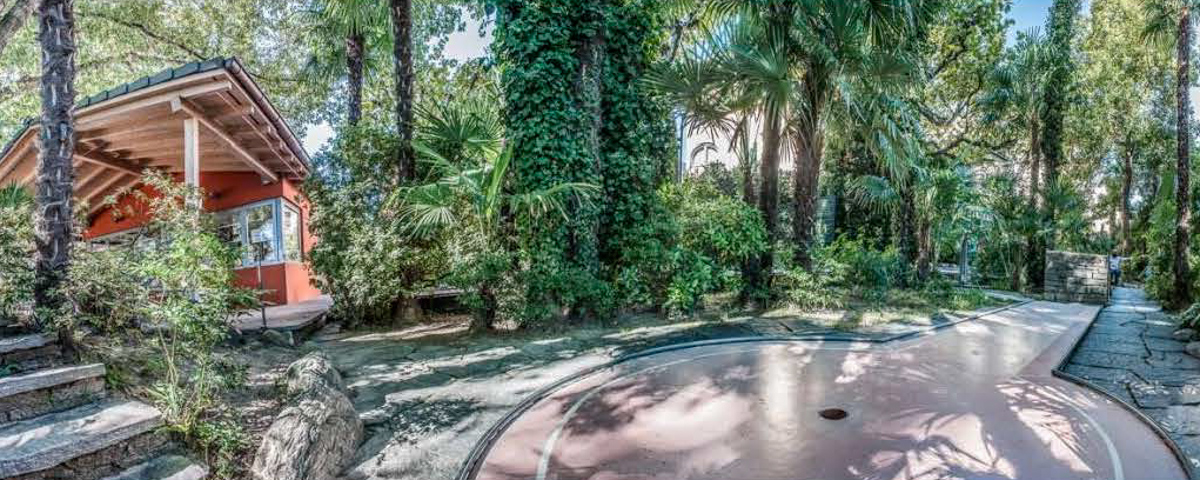
Minigolf Ascona, opened in 1954, the oldest course worldwide following the norms of Paul Bongni

In the 20th century, tourism became a major part of the local economy. Since 1970 the number of second homes has increased substantially, and at the end of the 20th century, during the summer season, around 20,000 to 25,000 visitors came to Ascona each year. Closely connected with the rise of tourism was population growth in the 1920s. In 1925 an extensive redistribution of land ownership allowed non-locals to purchase land. By 1934, the number of landowners included not only 299 Ticinesi, but 88 other Swiss, 41 German, 35 Italian, and 31 foreign nationals. The settlement area has expanded since 1960. The expansion has proceeded more and more towards the north, so that as of 2023 Locarno and Ascona form a single agglomeration. Two bridges connect Ascona with the left bank of the Maggia river. The one at Solduno, which was built 1815–16, and rebuilt in 1887 after the flood of 1868, was totally replaced in 1996. The second bridge, further into the valley, was built in 1974–80. Since 1947, Ascona has also had an airport; however, it is likely to close in the near future.

In 1945 negotiations over World War II surrender plans took place between U.S. and Nazi German representatives in Ascona.

=== Monte Verità ===
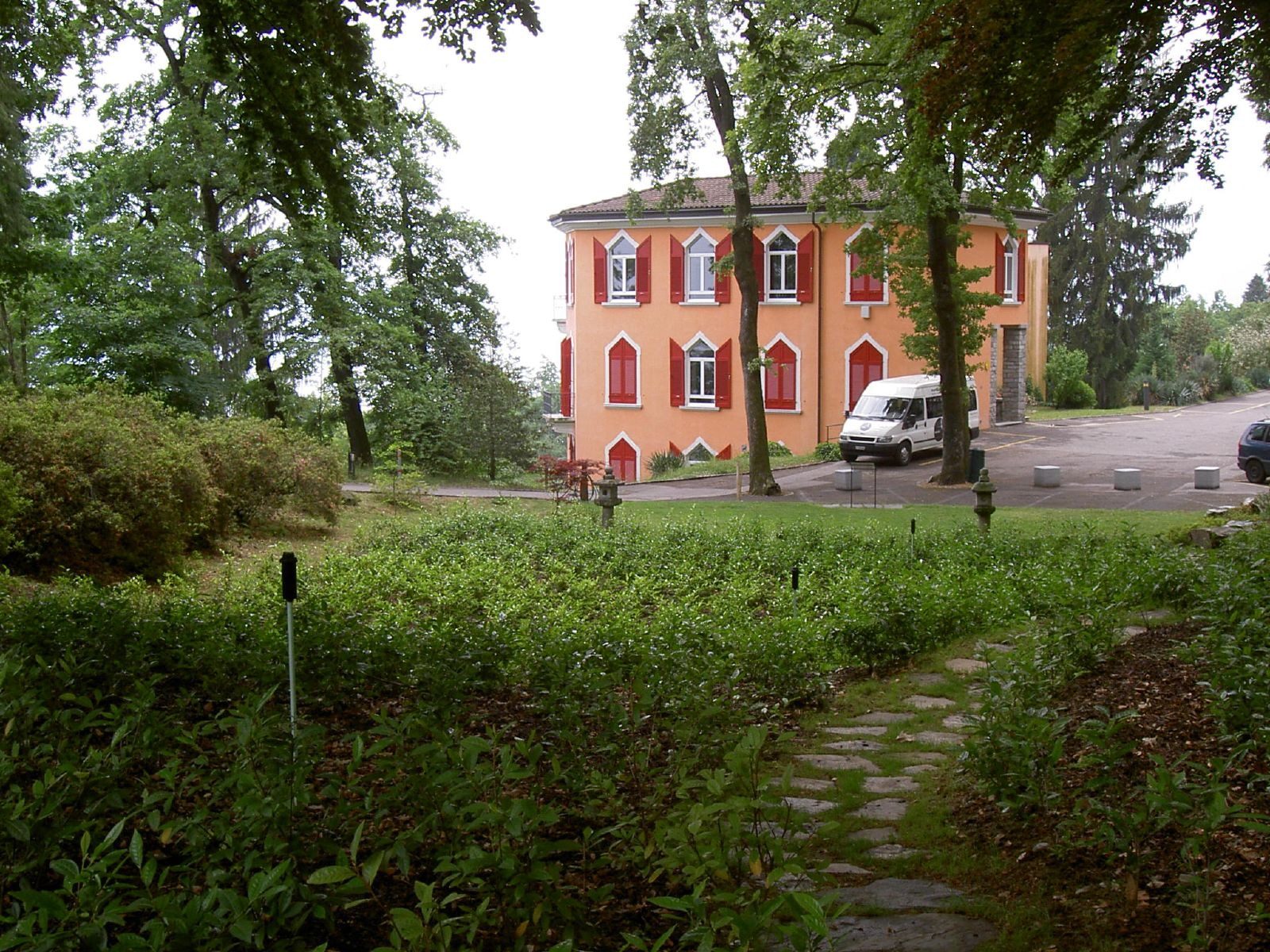
Villa Semiramis on Monte Verità, today a part of the hotel and conference complex

"Monte Verità" ("Mount Truth") was so named at the beginning of the 20th century, when a "colony" was founded by proponents of primitive socialism and anarchy on a hill formerly known as "Monescia", just to the north-west of the town of Ascona.

The colony attracted a large number of artists, anarchists, and other famous people, including Hermann Hesse, Hans Habe, Carl Jung, Erich Maria Remarque, Hugo Ball, Else Lasker-Schüler, Stefan George, Isadora Duncan, Paul Klee, Rudolf Steiner, Mary Wigman, Gyula Háy, Max Picard, Ernst Toller, Henri van de Velde, Rudolf Laban, Frieda and Else von Richthofen, Otto Gross, Erich Mühsam, Karl Wilhelm Diefenbach, and Gustav Stresemann.

== Geography ==
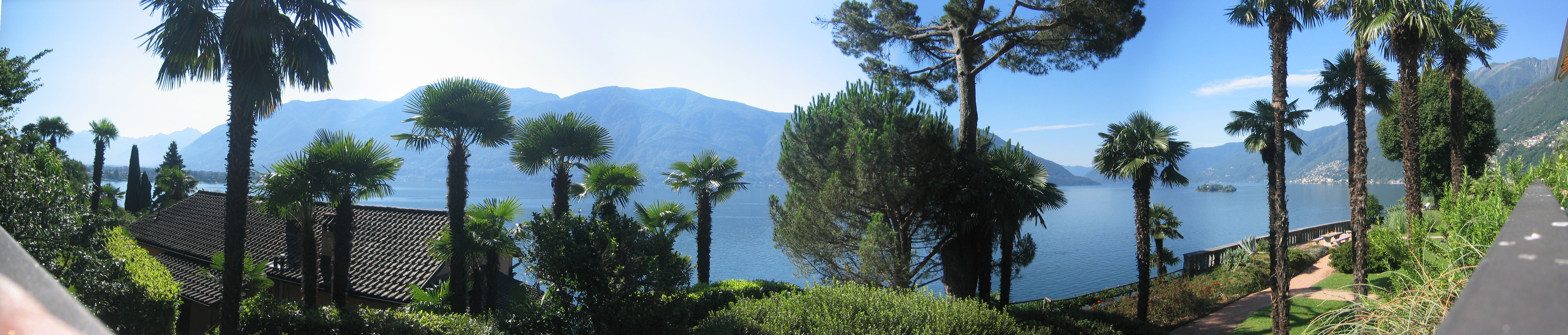
Ascona with islands of Brissago

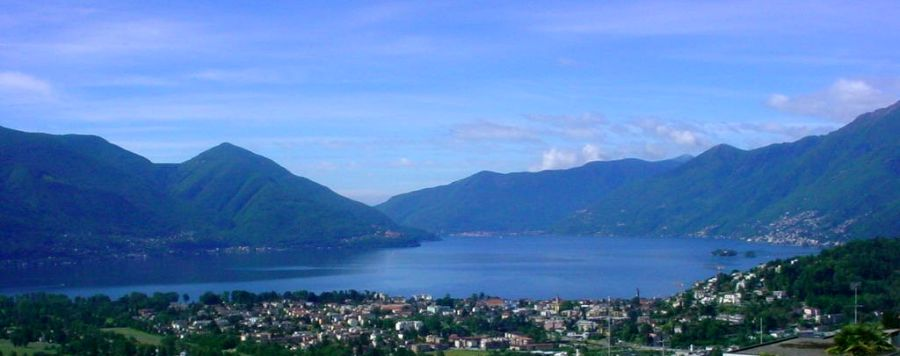
Lake Maggiore with Ascona in the foreground

Aerial view from 100 m by Walter Mittelholzer (1929)

Ascona has an area, as of 1997, of 4.97 square kilometers (1.92 sq mi). Of this area, 1.78 km^{2} (0.69 sq mi) or 35.8% is used for agricultural purposes, while 1.66 km^{2} (0.64 sq mi) or 33.4% is forested. Of the rest of the land, 2.63 km^{2} (1.02 sq mi) or 52.9% is settled (buildings or roads), 0.01 km^{2} (2.5 acres) or 0.2% is either rivers or lakes and 0.2 km^{2} (0.077 sq mi) or 4.0% is unproductive land.

Of the built up area, housing, and buildings made up 26.8% and transportation infrastructure made up 13.7%, while parks, green belts, and sports fields made up 10.9%. Out of the forested land, 28.4% of the total land area is heavily forested and 5.0% is covered with orchards or small clusters of trees. Of the agricultural land, 6.0% is used for growing crops, while 3.0% is used for orchards or vine crops, and 26.8% is used for alpine pastures. All the water in the municipality is in lakes. Of the unproductive areas, 3.8% is unproductive vegetation.

The municipality is in the Locarno District, on the right bank of the Maggia delta. It consists of the town of Ascona which includes the sections of Gerbi, Monescie, Monte Verità, Moscia, and Saleggi.

== Coat of arms ==
The blazon of the municipal coat of arms is Azure two keys argent in saltire ribboned together and in chief a papal crown of the same. The attributes of St. Peter were conceded when the bishop of Como and the church of St. Peter (S. Pietro) gave feudal rights to Ascona."

== Demographics ==
Ascona has a population (as of December 2020) of 5,554. As of 2008, 27.6% of the population are resident foreign nationals. Over the last 10 years (1997–2007) the population has changed at a rate of 10.7%.

Most of the population (as of 2000) speaks Italian (66.0%), with German being the second most common (23.9%), and Serbo-Croatian being third (2.5%). Of the Swiss national languages (as of 2000), 1,189 speak German, 112 people speak French, 3,289 people speak Italian, and 10 people speak Romansh. The remainder (384 people) speak another language.

As of 2008, the gender distribution of the population was 46.6% male and 53.4% female. The population was made up of 1,776 Swiss men (32.4% of the population), and 779 (14.2%) non-Swiss men. There were 2,202 Swiss women (40.1%), and 731 (13.3%) non-Swiss women. In 2008 there were 22 live births to Swiss citizens and 8 births to non-Swiss citizens, and in same time span there were 36 deaths of Swiss citizens and 9 non-Swiss citizen deaths. Ignoring immigration and emigration, the population of Swiss citizens decreased by 14 while the foreign population decreased by 1. There were 7 Swiss men and 3 Swiss women who immigrated back to Switzerland. At the same time, there were 43 non-Swiss men and 27 non-Swiss women who immigrated from another country to Switzerland. The total Swiss population change in 2008 (from all sources) was an increase of 17, and the non-Swiss population change was a decrease of 3 people. This represents a population growth rate of 0.3%.

The age distribution, as of 2009, in Ascona is; 365 children or 6.7% of the population are between 0 and 9 years old and 500 teenagers or 9.1% are between 10 and 19. Of the adult population, 481 people or 8.8% of the population are between 20 and 29 years old. 612 people or 11.2% are between 30 and 39, 833 people or 15.2% are between 40 and 49, and 782 people or 14.2% are between 50 and 59. The senior population distribution is 817 people or 14.9% of the population are between 60 and 69 years old, 666 people or 12.1% are between 70 and 79, there are 432 people or 7.9% who are over 80.

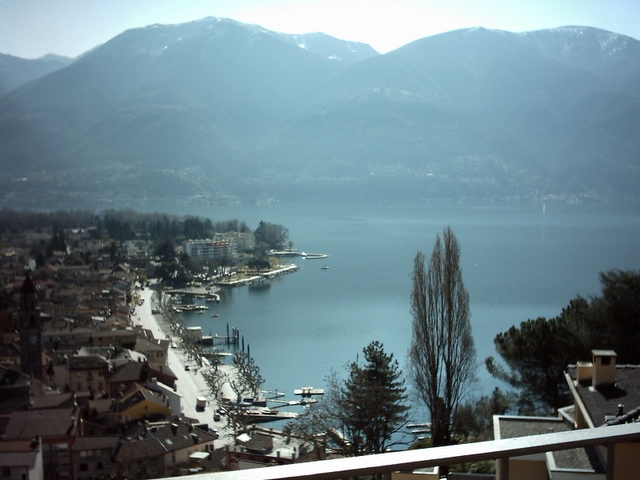
Ascona from a balcony

As of 2000, there were 2,472 private households in the municipality, and an average of 2.0 persons per household. In 2000 there were 689 single family homes (or 47.8% of the total) out of a total of 1,442 inhabited buildings. There were 194 two family buildings (13.5%) and 360 multi-family buildings (25.0%). There were also 199 buildings in the municipality that were multipurpose buildings (used for both housing and commercial or another purpose).

The vacancy rate for the municipality, in 2008, was 0.65%. In 2000 there were 4,636 apartments in the municipality. The most common apartment size was the 3 room apartment of which there were 1,567. There were 606 single room apartments and 503 apartments with five or more rooms. Of these apartments, a total of 2,465 apartments (53.2% of the total) were permanently occupied, while 2,067 apartments (44.6%) were seasonally occupied and 104 apartments (2.2%) were empty. As of 2007, the construction rate of new housing units was 11.8 new units per 1000 residents.

The historical population is given in the following table:

year	population
1591	ca. 1,000
1801	772
1850	902
1900	942
1920	1,118
1950	2,923
1980	4,722
1990	4,540
2000	4,984
2017	5,534

== Heritage sites of national significance ==
There are eleven Swiss heritage site of national significance in Ascona. There are three churches on the list: the church of S. Maria della Misericordia with the Collegio Papio, the Church of S. Michele with the ruins of a medieval castle, and the Parish Church of SS. Pietro e Paolo. Three houses are on the list: the Serodine House, the Unifamiliare Tuia House, and the Villa at via Ludwig 26. The Balladrum, a prehistoric and medieval settlement, as well as the Albergo, a park with a complex of houses, and the Monte Verità Museum, are also on the list. Two museums, the Museo comunale d’arte and the Museo Epper, and a theater, the Teatro S. Materno, finish out the list. The entire town of Ascona is listed on the Inventory of Swiss Heritage Sites.

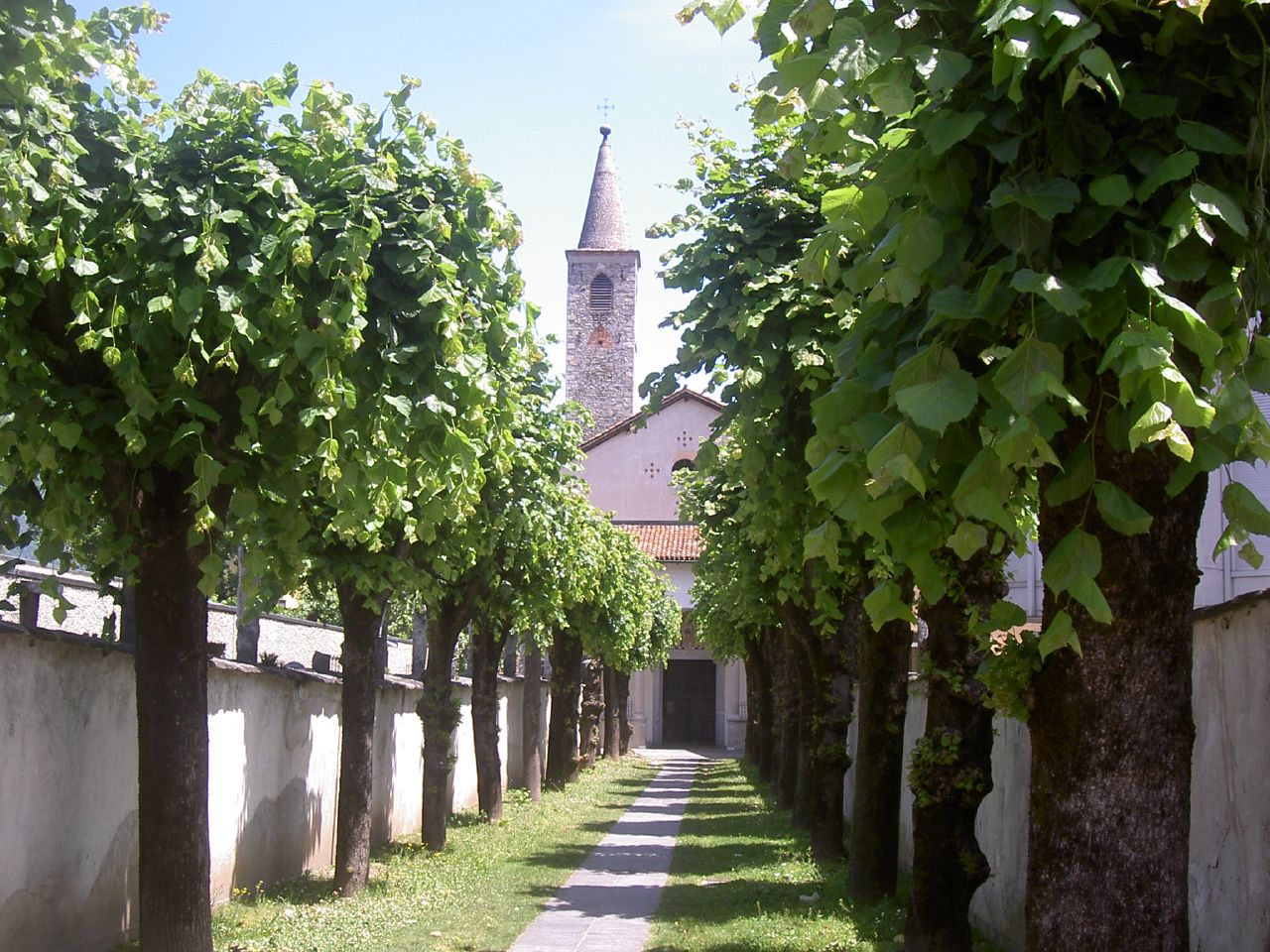
Church of S. Maria

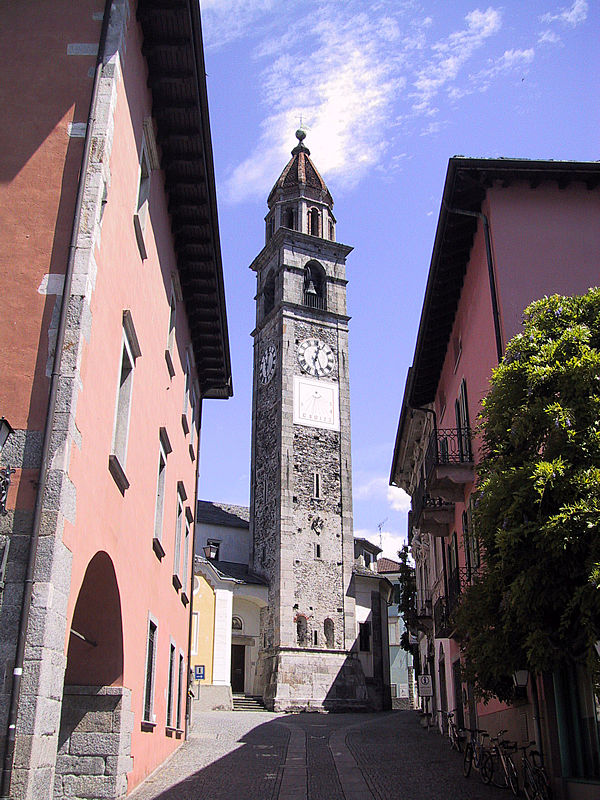
Parish Church of Ss. Pietro e Paolo

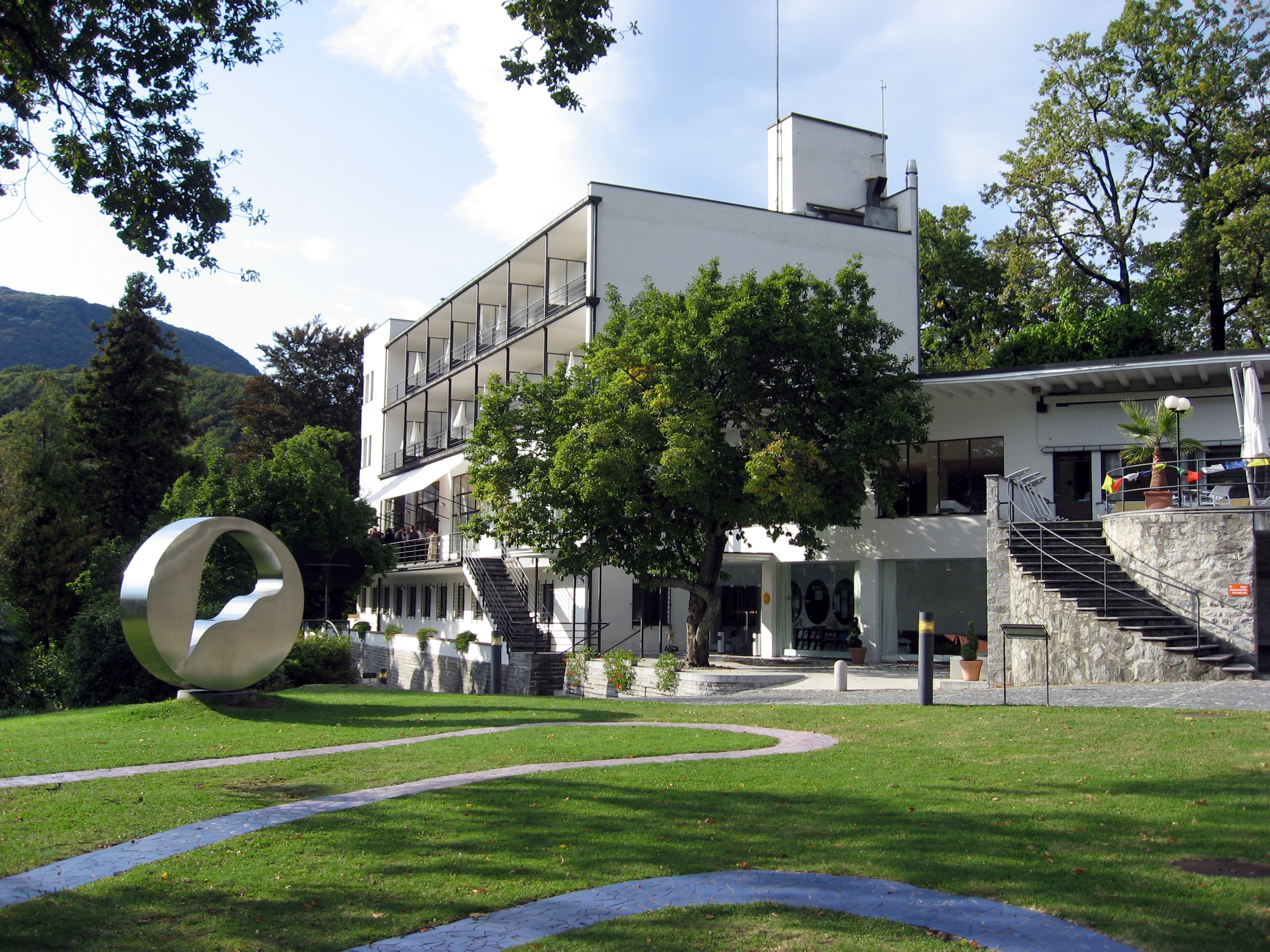
Hotel on Monte Verità

== Politics ==
In the 2007 federal election the most popular party was the FDP which received 32.24% of the vote. The next three most popular parties were the CVP (18.93%), the SVP (15.89%) and the SP (15.29%). In the federal election, a total of 1,419 votes were cast, and the voter turnout was 41.4%.

In the 2007 Gran Consiglio election, there were a total of 3,346 registered voters in Ascona, of which 1,763 or 52.7% voted. 37 blank ballots and 2 null ballots were cast, leaving 1,724 valid ballots in the election. The most popular party was the PLRT, which received 422 or 24.5% of the vote. The next three most popular parties were; the PPD+GenGiova (with 323 or 18.7%), the SSI (with 307 or 17.8%) and the PS (with 215 or 12.5%).

In the 2007 Consiglio di Stato election, 29 blank ballots and 8 null ballots were cast, leaving 1,726 valid ballots in the election. The most popular party was the PLRT which received 409 or 23.7% of the vote. The next three most popular parties were; the PPD (with 338 or 19.6%), the LEGA (with 311 or 18.0%) and the SSI (with 254 or 14.7%).

== Economy ==
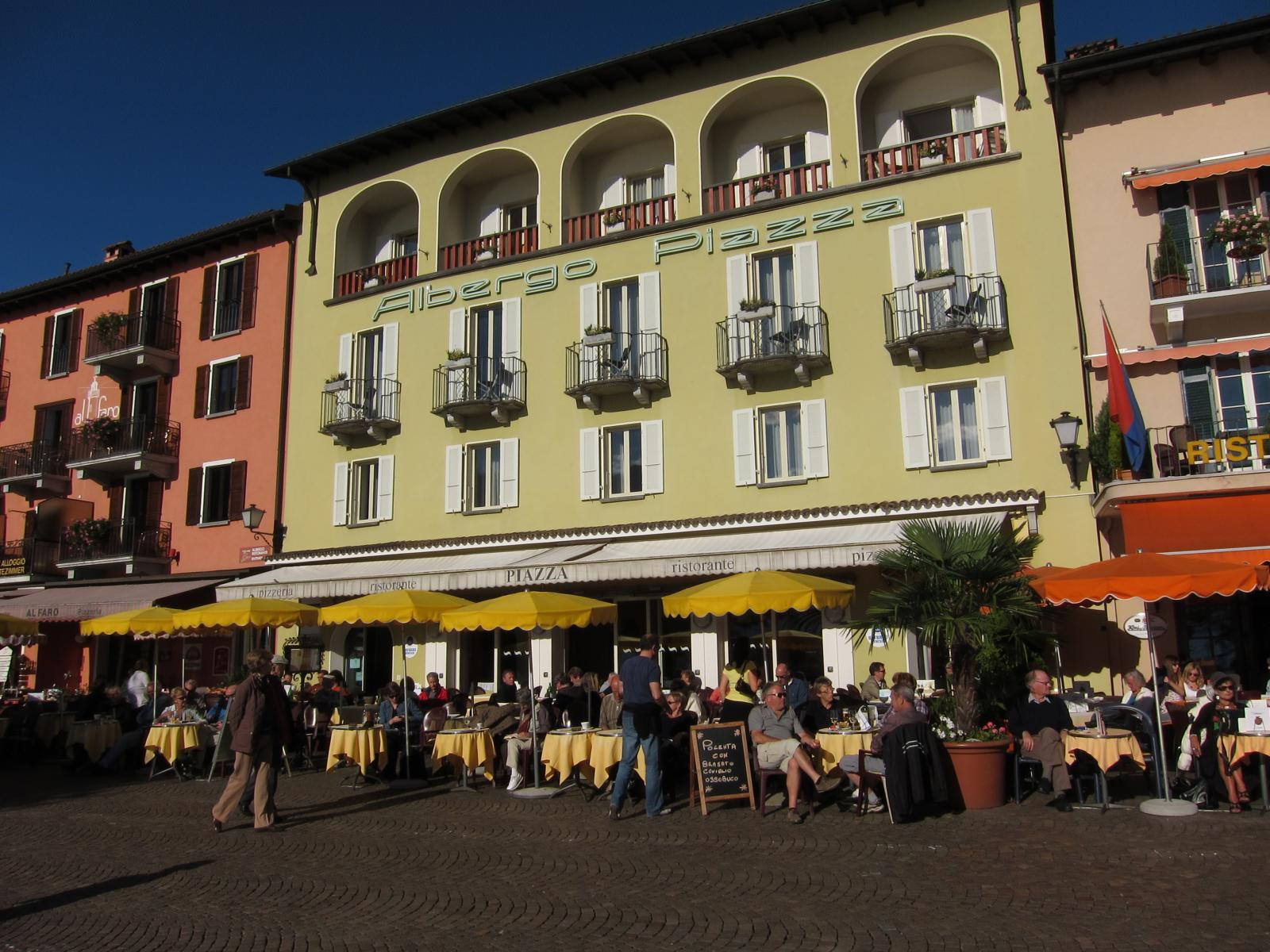
Piazza Hotel, one of the many hotels in Ascona

As of 2007, Ascona had an unemployment rate of 4.99%. As of 2005, there were 9 people employed in the primary economic sector and about 3 businesses involved in this sector. 361 people were employed in the secondary sector and there were 47 businesses in this sector. 2,683 people were employed in the tertiary sector, with 353 businesses in this sector. There were 2,233 residents of the municipality who were employed in some capacity, of which females made up 46.0% of the workforce.

In 2000, there were 2,056 workers who commuted into the municipality and 1,149 workers who commuted away. The municipality is a net importer of workers, with about 1.8 workers entering the municipality for every one leaving. About 16.0% of the workforce coming into Ascona are coming from outside Switzerland, while 0.1% of the locals commute out of Switzerland for work. Of the working population, 7.5% used public transportation to get to work, and 47.8% used a private car.

As of 2009, there were 34 hotels in Ascona with a total of 1,192 rooms and 2,230 beds.

== Religion ==
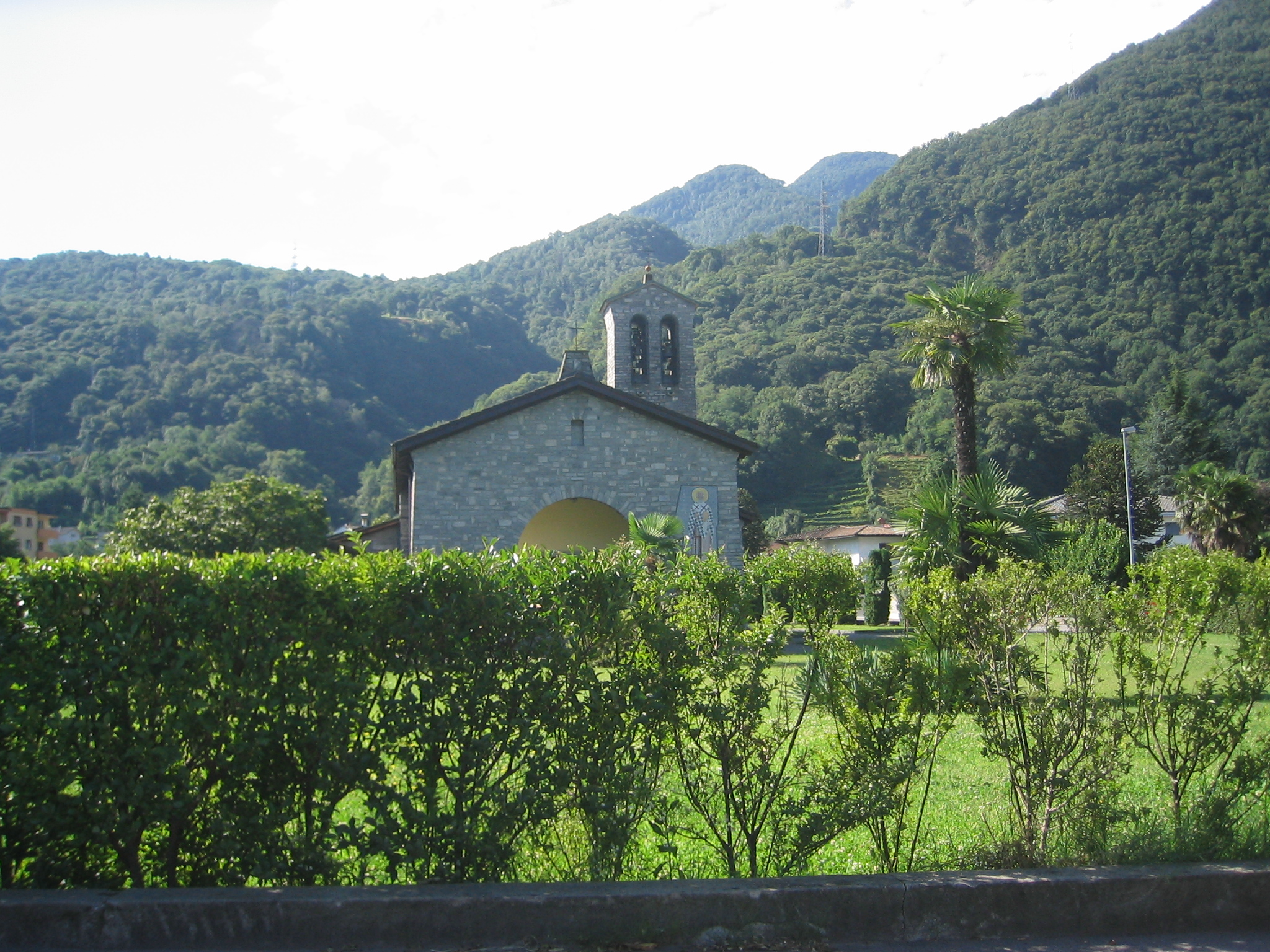
Church in Ascona

From the 2000 census, 3,308 or 66.4% were Roman Catholic, while 835 or 16.8% belonged to the Swiss Reformed Church. There are 606 individuals (or about 12.16% of the population) who belong to another church (not listed on the census), and 235 individuals (or about 4.72% of the population) did not answer the question.

== Education ==
In Ascona about 69.6% of the population (between age 25-64) have completed either non-mandatory upper secondary education or additional higher education (either university or a Fachhochschule).

In Ascona there were a total of 766 students (as of 2009). The Ticino education system provides up to three years of non-mandatory kindergarten, and in Ascona there were 94 children in kindergarten. The primary school program lasts for five years and includes both a standard school and a special school. In the municipality, 217 students attended the standard primary schools and 10 students attended the special school. In the lower secondary school system, students either attend a two-year middle school followed by a two-year pre-apprenticeship, or they attend a four-year program to prepare for higher education. There were 213 students in the two-year middle school and 1 in their pre-apprenticeship, while 123 students were in the four-year advanced program.

The upper secondary school includes several options, but at the end of the upper secondary program, a student will be prepared to enter a trade or to continue on to a university or college. In Ticino, vocational students may either attend school while working on their internship or apprenticeship (which takes three or four years) or may attend school followed by an internship or apprenticeship (which takes one year as a full-time student or one and a half to two years as a part-time student). There were 26 vocational students who were attending school full-time and 73 who attend part-time.

The professional program lasts three years and prepares a student for a job in engineering, nursing, computer science, business, tourism and similar fields. There were 9 students in the professional program.

As of 2000, there were 231 students in Ascona who came from another municipality, while 213 residents attended schools outside the municipality.

== Crime ==
In 2014 the crime rate, of the over 200 crimes listed in the Swiss Criminal Code (running from murder, robbery, and assault to accepting bribes and election fraud), in Ascona was 64.4 per thousand residents, slightly lower than the national average (64.6 per thousand). During the same period, the rate of drug crimes was 5.5 per thousand residents. This rate is lower than average, only 48.2% of the rate in the district, 62.5% of the rate in the canton, and 55.6% of the national rate. The rate of violations of immigration, visa and work permit laws was 1.7 per thousand residents. This rate is lower than average, 47.2% of the rate in the canton and 34.7% of the rate for the entire country.

== Notable people ==
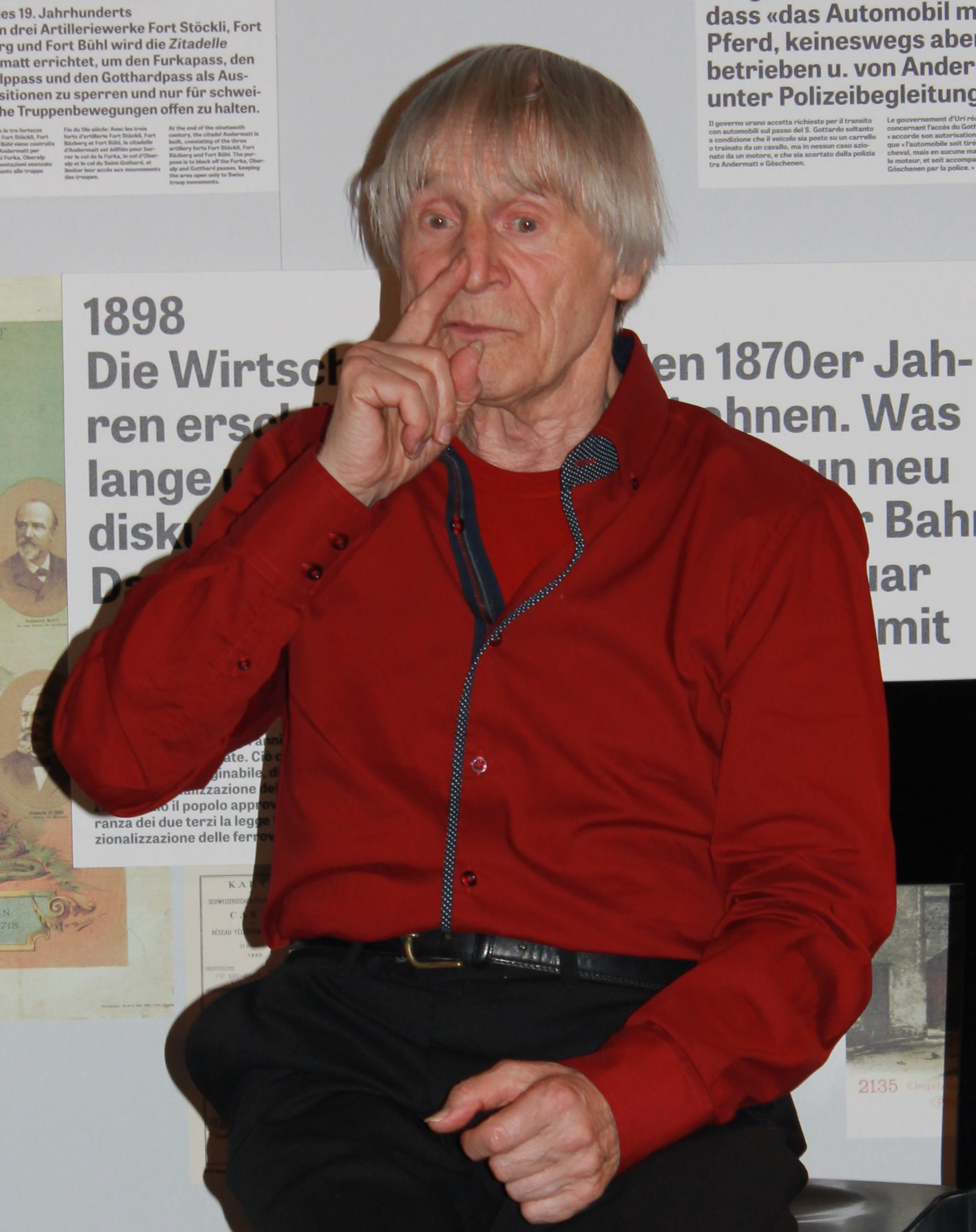
Dimitri, 2016

- Dimitri (1935 in Ascona – 2016), a Swiss clown and mime artist
- Daniela Ambrosoli (born 1941 in Ascona), a Swiss entrepreneur, philanthropist, and film director
- Bruno Bisang (born 1952 in Ascona), a Swiss fashion photographer
- Paolo Duca (born 1981 in Ascona), a Swiss former professional ice hockey player
- Brigitte Helm (1906 – 1996 in Ascona), German actress who fled Nazi Germany for Switzerland and died in Ascona
- Gaetano Matteo Pisoni (1713 in Ascona – 1782), an Italian architect, worked in a Late Baroque manner
- Marianne von Werefkin (1860 – 1938 in Ascona), a Russian-German-Swiss Expressionist painter, lived in Ascona from 1918
- Anthony van Hoboken (1887–1983), a musical collector, bibliographer, and musicologist; lived in Ascona 1951 to 1977
- Wladimir Vogel (1896–1984), a Swiss composer of German and Russian extraction, lived in Ascona 1939-1964
- Gregor Wentzel (1898–1978 in Ascona), a German physicist known for development of quantum mechanics, lived in Ascona from 1970
