= Taddeo Duno =

Swiss physician and reformer (1523–1613)

- Born: 1523; Locarno, Old Swiss Confederacy
- Died: 1613; Zürich, Old Swiss Confederacy
- Other names: Taddeo Duni
- Occupations: Physician, translator
- Known for: Medical research, Protestant reformer

Taddeo Duno (also Taddeo Duni; 1523–1613) was an Italian-Swiss physician, Protestant reformer and medical researcher. Born into an ancient noble family from Locarno, he was among the Protestant refugees from Locarno who fled to Zürich in 1555 following religious persecution. He made significant contributions to early medical research, particularly in the relationship between meteorology and disease.

== Early life and education ==
Duno was born in 1523 in Locarno to an ancient noble family originally from Ascona. During his youth, he came under the influence of Giovanni Beccaria, a Milanese theologian who had been teaching at Locarno's Latin school since 1536 and who spread the first ideas of the Reformation among his students and their families.

Duno studied medicine and the liberal arts at Basel from 1545 to 1547, then continued his studies at Pavia from 1547 to 1548, where he obtained his doctorate.

== Religious activities and persecution ==
On 5 August 1549, Duno participated alongside Beccaria in the theological disputation of Locarno, which he later documented in his work De persequutione adversus Locarnenses (1602). While practicing as a physician in Asso, his religious opinions led to his denunciation to the Inquisition in 1551.

In 1553, Duno returned to Locarno with his family. The case of the Locarno reformers was subsequently addressed at two Diets in Baden in July and November 1554. In a tense climate and after long and difficult discussions, the decision was made to force those who refused to recant to leave Locarno. On 3 March 1555, Duno and about a hundred other Locarnesi left the city, crossing the Mesolcina valley and the San Bernardino Pass. He arrived in Zürich in May 1555.

== Medical career and scientific work ==
After settling in Zürich, Duno continued to practice medicine. He studied the theories of Hippocrates and Galen, then focused on the observation of nature and epidemiological manifestations. The results of his reflections were compiled in De respiratione contra Galenum (1588). His work Epistolae medicinales (1592) constituted the first research on the relationship between meteorology and the occurrence of diseases.

In addition to his intense scientific activity in the field of medicine, Duno translated works on history, theology and mathematics into Latin.

== Bibliography ==
- A. Chenou, "Taddeo Duno et la Réforme à Locarno", in AST, 71, 1971, pp. 237–294
- R. Ceschi, Contrade Cisalpine, pp. 68–73
