= Martino Muralto =

Martino Muralto (Locarno c.1521-1566) was an Italian lawyer and elder in the exiled Italian Protestant church in Zürich. The church was made up of 250 members, many refugees from Locarno, and was an influential centre of free Italian Protestantism outside Italy during the period 1540–1620. Muralto accompanied Lelio Sozzini to Basel, to secure Bernardino Ochino as pastor at Zürich in 1553, and ten years later it was Muralto again who made a final appeal to Bullinger to intervene in Ochino's expulsion from the city in 1563, following Ochino's Thirty Dialogues, which included a dialogue questioning the Trinity and other matters which attracted opposition.
