= Daniela Ambrosoli =

Swiss entrepreneur

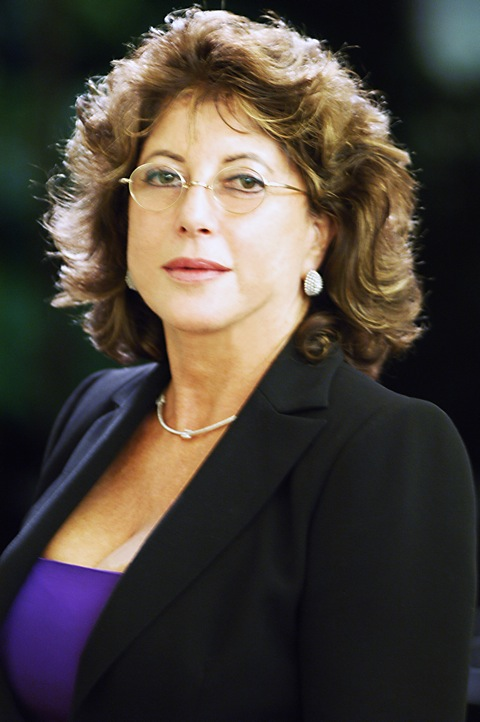
Daniela Ambrosoli in 2010

Daniela Ambrosoli (born 10 November 1941 in Locarno, Switzerland) is a Swiss entrepreneur, owner of Camping Delta SA Locarno, philanthropist, film producer and director, and founder and president of the Pierino Ambrosoli Foundation, a non-profit organization that supports the performing arts and artists.

== Private life ==
Daniela Ambrosoli was born at Clinica Sant'Agnese in Locarno, Switzerland on 10 November 1941 to Pierino Ambrosoli (1905–1975) and Sonja Bragowa (1903–1998). Pierino Ambrosoli was a third-generation member of the Ambrosoli family from Lombardy which settled in Locarno, and he became a highly successful businessman who amassed a fortune through automobile importing and dealerships and real estate. Sonja Bragowa was a German stage performer, engaged in Mary Wigman’s expressionist dance company and as a principal dancer at the Oper Frankfurt . Daniela grew up in Ascona, Switzerland. In 1963 she married Chico Rima, who one year later died in an automobile accident. In 1969 Daniela married Jaques Merker, a psychiatrist. Their first child, a son, was born that year and their second son was born in 1971. The family resided in both Ascona and Geneva. In 1978 Daniela Ambrosoli and Jaques Merker divorced and she married Locarno school teacher Franz Marcacci. Their daughter was born in 1977. Pierino Ambrosoli died in 1975 and left Daniela a large inheritance. She took over some of the companies he founded, including the real estate management company Amministrazioni Immobiliari Ambrosoli and the holiday village Camping Delta on Lake Maggiore in Locarno, which she currently manages with Mila Merker. In 1999 she founded Travel & Culture Management AG in Zurich.

== Pierino Ambrosoli Foundation ==
Pierino Ambrosoli died in 1975 and left Daniela a large inheritance. She decided to use much of these funds to formally promote and support the training of talented young dancers and musicians. In 1990 she founded the Pierino Ambrosoli Foundation, domiciled in Zurich, and named in honor of her father, entrepreneur Pierino Ambrosoli, source of the financial means, and her mother, expressionist dancer Sonja Bragowa, to whom Daniela owes her love of the performing arts. The foundation awards training scholarships and production grants, offers counseling for young artists and their parents, collaborates with schools, cultural institutions, theatres, and dance companies, and serves as a facilitator for international auditions and competitions. The Pierino Ambrosoli Foundation has supported well over two hundred promising young talents from a total of 39 countries in ballet, contemporary dance, theater, choreography, music, circus, mime, film, dance theater, journalism, and dance retraining. Many scholarship recipients have become internationally renowned professionals. The list of artists in whose career the foundation played a crucial role includes e.g. Matias Oberlin, Ivan Urban, Dmitry Smirnov, Miriam Prandi, Ilva Eigus, and Lucia Solari.

== Performing arts patron ==
Daniela Ambrosoli’s support of the performing arts also took other forms. In addition to granting scholarships through the foundation, she supported many associated organizations and events, particularly from 1989 to 2010. She sat on several executive boards of international associations involved with dance, music, and humanitarian issues. Daniela organized eleven annual audition events in Switzerland for the Rotterdam Dance Academy/Codarts. As a result, a total of 88 applicants from fourteen nations received an invitation to train at the Rotterdam Dance Academy/Codarts, nine of whom received a scholarship from the Pierino Ambrosoli Foundation, e.g. Madeline Harms. The Pierino Ambrosoli Foundation partnered closely with the Prix de Lausanne annual international ballet competition for many years, sponsoring at least 11 scholarship awards from 1991 to 2000. Through the foundation, Daniela sponsored the Zurich University of the Arts, awarding scholarships for music and dance from 2005 to 2020. She also supported various programs like the "Yondering Exchange" program conducted by the Hamburg Ballet School and the National Ballet School of Canada. In 2000, Anna Laudere, principal dancer of the Hamburg Ballet, took part in that program, thanks to a grant by the Pierino Ambrosoli Foundation.

== Philanthropy ==
Through her involvement with the performing arts, Daniela became acutely aware of the extreme physical and psychological demands of rigorous training and performance which artists must endure. In her words: “Dancers live like nuns and monks. They do with little, earn poorly, and by the age of 25 are already suffering in pain.” Concerned about these hardships and risks, she strove to improve the overall conditions for dancers’ health and well-being. She served in and supported associated professional organizations, made sure her foundation provided scholarships only those young talents who show sufficient physical and psychological stamina, and delivered talks on this topic at international dance conferences, such as "Not Just Any Body," held in Toronto and The Hague by the International Organisation for the Transition of Professional Dancers (IOTPD) in 1998. From the mid-1990s to the early 2000s Daniela served as a board member of Danse Transition, an organization that helps dancers succeed in a professional transition at the end of their performing career. Through the foundation, she provided retraining scholarships to dancers such as Ketty Bucca, who was awarded scholarships from 1992 to 1994 to train at the Swiss National Ballet School in Zurich and later danced for ten years at the Wiener Staatsoper. In 2003 and 2004 she received scholarships to retrain as a Pilates teacher and then became a renowned Pilates trainer in London. In 2001 Daniela participated at the 8th council meeting of the IOTPD in Amsterdam. At the invitation of the Soroptimist Club Interlaken, she delivered a lecture on crucial aspects of ballet training. Daniela Ambrosoli’s humanitarian and social engagement went beyond the boundaries of dance, taking other forms too, such as her membership on the board of Soroptimist Union Switzerland. In October 2000 she was voted Coordinator for Education and Culture of Soroptimist Union Switzerland. In collaboration with this organization, she organized a charity gala in Locarno for the benefit of the "Comité International pour la Dignité de l'Enfant. Through the foundation, she donated substantial sums to CIDE over the years. In March 2009 Daniela was voted president of the Swiss Scholarship Commission of Soroptimist Union Switzerland. She also sat on the board of EQUILIBRIUM, a Swiss organization dedicated to overcoming depressions and mood disorders.

== Film directing and awards ==
Having grown up with the Locarno Film Festival at her doorstep, Daniela Ambrosoli had a natural affinity for film. Invited by Marco Müller, director of the film festival from 1990 to 2000, she joined the board of trustees of the local Fondazione Monte Cinema Verità in 1994, the year after that foundation was established. Through Shari Marcacci, film writer and director, and Aliocha Merker, still photographer and cameraman, Daniela gained access to the professional film world. From 2004 to 2017 she worked as assistant director, production manager and translator for director Renato Pugina on ten TV documentary productions for the Italophone Swiss television station RSI, including "La Depressione, un male oscuro" (2004), "Sul corpo e nel cuore" (2007), "In un corpo sbagliato" and "Madri figlicide" (2010), "L'ultimo viaggio" (2013) and "Figli? No grazie!" (2017). 2009 marked Daniela’s debut as a film director with the release of "HN - Hermann Nitsch," which she wrote and directed. This, her first documentary, proved she is not afraid of treating taboo subjects. The film is an intimate portrait of the renowned and controversial Austrian painter, performer, composer, writer, and co-founder of Viennese Actionism, best known for his blood orgies. In 2011 the film received the Audience Choice Award for Best Documentary at the Beverly Hills Film Festival in Los Angeles.

Furthering her efforts to better the lot of professional dancers, in 2017 Daniela produced and directed "The Making of a Dream - Life as a ballet dancer," a cinematic essay on dance, dancers, and their professional lives. One of her main intentions was to make young people fully aware of the harsh brutality of the ballet “dream world.” The film shows the grueling journey of ambitious young dancers, from their childhood steps in an amateur dance school to their careers as principal dancers in major ballet companies. As in all her documentaries, Daniela illuminated the theme based on personal stories. In 2018 the film was awarded Best Documentary at the Utah Dance Film Festival and Best Documentary at the Austrian Independent Film Festival. While dealing with dancers featured in that film, Daniela Ambrosoli was moved by the desire of gay men to have a family with their own children. This led to her next documentary, “papa & dada,” which she directed and produced in 2021. It illustrates the feelings, struggles, obstacles, and joys of starting a family as a couple of two men. Daniela wove illustrative animated interludes into the storyline. In 2023 the film was awarded Best US Documentary Feature at the New York Independent Cinema Awards. Daniela Ambrosoli is currently working on her next film, which builds on "papa & dada": a short stop-motion animation about gay families.

== Biography ==
Daniela Ambrosoli’s biography, "Tochter aus besserem Hause" (in German), was written by Markus Maeder published by Antium Verlag in 2020. 287 pages. ISBN 978-3-907132-10-4 lokalinfo.ch

== Filmography ==
Ambrosoli productions:

- HN Hermann Nitsch, 2009, documentary; director
- The Making of a Dream, 2017, documentary; producer, director
- papa & dada, 2021, documentary; producer, director

Documentaries for RSI (Italophone Swiss television station RSI) in collaboration with Italian director Renato Pugina:

- Depressione un male oscuro, 2004, documentary RSI; assistant director
- Sul corpo e nel cuore, 2007, documentary RSI; assistant director
- In un corpo sbagliato, 2009, documentary RSI; assistant director
- Madri figlicide, 2010, documentary RSI; assistant director
- Der Fisch, short 2011 by Shari Yantra Marcacci; executive producer
- Per Amor di Dio, 2011, documentary RSI; co-director
- L'ultimo viaggio, 2013, documentary RSI; assistant director
- I sopravvissuti, 2014, documentary RSI; assistant director,
- Il sogno di Hans, 2015, documentary RSI; assistant director,
- Via dal Ticino, 2015, documentary RSI; assistant director,
- Figli? No grazie!, 2017, documentary RSI; assistant director

== Film awards ==
"HN - Hermann Nitsch"

- Beverly Hills Film Festival 2011, Audience Choice Award – Best Documentary

"The Making of a Dream"

- Utah Dance Film Festival 2018, Best Documentary
- Austrian Independent Film Festival 2018, Best Documentary

"papa&dada"

- New York Independent Cinema Awards 2023, Best US Documentary Feature
- East Europe International Film Festival, Warsaw Edition 2022, award winner
- Fusion International Film Festival 2022, LGBTQ Award

== Press ==
- helvetic.LA news online

https://helveticla.wordpress.com/2011/04/06/swiss-filmmaker-daniela-ambrosoli-from-asconati-presents-hn-hermann-nitsch-at-the-2011-beverly-hills-film-festival/

- laRegione news online, 3 Oct. 2023: papa&dada (in Italian)

https://www.laregione.ch/cantone/locarnese/1701953/coppie-ticino-canada-daniela-ambrosoli

- laRegione news online, 17 Sept. 2020: presentation of biography (in Italian)

https://www.laregione.ch/cantone/locarnese/1461448/ambrosoli-locarnese-daniela-lavoro-cognome

- Fluntern magazine, July/August 2023, page 5: papa&dada (in German)

https://fluntern-magazin.ch/wp-content/uploads/2022/07/07-08_22_Fluntern-Magazin.pdf

- Zürich Nord newspaper, No. 20/21, 14 May 2020, page 7, interview (in German)

https://www.lokalinfo.ch/fileadmin/_migrated/content_uploads/ZN_2020_05_14.pdf
