= Johannes Muralt =

16th-century surgeon in Zurich

- Born: c. 1500; Locarno
- Died: between 12 January and 4 February 1579; Zurich
- Other names: Giovanni Muralto
- Occupation: Surgeon
- Spouse: Barbara Muralto

Johannes Muralt (c. 1500 – between 12 January and 4 February 1579), also known as Giovanni Muralto, was a surgeon who became the first religious refugee to receive citizenship in Zurich. Originally from Locarno, he was a member of the Protestant community there before relocating to Zurich in 1555. He was the founder of the Zurich branch of the Muralt family.

== Life and career ==
A member of the Protestant community of Locarno, Muralt came to Zurich in 1555, where the city granted refuge to the surgeon and his family along with about a hundred co-religionists.

During the plague of 1564–1565, he treated the antistes Heinrich Bullinger alongside Conrad Gessner, the city physician. From 1566, he worked as a surgeon (Wundarzt) for the city of Zurich.

== Citizenship and social integration ==
As the first refugee for religious reasons to be received as a citizen of Zurich, Muralt succeeded in arranging marriages between his two sons and daughters of the Orelli and Bononia families. Through these connections, he opened the door to Zurich society and economy for other families from Locarno.

== See also ==
- Muralto family

== Bibliography ==
- Keller-Escher, Carl Caspar: "Die Einbürgerung der Familie von Muralt in Zürich und die Frage ihrer Regimentsfähigkeit", in: Archives héraldiques suisses, 25/1, 1911, pp. 9–14.
- Schulthess, Hans: Bilder aus der Vergangenheit der Familie von Muralt in Zürich, 1944.
