= Muralto =

- Municipality
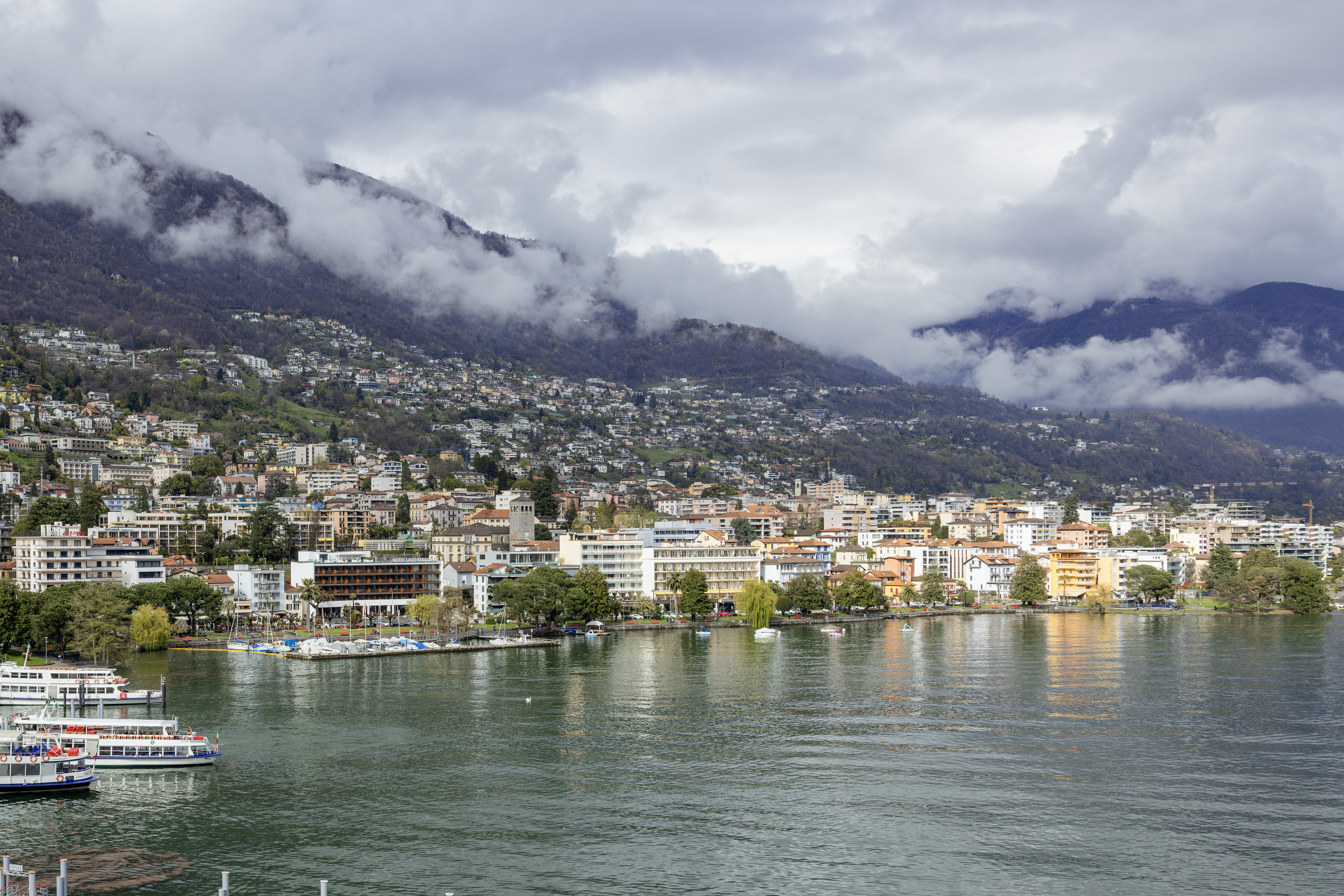

- Flag Coat of arms
- Location of Muralto
- Location within Switzerland Location within Canton of Ticino
- Coordinates: 46°10′N 8°48′E
- Country: Switzerland
- Canton: Ticino
- District: Locarno

Government
  - Mayor: Sindaco

Area
  - Total: 0.6 km^{2} (0.23 sq mi)
- Elevation: 207 m (679 ft)

Population (December 2017)
  - Total: 2,861
  - Density: 4,800/km^{2} (12,000/sq mi)
- Time zone: UTC+01:00 (CET)
  - Summer (DST): UTC+02:00 (CEST)
- Postal code: 6600
- SFOS number: 5120
- ISO 3166 code: CH-TI
- Surrounded by: Locarno, Minusio, Orselina, Piazzogna, San Nazzaro
- Website: muralto.ch

Muralto is a municipality in the district of Locarno, in the canton of Ticino in Switzerland.

== Geography ==
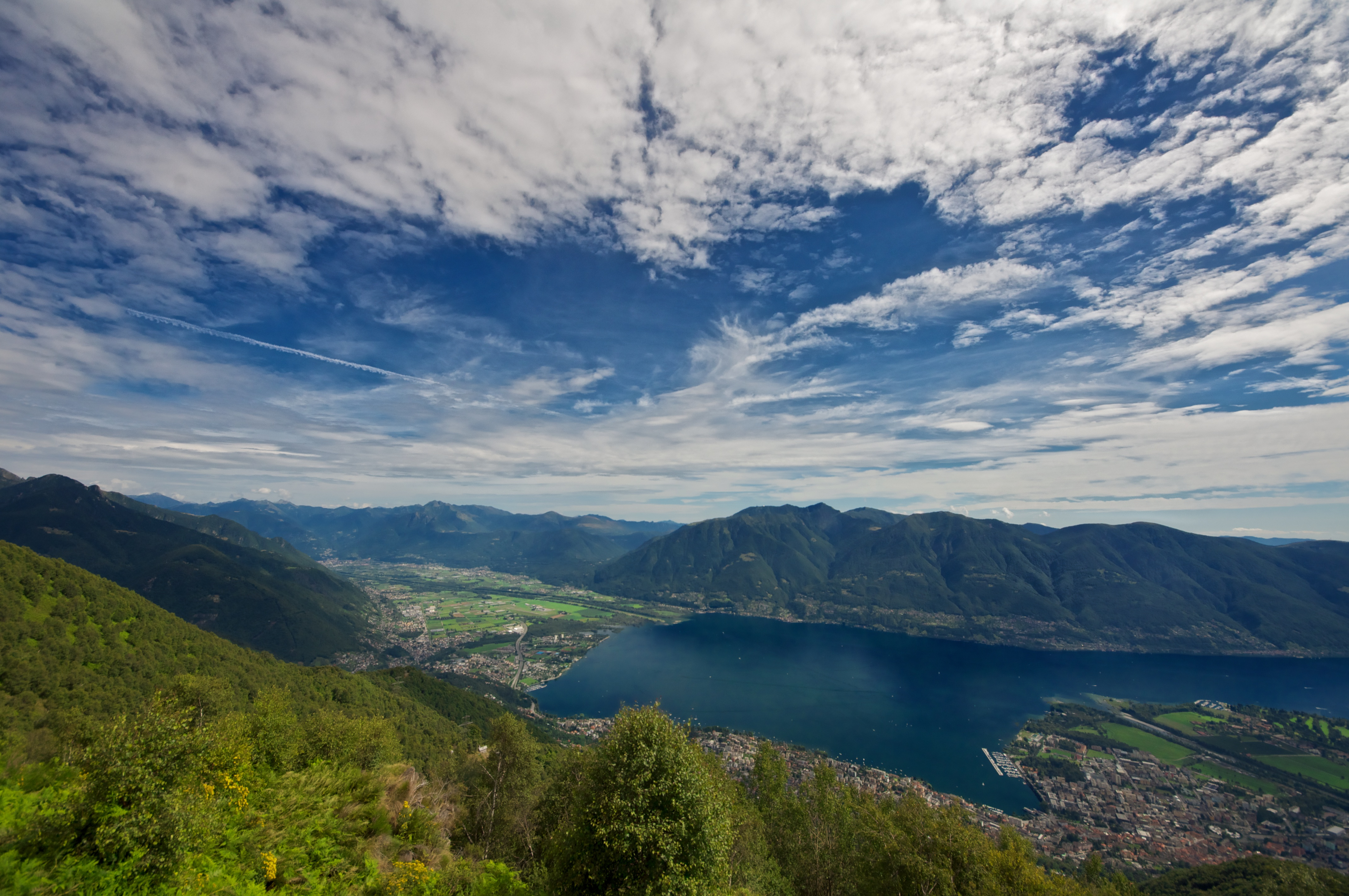
View of Lake Maggiore, with (l-r) Vogorno, Mergoscia, Gordola, Minusio, Brione sopra Minusio, Muralto, Locarno

Aerial view from 500 m by Walter Mittelholzer (1919)

Muralto has an area, as of 1997, of 0.6 square kilometers (0.23 sq mi). Of this area, 0.43 km^{2} (0.17 sq mi) or 71.7% is used for agricultural purposes, while 0.02 km^{2} (0.0077 sq mi) or 3.3% is forested. Of the rest of the land, 0.56 km^{2} (0.22 sq mi) or 93.3% is settled (buildings or roads) and 0.01 km^{2} (2.5 acres) or 1.7% is unproductive land.

Of the built up area, housing and buildings made up 68.3% and transportation infrastructure made up 18.3%. while parks, green belts and sports fields made up 6.7%. Out of the forested land, 1.7% of the total land area is heavily forested and 1.7% is covered with orchards or small clusters of trees. Of the agricultural land, 1.7% is used for growing crops, while 1.7% is used for orchards or vine crops and 68.3% is used for alpine pastures.

The municipality is located in the Locarno district, in the agglomeration of Locarno. It lies along Lake Maggiore and is bordered by the Ramogna and Rabissale streams. It was created in 1881, when it separated from Orselina.

== Demographics ==
Muralto has a population (as of December 2020) of 2,604. As of 2008, 26.9% of the population are resident foreign nationals. Over the last 10 years (1997–2007) the population has changed at a rate of -1.1%.

Most of the population (as of 2000) speaks Italian (68.4%), with German being second most common (19.9%) and Macedonian being third (2.8%). Of the Swiss national languages (as of 2000), 533 speak German, 55 people speak French, 1,830 people speak Italian, and 6 people speak Romansh. The remainder (252 people) speak another language.

As of 2008, the gender distribution of the population was 45.8% male and 54.2% female. The population was made up of 903 Swiss men (32.3% of the population), and 378 (13.5%) non-Swiss men. There were 1,171 Swiss women (41.8%), and 347 (12.4%) non-Swiss women.

In 2008 there were 12 live births to Swiss citizens and 8 births to non-Swiss citizens, and in same time span there were 36 deaths of Swiss citizens and 10 non-Swiss citizen deaths. Ignoring immigration and emigration, the population of Swiss citizens decreased by 24 while the foreign population decreased by 2. There were 2 Swiss men and 4 Swiss women who immigrated back to Switzerland. At the same time, there were 24 non-Swiss men and 20 non-Swiss women who immigrated from another country to Switzerland. The total Swiss population change in 2008 (from all sources, including moves across municipal borders) was a decrease of 4 and the non-Swiss population change was an increase of 25 people. This represents a population growth rate of 0.7%.

The age distribution, as of 2009, in Muralto is; 177 children or 6.3% of the population are between 0 and 9 years old and 185 teenagers or 6.6% are between 10 and 19. Of the adult population, 289 people or 10.3% of the population are between 20 and 29 years old. 332 people or 11.9% are between 30 and 39, 395 people or 14.1% are between 40 and 49, and 375 people or 13.4% are between 50 and 59. The senior population distribution is 406 people or 14.5% of the population are between 60 and 69 years old, 312 people or 11.1% are between 70 and 79, there are 328 people or 11.7% who are over 80.

As of 2000, there were 1,448 private households in the municipality, and an average of 1.8 persons per household. In 2000 there were 92 single family homes (or 22.9% of the total) out of a total of 402 inhabited buildings. There were 49 two family buildings (12.2%) and 167 multi-family buildings (41.5%). There were also 94 buildings in the municipality that were multipurpose buildings (used for both housing and commercial or another purpose).

The vacancy rate for the municipality, in 2008, was 0.37%. In 2000 there were 2,106 apartments in the municipality. The most common apartment size was the 3 room apartment of which there were 659. There were 247 single room apartments and 221 apartments with five or more rooms. Of these apartments, a total of 1,435 apartments (68.1% of the total) were permanently occupied, while 612 apartments (29.1%) were seasonally occupied and 59 apartments (2.8%) were empty. As of 2007, the construction rate of new housing units was 4.3 new units per 1000 residents.

The historical population is given in the following table:

year	population
1850	782
1888	1,019
1900	1,502
1910	1,950
1950	2,673
1970	3,090
2017	2,861

== Heritage sites of national significance ==
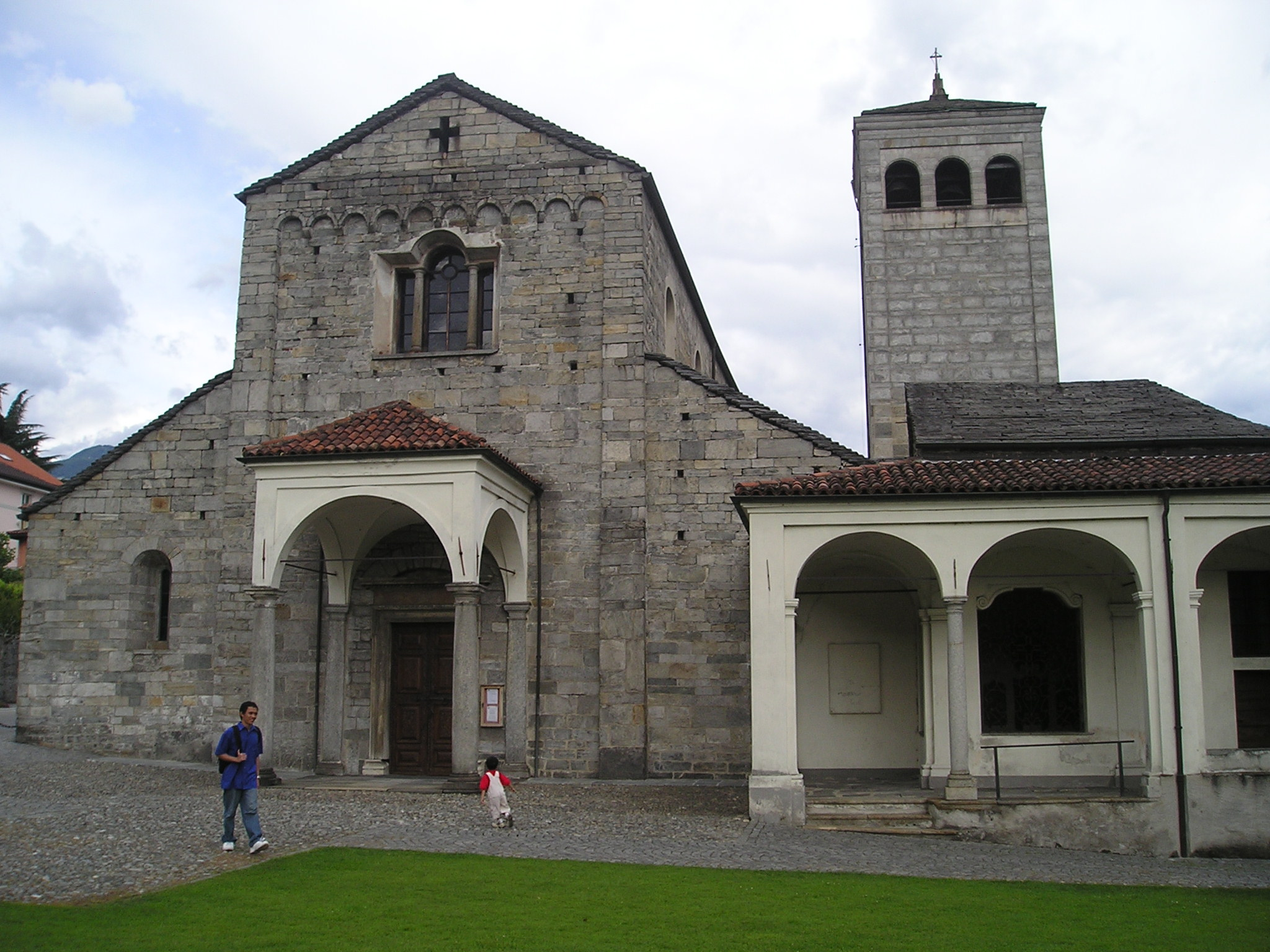
Collegiata Di S. Vittore

The Collegiata Di S. Vittore, the Grand Hotel and the Vicus at via della Collegiata/via del Municipio are listed as Swiss heritage site of national significance.

== Transportation ==
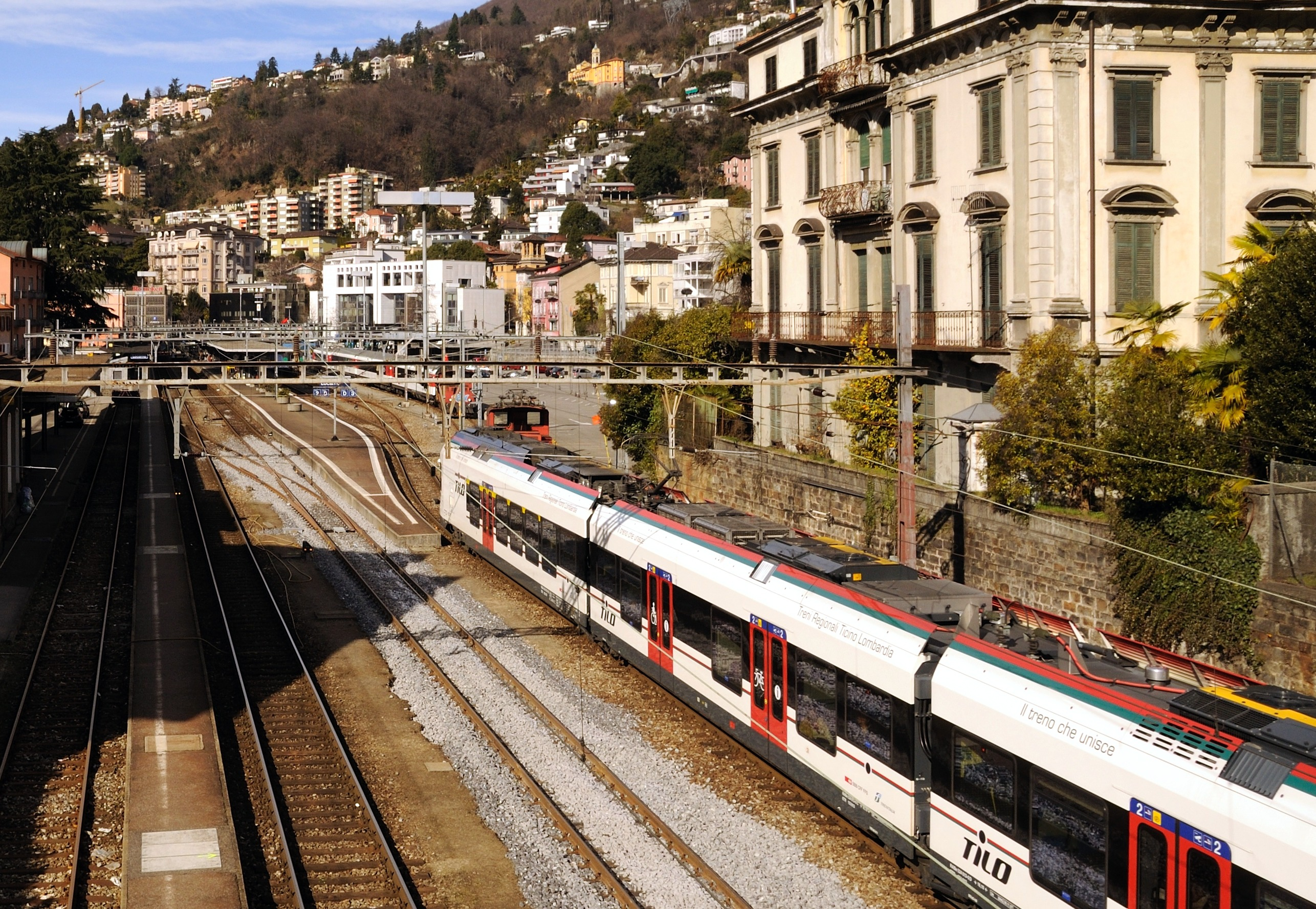
Train arriving at the Muralto-Locarno railway station

The Locarno railway station is located within the Muralto municipality.

== Politics ==
In the 2007 federal election the most popular party was the CVP which received 30.17% of the vote. The next three most popular parties were the FDP (26.92%), the SP (14.75%) and the SVP (11.98%). In the federal election, a total of 834 votes were cast, and the voter turnout was 45.0%.

In the 2007 Gran Consiglio election, there were a total of 1,897 registered voters in Muralto, of which 998 or 52.6% voted. 22 blank ballots and 4 null ballots were cast, leaving 972 valid ballots in the election. The most popular party was the PPD+GenGiova which received 291 or 29.9% of the vote. The next three most popular parties were; the PLRT (with 183 or 18.8%), the SSI (with 176 or 18.1%) and the PS (with 119 or 12.2%).

In the 2007 Consiglio di Stato election, 15 blank ballots and 7 null ballots were cast, leaving 976 valid ballots in the election. The most popular party was the PPD which received 280 or 28.7% of the vote. The next three most popular parties were; the LEGA (with 165 or 16.9%), the PLRT (with 160 or 16.4%) and the SSI (with 159 or 16.3%).

== Economy ==
As of 2007, Muralto had an unemployment rate of 6.52%. As of 2005, there were 2 people employed in the primary economic sector and about 1 business involved in this sector. 53 people were employed in the secondary sector and there were 15 businesses in this sector. 1,199 people were employed in the tertiary sector, with 215 businesses in this sector. There were 1,123 residents of the municipality who were employed in some capacity, of which females made up 43.4% of the workforce.

In 2000, there were 1,162 workers who commuted into the municipality and 738 workers who commuted away. The municipality is a net importer of workers, with about 1.6 workers entering the municipality for every one leaving. About 5.3% of the workforce coming into Muralto are coming from outside Switzerland. Of the working population, 12.5% used public transportation to get to work, and 42.2% used a private car.

As of 2009, there were 18 hotels in Muralto with a total of 463 rooms and 824 beds.

== Religion ==
From the 2000 census, 1,713 or 64.0% were Roman Catholic, while 365 or 13.6% belonged to the Swiss Reformed Church. There are 464 individuals (or about 17.34% of the population) who belong to another church (not listed on the census), and 134 individuals (or about 5.01% of the population) did not answer the question.

== Education ==
In Muralto about 61.1% of the population (between age 25–64) have completed either non-mandatory upper secondary education or additional higher education (either university or a scuola universitaria professionale).

In Muralto there were a total of 314 students (as of 2009). The Ticino education system provides up to three years of non-mandatory kindergarten and in Muralto there were 39 children in kindergarten. The primary school program lasts for five years and includes both a standard school and a special school. In the village, 104 students attended the standard primary schools and 5 students attended the special school. In the lower secondary school system, students either attend a two-year middle school followed by a two-year pre-apprenticeship or they attend a four-year program to prepare for higher education. There were 79 students in the two-year middle school and 2 in their pre-apprenticeship, while 40 students were in the four-year advanced program.

The upper secondary school includes several options, but at the end of the upper secondary program, a student will be prepared to enter a trade or to continue on to a university or college. In Ticino, vocational students may either attend school while working on their internship or apprenticeship (which takes three or four years) or may attend school followed by an internship or apprenticeship (which takes one year as a full-time student or one and a half to two years as a part-time student). There were 15 vocational students who were attending school full-time and 25 who attend part-time.

The professional program lasts three years and prepares a student for a job in engineering, nursing, computer science, business, tourism and similar fields. There were 5 students in the professional program.

As of 2000, there were 5 students in Muralto who came from another municipality, while 219 residents attended schools outside the municipality.

== Notable people ==
- Franco Forini (born 1958), racing driver
