= Hans Konrad von Orelli =

Hans Conrad von Orelli may refer to:

- Hans Conrad von Orelli (1714) (1714–1785), Swiss publisher and politician
- Hans Conrad von Orelli (1770) (1770–1826), Swiss civil servant and classical scholar
- Hans Konrad von Orelli (1846) (1846–1912), Swiss theologian and professor
- Hans Conrad von Orelli (officer) (1853–1904), Swiss military officer and colonel
