= Orelli =

The name Orelli can refer to several different people:

- Orelli family, a Swiss noble family attested in Locarno since the 12th century
- Carlo Orelli (1894–2005) was, until his death, the oldest living Italian veteran of World War I
- Giovanni Orelli (1928–2016), a Swiss poet and writer
- Johann Caspar von Orelli (1787–1849), a Swiss classical scholar
- Johann Conrad Orelli (1770–1826), the cousin to the preceding, and also a classics scholar
- Hans Konrad von Orelli (1846–1912), a Swiss theologian
- Susanna Orelli-Rinderknecht (1845–1939), a Swiss temperance activist
