= Johann Melchior Aloys von Orelli =

Swiss merchant and textile exporter

- Born: 1543; Locarno
- Died: 31 October 1623; Zürich
- Citizenship: Zürich (from 1592, not full citizen)
- Occupation: Merchant
- Spouse: Virginia von Muralt
- Parent: Aloisio Orelli
- Family: Orelli family

Johann Melchior Aloys von Orelli (1543 – 31 October 1623) was a Swiss merchant and pioneer of Zürich's textile export trade to northern Italy. He was a member of the Reformed faith and became a citizen of Zürich in 1592, though not with full rights.

== Early life and family ==
Johann Melchior Aloys von Orelli was born in 1543 in Locarno. He was the son of Aloisio Orelli and married Virginia von Muralt, daughter of Martino Muralto. As a merchant, he was a member of the Saffron guild in Zürich.

== Career ==
Orelli was a pioneer of Zürich's textile export trade to northern Italy. By 1578 at the latest, he operated one of Zürich's largest businesses in raw cotton cloth and trellis fabric together with his brother Franz. The business dealt in unfinished cotton textiles and related products for export to the Italian market.

In addition to his open commercial activities, Orelli secretly participated in the manufacturing of fustian and bombazine operated by Caspar Wüst. This manufacturing activity was prohibited for refugees at the time, making his involvement clandestine.

== Bibliography ==
- Pfister, U. Die Zürcher Fabriques, 1992
