= Crescent =

Symbol of a lunar phase

Crescent

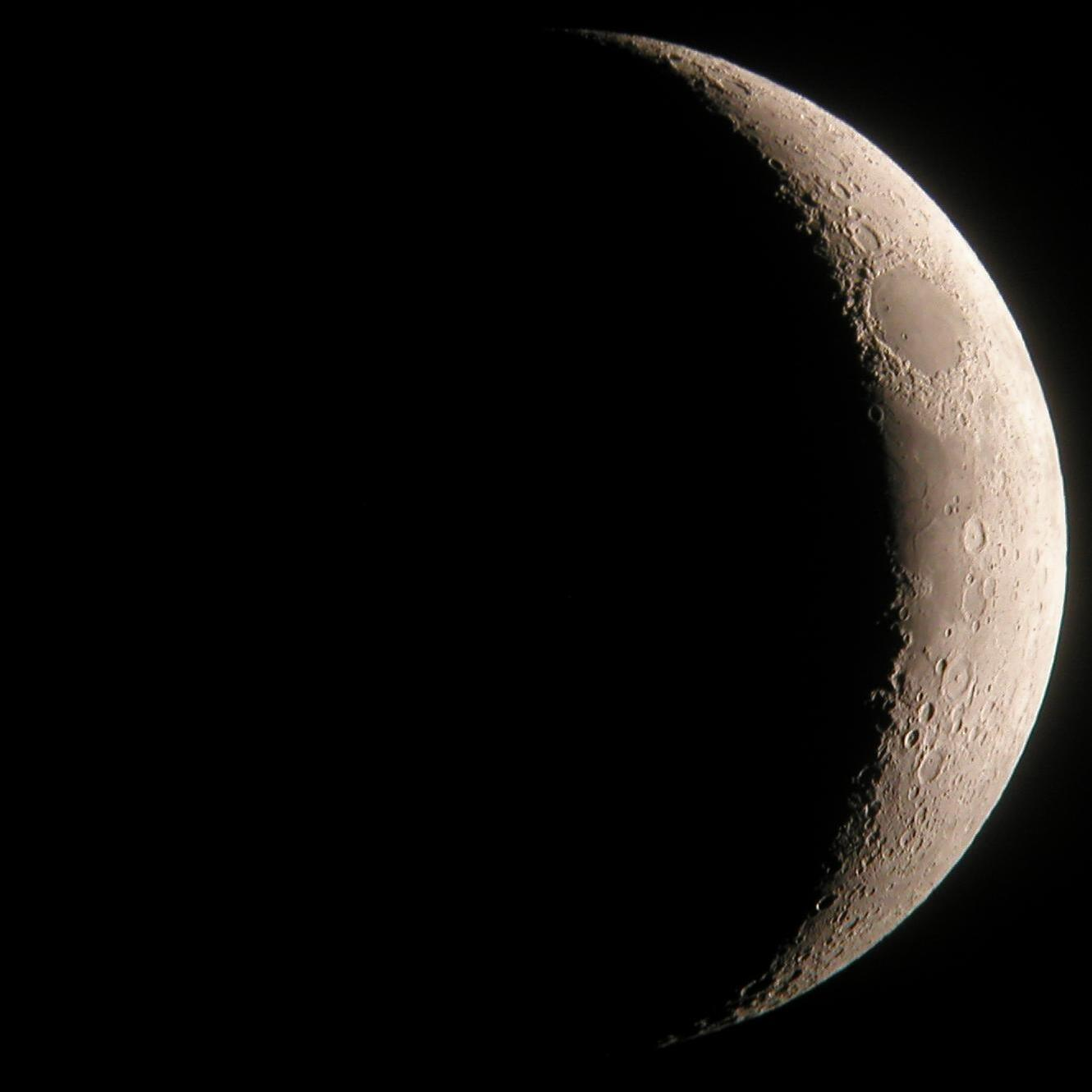
Waxing crescent moon

open crescent (Note: On an open crescent the tips are polar opposites on the orb of the moon.)

closing crescent (Note: A closing crescent is made by removing the overlapping part of a smaller circle from a larger circle.)

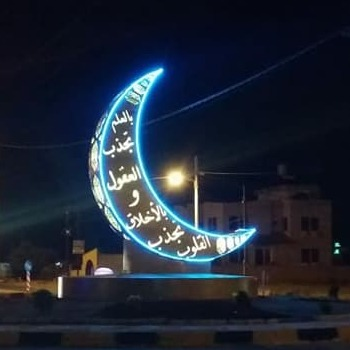
Islamic crescent art in roundabout

A crescent shape (/ˈkrɛsənt/, UK also /ˈkrɛzənt/) is a symbol or emblem used to represent the lunar phase (as it appears in the northern hemisphere) in the first quarter (the "sickle moon"), or by extension a symbol representing the Moon itself.

In Hindu iconography, Shiva is often shown wearing a crescent moon on his head, symbolising his control over time, as well as his attributes of both creation and destruction.

It is used as the astrological symbol for the Moon, and hence as the alchemical symbol for silver. It was also the emblem of Diana/Artemis, and hence represented virginity. In veneration of Mary in the Catholic Church, it is associated with Mary, mother of Jesus.

From its use as roof finial in Ottoman mosques, it has also become associated with Islam, and the crescent was introduced as chaplain badge for Muslim United States military chaplains in 1993.

== Symbolism ==
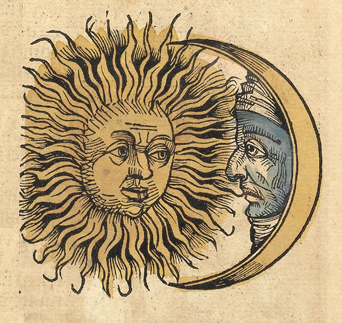
Sun and Moon with faces (1493 woodcut)

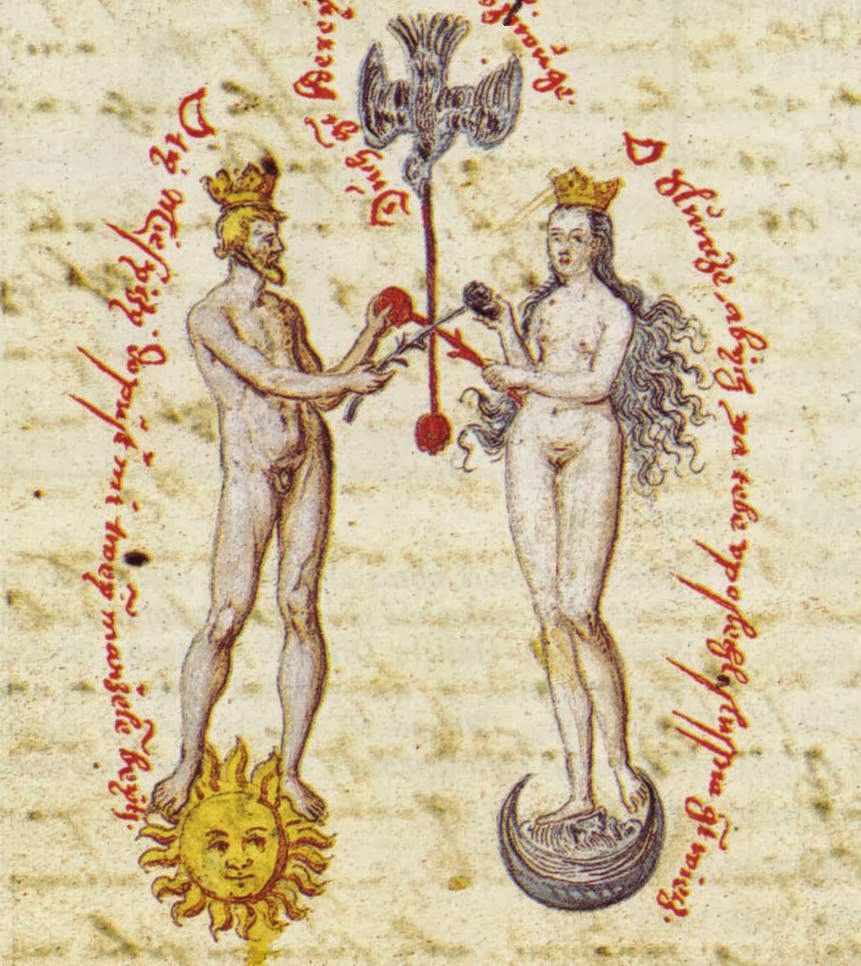
Hierosgamos of Sun and Moon in a 16th-century alchemical manuscript

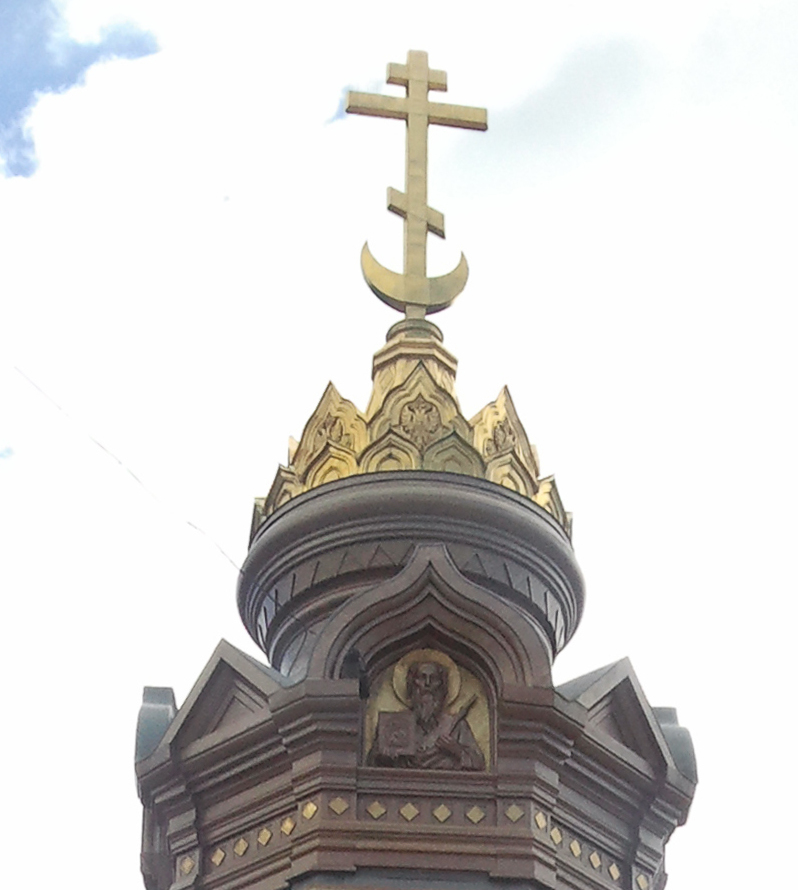
Cross over crescent on Plevna Chapel in Moscow

The crescent symbol is primarily used to represent the Moon, not necessarily in a particular lunar phase. When used to represent a waxing or waning lunar phase, "crescent" or "increscent" refers to the waxing first quarter, while the symbol representing the waning final quarter is called "decrescent".

=== Astrology ===
The crescent symbol was long used as a symbol of the Moon in astrology, and by extension of Silver (as the corresponding metal) in alchemy. The astrological use of the symbol is attested in early Greek papyri containing horoscopes.

=== Paganism ===
In the 2nd-century Bianchini's planisphere, the personification of the Moon is shown with a crescent attached to her headdress. Its ancient association with Ishtar/Astarte and Diana is preserved in the Moon (as symbolised by a crescent) representing the female principle (as juxtaposed with the Sun representing the male principle), and (Artemis-Diana being a virgin goddess) especially virginity and female chastity.

=== Christianity ===
In Christian symbolism, the crescent entered Marian iconography, by the association of Mary with the Woman of the Apocalypse (described with "the moon under her feet, and on her head a crown of twelve stars" in Revelation) The most well known representation of Mary as the Woman of the Apocalypse is the Virgin of Guadalupe.

==== Eastern Orthodoxy ====
On the domes of certain Eastern Orthodox churches, particularly Russian Orthodox ones, there appears a cross over a crescent. This symbolises Jesus Christ as two of the threefold office, the King and High Priest. It is sometimes mistakenly taken as a symbol of the victory of Christianity over Islam, but it has nothing to do with it nor Islam at all, as domes featuring the cross-over-crescent design were constructed in medieval Russia in the 12th century, prior to the arrival of Islam in Kievan Rus'.

== Shape ==
Examples of lunes in planar geometry (shaded areas). Examples in the top row can be considered crescent shapes, because the lune does not contain the center of the original (right-most) circular disk.

An astronomically correct crescent shape (shaded area), complemented by a gibbous shape (unshaded area).

The crescent shape is a type of lune, the latter consisting of a circular disk with a portion of another disk removed from it, so that what remains is a shape enclosed by two circular arcs which intersect at two points. In a crescent, the enclosed shape does not include the center of the original disk.

The tapered regions towards the points of intersection of the two arcs are known as the "horns" of the crescent. The classical crescent shape has its horns pointing upward (and is often worn as horns when worn as a crown or diadem, e.g. in depictions of the lunar goddess, or in the headdress of Persian kings, etc.

The word crescent is derived etymologically from the present participle of the Latin verb crescere "to grow", technically denoting the waxing moon (luna crescens). As seen from the northern hemisphere, the waxing Moon tends to appear with its horns pointing towards the left, and conversely the waning Moon with its horns pointing towards the right; the English word crescent may however refer to the shape regardless of its orientation, except for the technical language of blazoning used in heraldry, where the word "increscent" refers to a crescent shape with its horns to the left, and "decrescent" refers to one with its horns to the right, while the word "crescent" on its own denotes a crescent shape with horns pointing upward.

The shape of the lit side of a spherical body (most notably the Moon) that appears to be less than half illuminated by the Sun as seen by the viewer appears in a different shape from what is generally termed a crescent in planar geometry: Assuming the terminator lies on a great circle, the crescent Moon will actually appear as the figure bounded by a half-ellipse and a half-circle, with the major axis of the ellipse coinciding with a diameter of the semicircle.

Unicode encodes a crescent (increscent) at U+263D (☽) and a decrescent at U+263E (☾). The Miscellaneous Symbols and Pictographs block provides variants with faces as emoji: U+1F31B 🌛 FIRST QUARTER MOON WITH FACE and U+1F31C 🌜 LAST QUARTER MOON WITH FACE.

== History ==
=== Early history ===
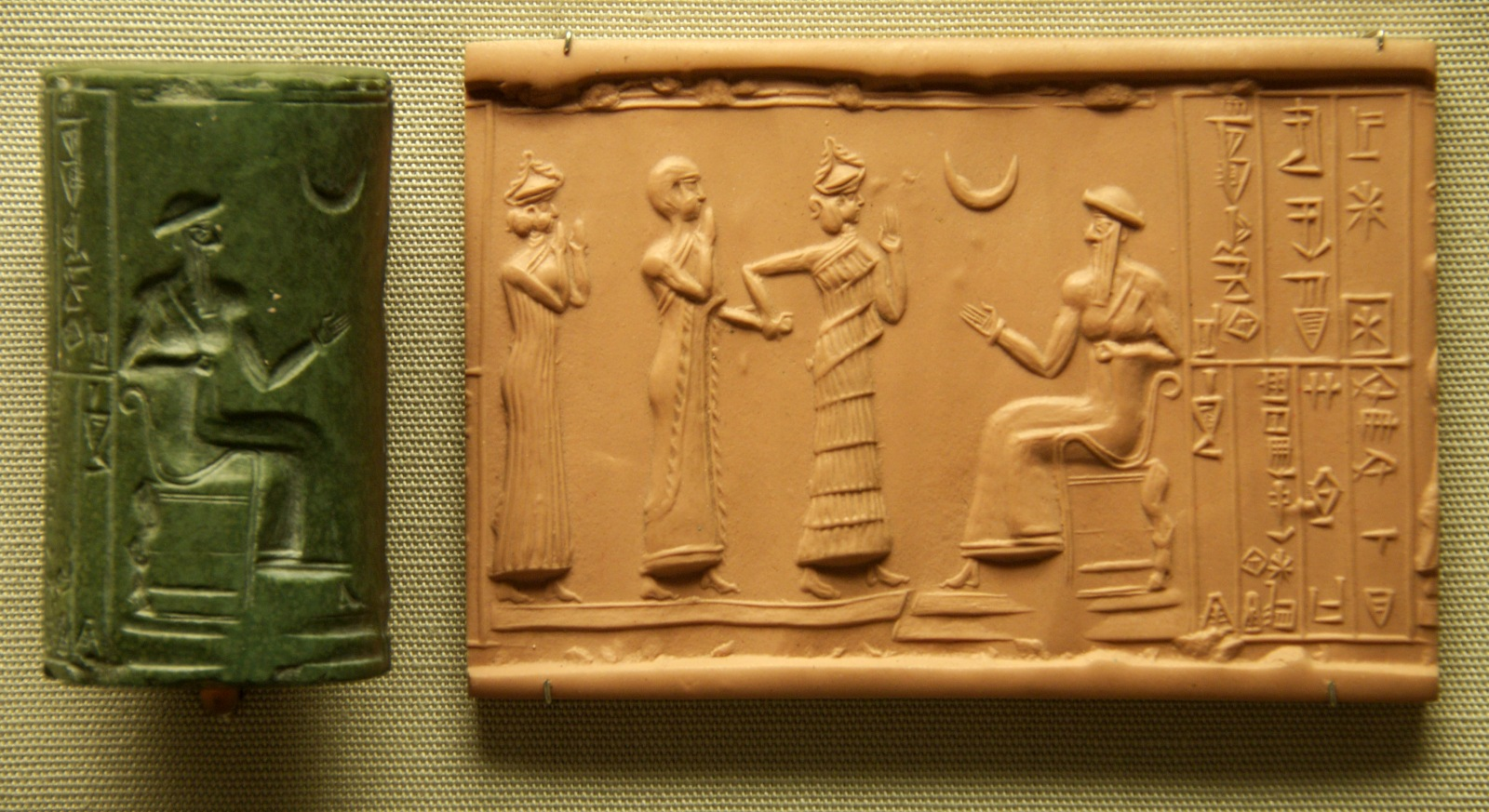
Sumerian cylinder seal, dated c. 2400 BC, showing the Moon god as a crescent symbol

The crescent shape is used to represent the Moon, and the Moon deity Nanna/Sin from an early time, visible in Akkadian cylinder seals as early as 2300 BC.

The Egyptian logograph representing the Moon also had a crescent shape 𓇹 (Gardiner N11, ı͗ꜥḥ "moon" (with increscent and decrescent variants); variant N12 𓇺). In addition, there is a 19th-dynasty hieroglyph representing the "moon with its lower half obscured (N9 𓇷 psḏ, with a variant with a crescent shape N10 𓇸).

The crescent was well used in the iconography of the ancient Near East and was used by the Phoenicians in the 8th century BC as far as Carthage and Numidia in modern Tunisia and Algeria. The crescent and star also appears on pre-Islamic coins of South Arabia.

The combination of star and crescent also arises in the ancient Near East, representing the Moon and Ishtar (the planet Venus), often combined into a triad with the solar disk. It was inherited both in Sassanian and Hellenistic iconography.

=== Classical antiquity ===
Selene, the moon goddess, was depicted with a crescent upon her head, often referred to as her horns, and a major identifying feature of hers in ancient works of art.

In the iconography of the Hellenistic period, the crescent became the symbol of Artemis-Diana, the virgin hunter goddess associated with the Moon. Numerous depictions show Artemis-Diana wearing the crescent Moon as part of her headdress. The related symbol of the star and crescent was the emblem of the Mithradates dynasty in the Kingdom of Pontus and was also used as the emblem of Byzantium.

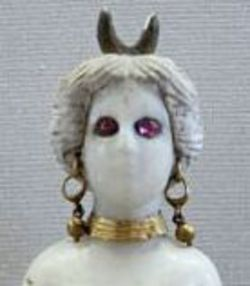
Astarte with horns, statuette from Seleucid-era Mesopotamia

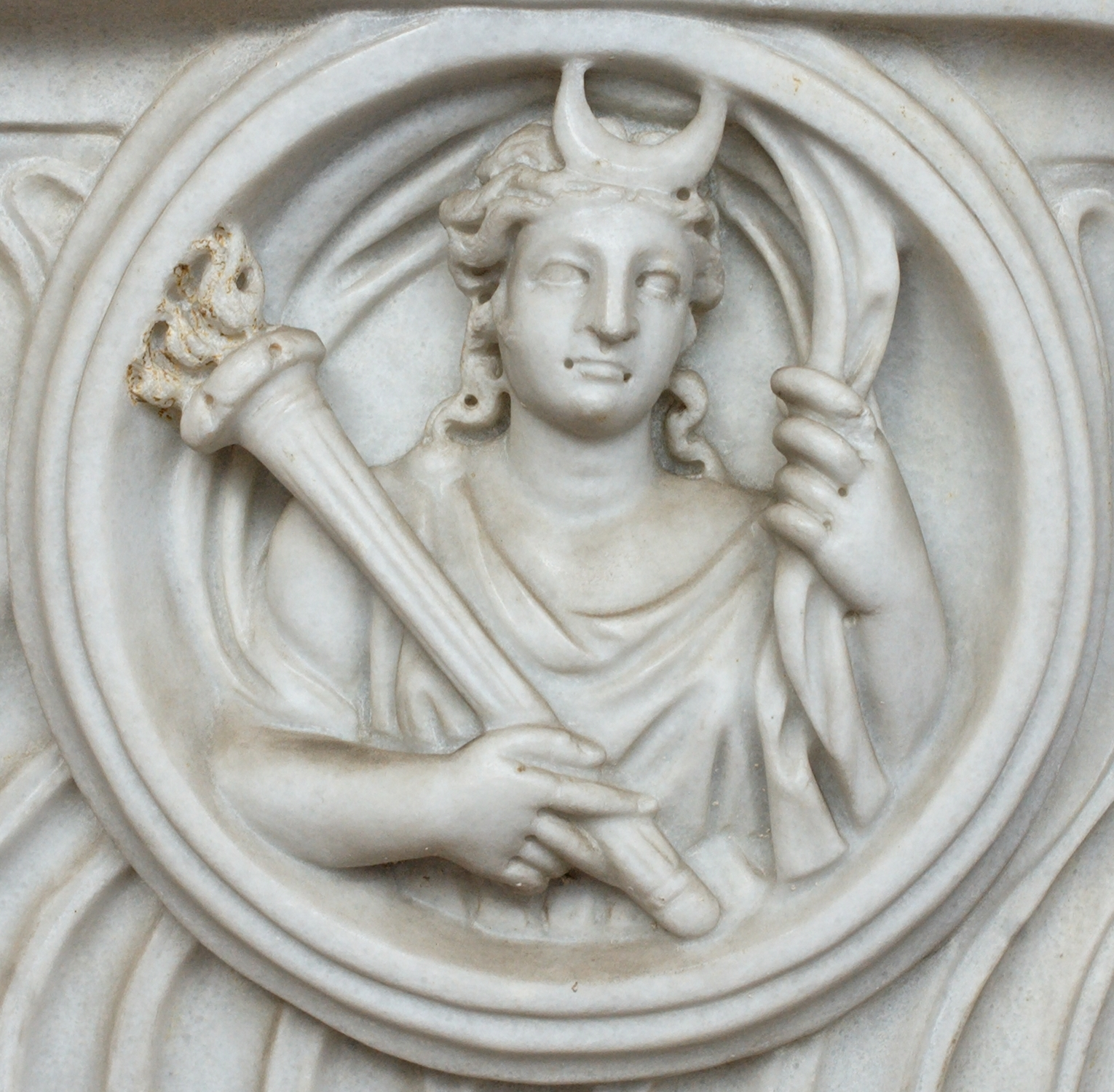
Bust of Selene on a Roman sarcophagus (3rd century)

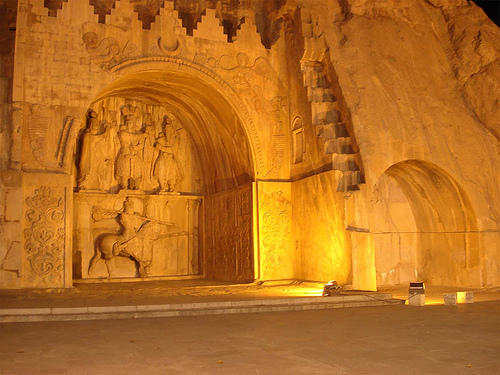
Taq-e Bostan, from the Sasanian Empire of the pre-Islamic era. Note the crescent above the arch.

=== Middle Ages ===
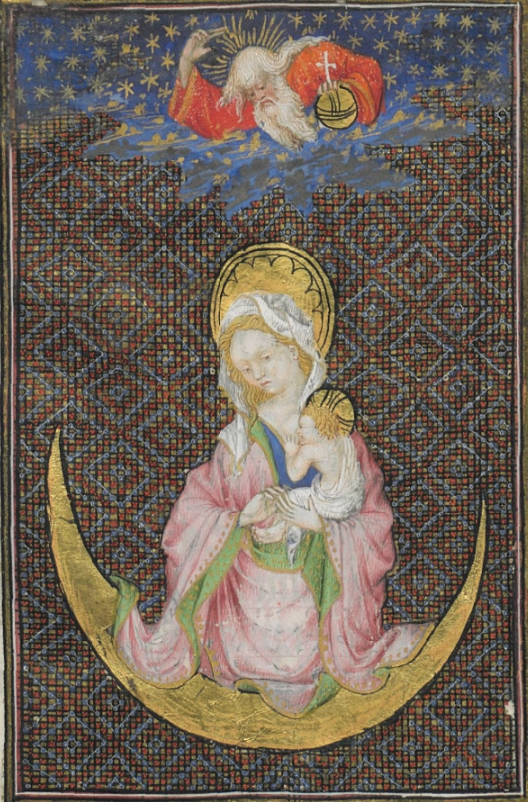
Miniature of Madonna on the crescent (Rohan Master, Hours of René of Anjou, 15th century)

Flag of the Golden Horde as shown in Angelino Dulcert's 1339 map

The City Flag of Portsmouth, derived from the Medieval arms of Isaac Komnenos of Cyprus.

Flag of the town of Azak today

Coat of Arms of the Mamluks of Egypt in Mecia de Viladestes map (1413)

Town arms of Drogheda, Ireland

The crescent remained in use as an emblem in the Sasanian Empire, used as a Zoroastrian regal or astrological symbol. In the Crusades it came to be associated with the Orient (the Byzantine Empire, the Levant and Outremer in general) and was widely used (often alongside a star) in Crusader seals and coins. It was used as a heraldic charge by the later 13th century. Isaac Komnenos of Cyprus, the claimant to the Byzantine Empire who ruled Cyprus until overthrown by the crusading King Richard I of England, used arms with "a crescent of gold on a shade of azure, with a blazing star of eight points". Later, King Richard granted the same as the coat of arms of the city of Portsmouth, in recognition of the significant involvement of soldiers, sailors, and vessels from Portsmouth in the conquest of Cyprus. This remains Portsmouth's coat of arms up to the present.

Anna Notaras, daughter of the last megas doux of the Byzantine Empire Loukas Notaras, after the fall of Constantinople and her emigration to Italy, made a seal with her coat of arms which included "two lions holding above the crescent a cross or a sword".

From its use in the Sasanian Empire, the crescent also found its way into Islamic iconography after the Muslim conquest of Persia. Umar is said to have hung two crescent-shaped ornaments captured from the Sasanian capital of Ctesiphon in the Kaaba. The crescent also became the symbol of the Umayyad Caliphate. The crescent appears to have been adopted as an emblem on military flags by the Islamic armies from at least the 13th century, although the scholarly consensus holds that the widespread use of the crescent in Islam develops later, during the 14th to 15th century. The use of such flags is reflected in the 14th-century Libro del Conoscimiento and the Catalan Atlas. Examples include the flags attributed to Gabes, Tlemcen, Tunis and Buda, Nubia/Dongola (documented by Angelino Dulcert in 1339) and the Mamluks of Egypt.

The Roman Catholic fashion of depicting Madonna standing or sitting on a crescent develops in the 15th century.

=== Early modern and modern ===
Coat of Arms of Mayotte

An Ottoman war banner in green

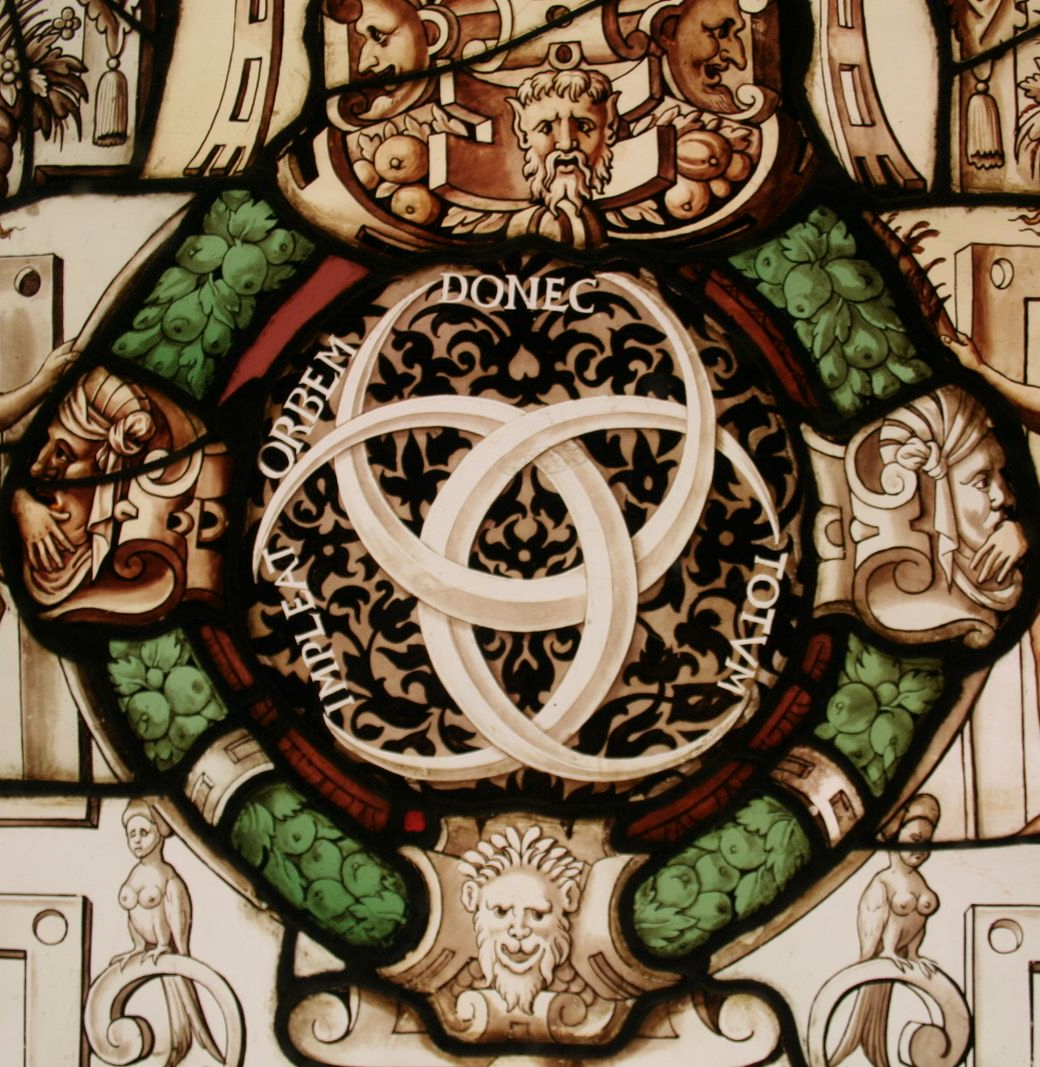
Triple crescent badge of Henry II of France (d. 1559), Château d'Écouen

Coat of Arms of the Regency of Algiers (1630–1830)

The goddess Diana was associated with the Moon in classical mythology. In reference to this, feminine jewelry representing crescents, especially diadems, became popular in the early modern period. The tarot card of the "Popess" also wears a crescent on her head.

Conrad Grünenberg in his Pilgrimage to the Holy Land (1486) consistently depicts cities in the Holy Land with crescent finials. Flags with crescents appear to have been used on Ottoman vessels since at least the 16th century.

Prints depicting the Battle of Lepanto (1571), including the print by Agostino Barberigo of Rome made just a few weeks after the battle, and the Martino Rota of Venice in the following year, show the Ottoman vessels displaying flags with one or several crescents in various orientations (as do the monumental paintings commissioned later based on these prints). Rota also shows numerous crescent finials, both on ships and on fortresses depicted in the background, as well as some finials with stars or suns radiant, and in some cases a sun radiant combined with a crescent in the star-and-crescent configuration.

The official adoption of star and crescent as the Ottoman state symbol started during the reign of Sultan Mustafa III (1757–1774) and its use became well-established during Sultan Abdul Hamid I (1774–1789) and Sultan Selim III (1789–1807) periods. A buyruldu (decree) from 1793 states that the ships in the Ottoman navy have that flag.

Muhammad Ali, who became Pasha of Egypt in 1805, introduced the first national flag of Egypt, red with three white crescents, each accompanied by a white star.

The association of the crescent with the Ottoman Empire appears to have resulted in a gradual association of the crescent shape with Islam in the 20th century. A Red Crescent appears to have been used as a replacement of the Red Cross as early as in the Russo-Turkish War of 1877/8, and it was officially adopted in 1929.

While some Islamic organisations since the 1970s have embraced the crescent as their logo or emblem (e.g. Crescent International magazine, established 1980), some Muslim publications tend to emphasize that the interpretation of the crescent, historically used on the banners of Muslim armies, as a "religious symbol" of Islam was an error made by the "Christians of Europe". The identification of the crescent as an "Islamic symbol" is mentioned by James Hastings as a "common error" to which "even approved writers on Oriental subjects" are prone as early as 1928.

The crescent was used on a flag of the American Revolutionary War and was called the Liberty (or Moultrie) Flag.

The symbol of the Triple Goddess is a circle flanked by a left facing and right facing crescent, which represents a maiden, mother and crone archetype. The biohazard symbol bears peculiar resemblance to the triple crescent badge of Henry II of France.

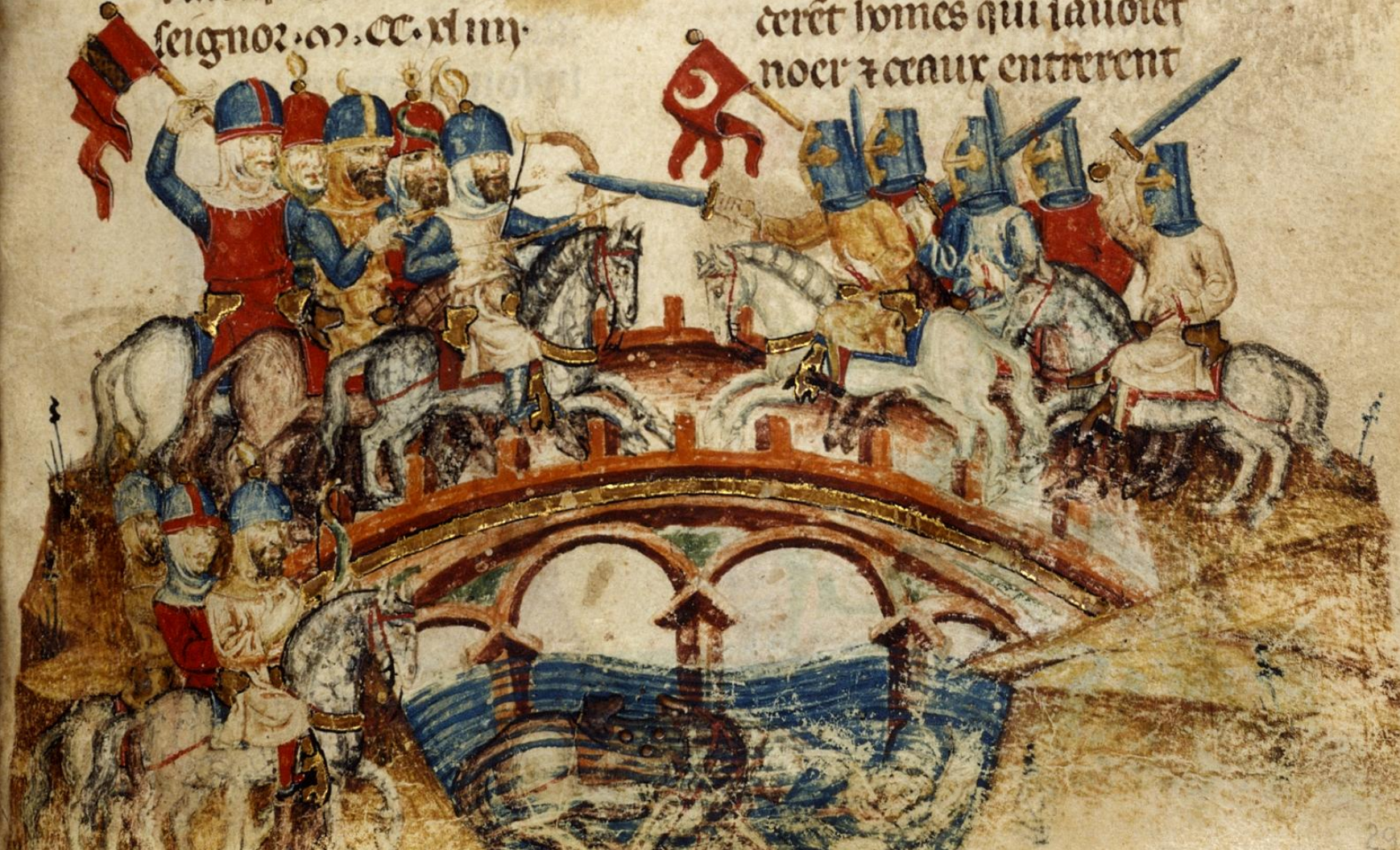
A depiction of the Battle of Mohi (1241) between Mongols on the left and Magyars on the right

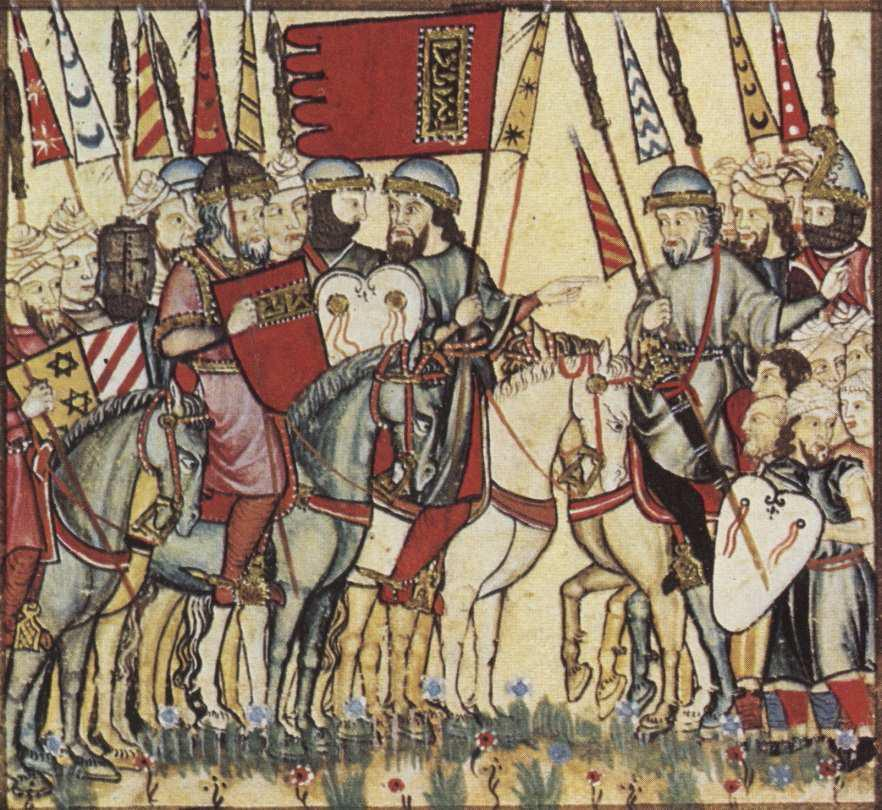
Muhammad I of Granada leading his troops during the Mudéjar revolt of 1264–66, illustrated in the contemporary Cantigas de Santa Maria

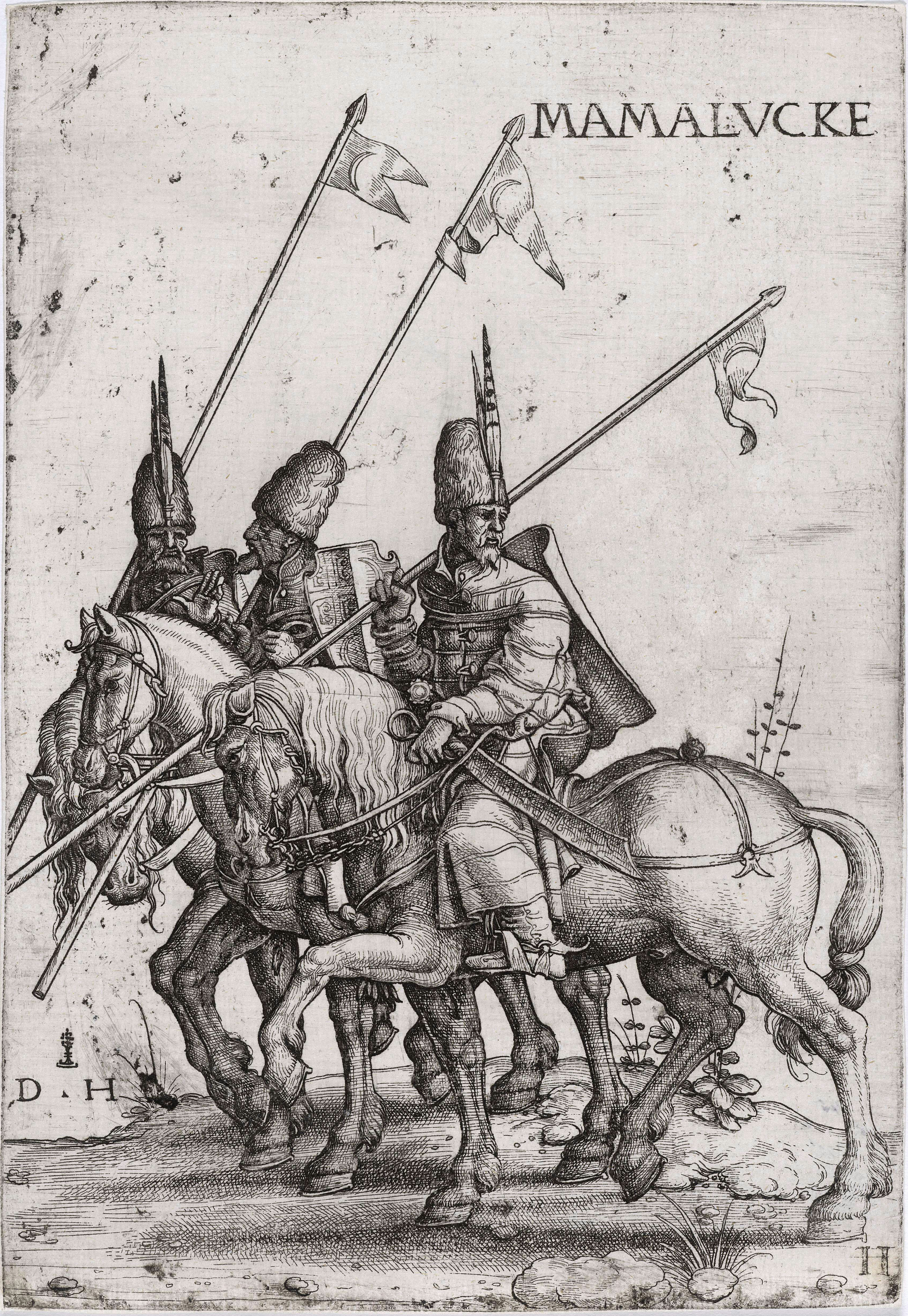
Mamluk lancers, early 16th century (etching by Daniel Hopfer)

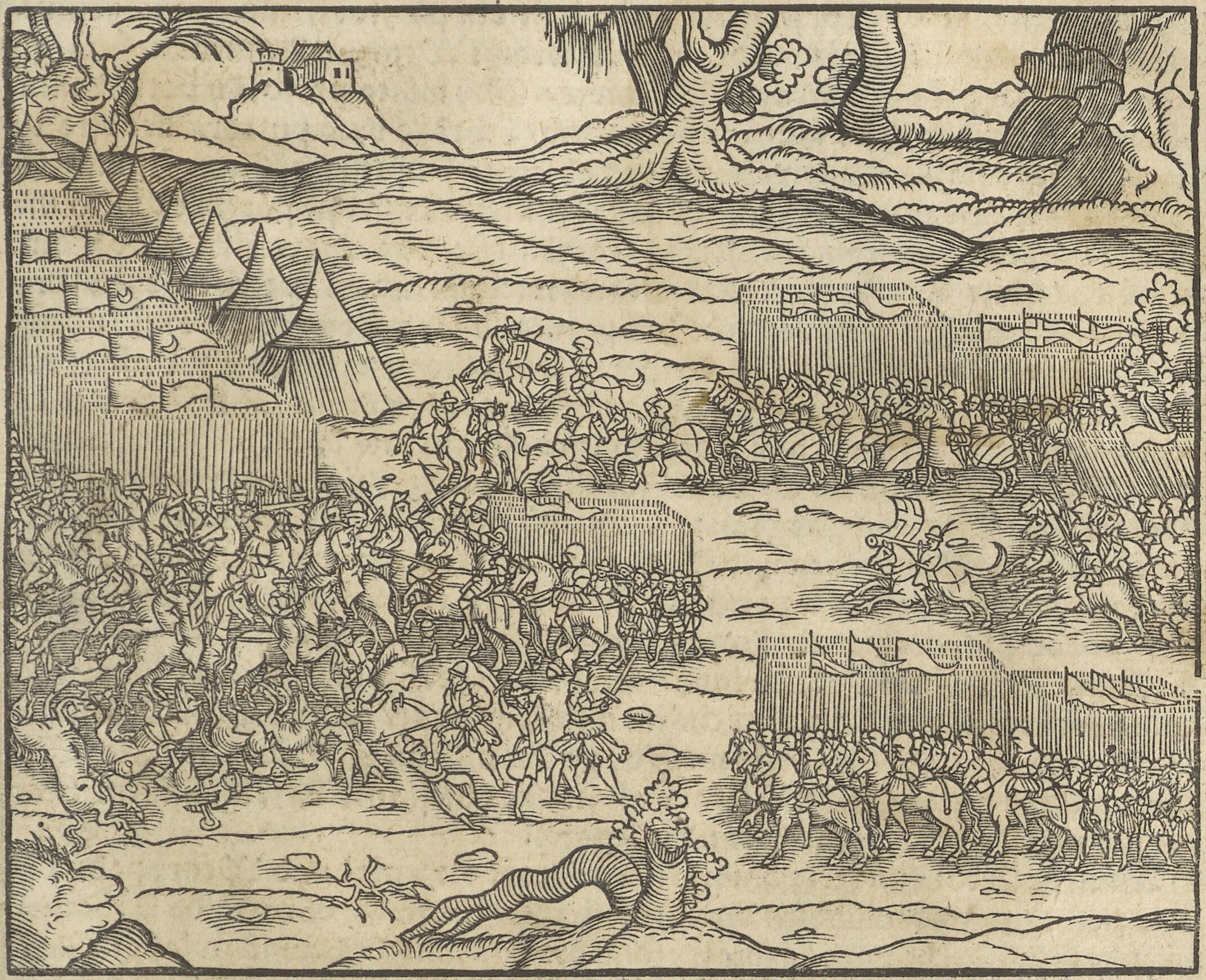
A scene from the Battle of Varna (1444) on the Kronika wszystkiego świata of Marcin Bielski (1564)

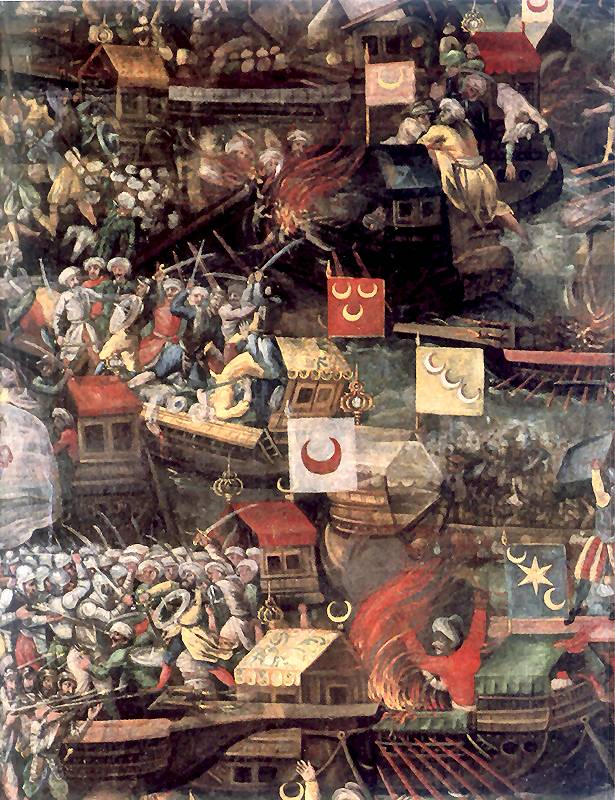
The painting of the 1571 Battle of Lepanto by Tommaso Dolabella (c. 1632) shows a variety of naval flags with crescents attributed to the Ottoman Empire

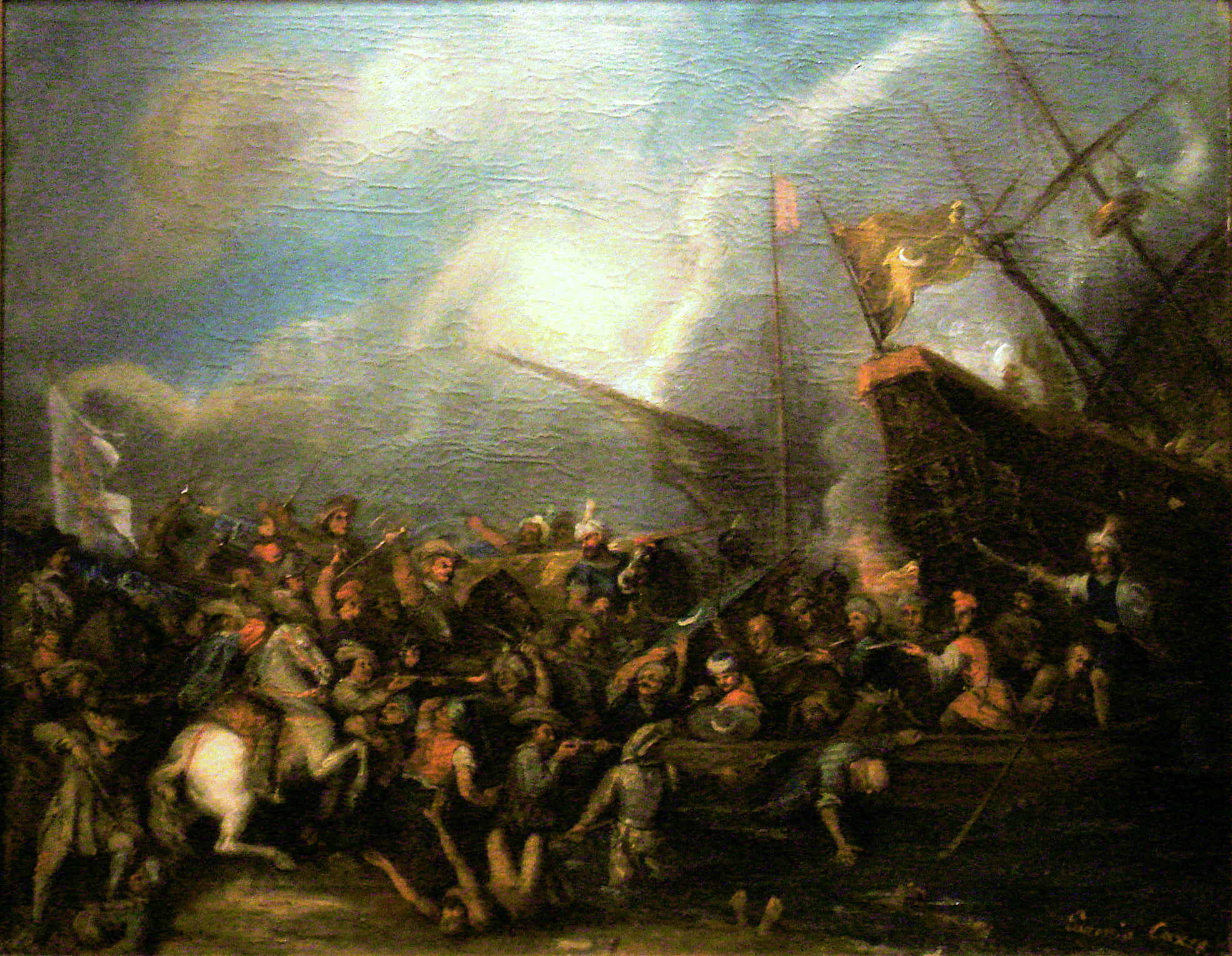
Turgut Reis landing on Malta, by Eugenio Caxes (1575-1634), Istanbul Naval Museum

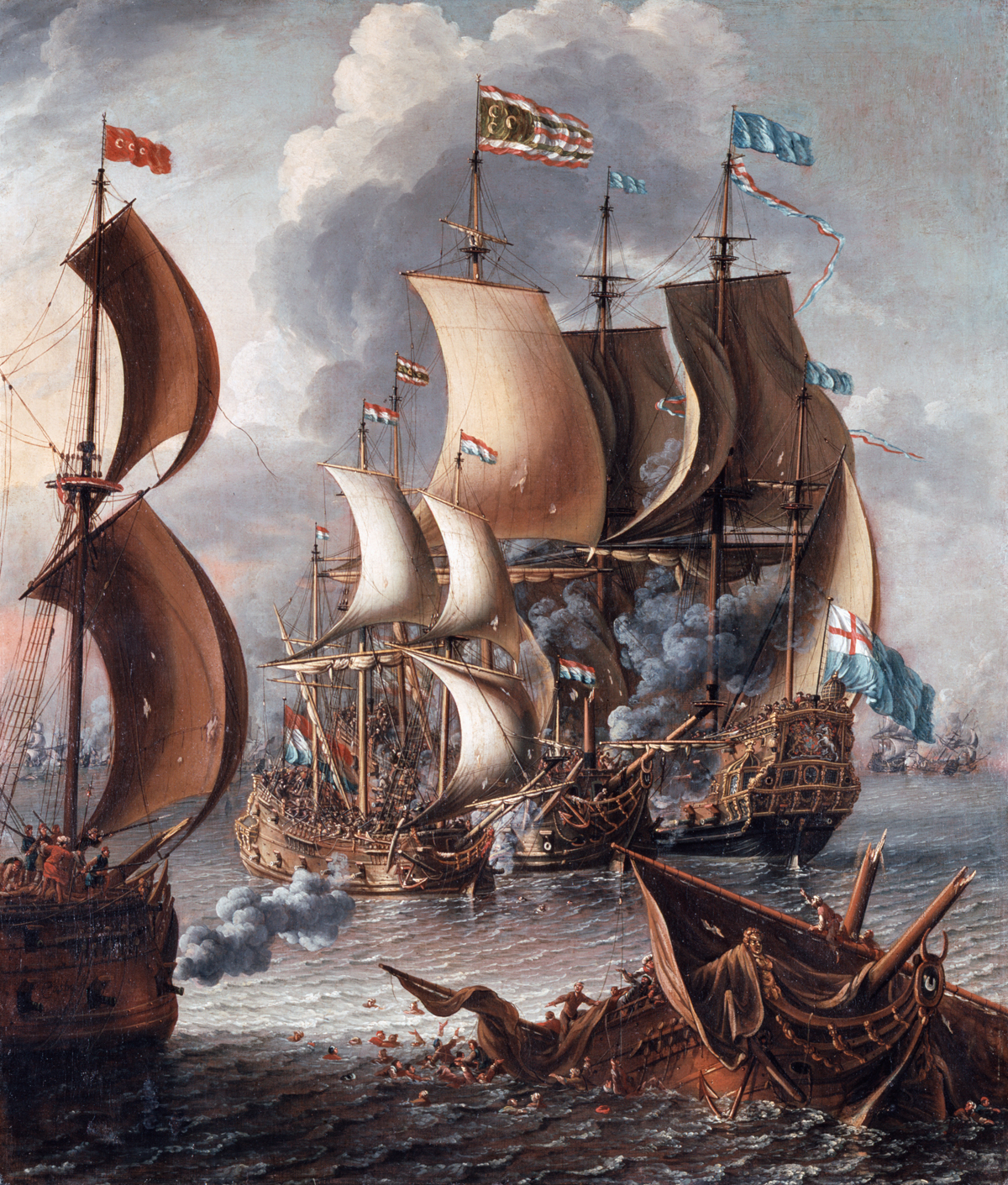
A naval battle painting of the Barbary state of Ottoman Algiers titled A Sea Fight with Barbary Corsairs by Laureys a Castro, c. 1681

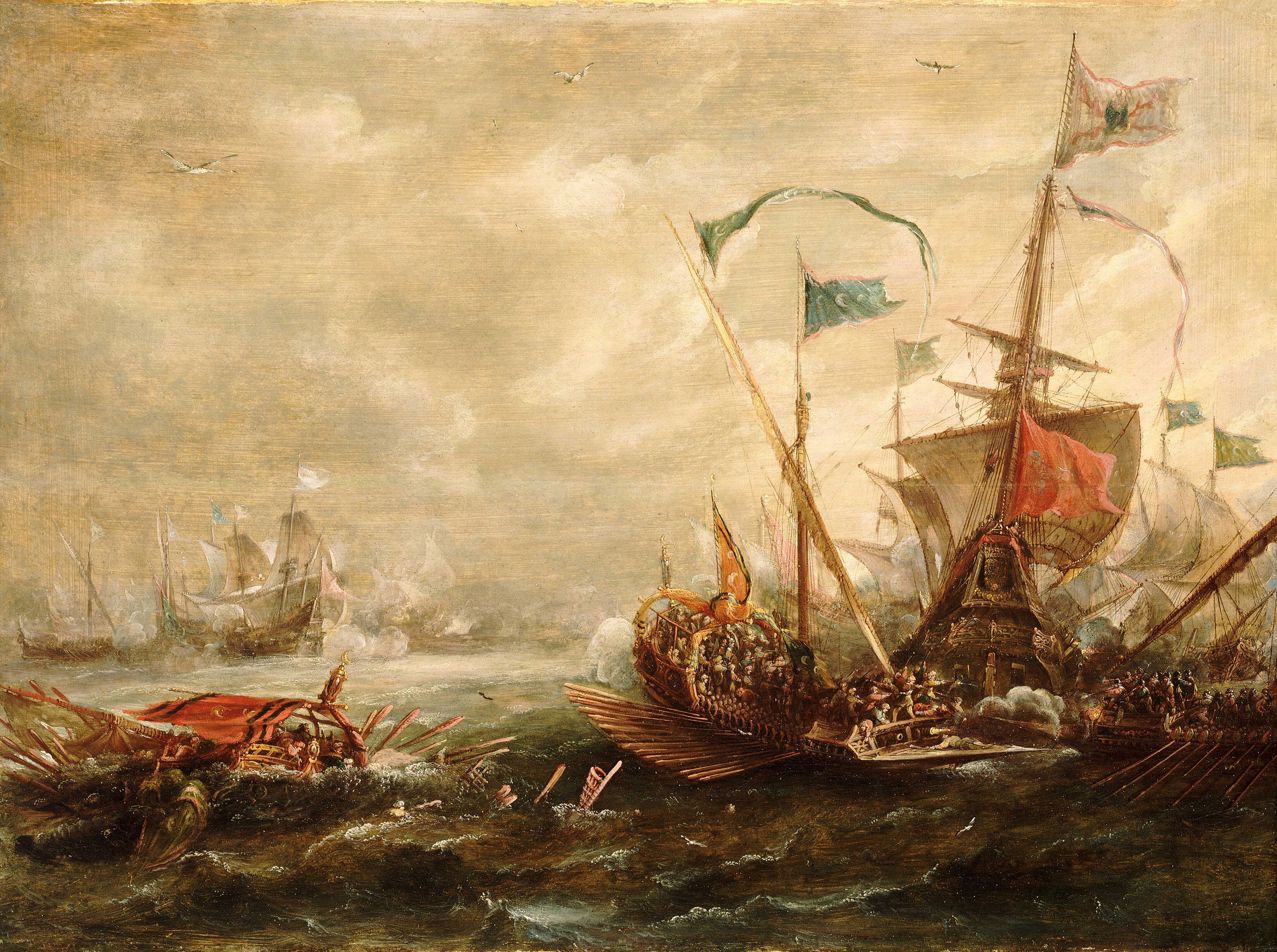
Spanish engagement with Barbary pirates, 17th century, Royal Museums Greenwich

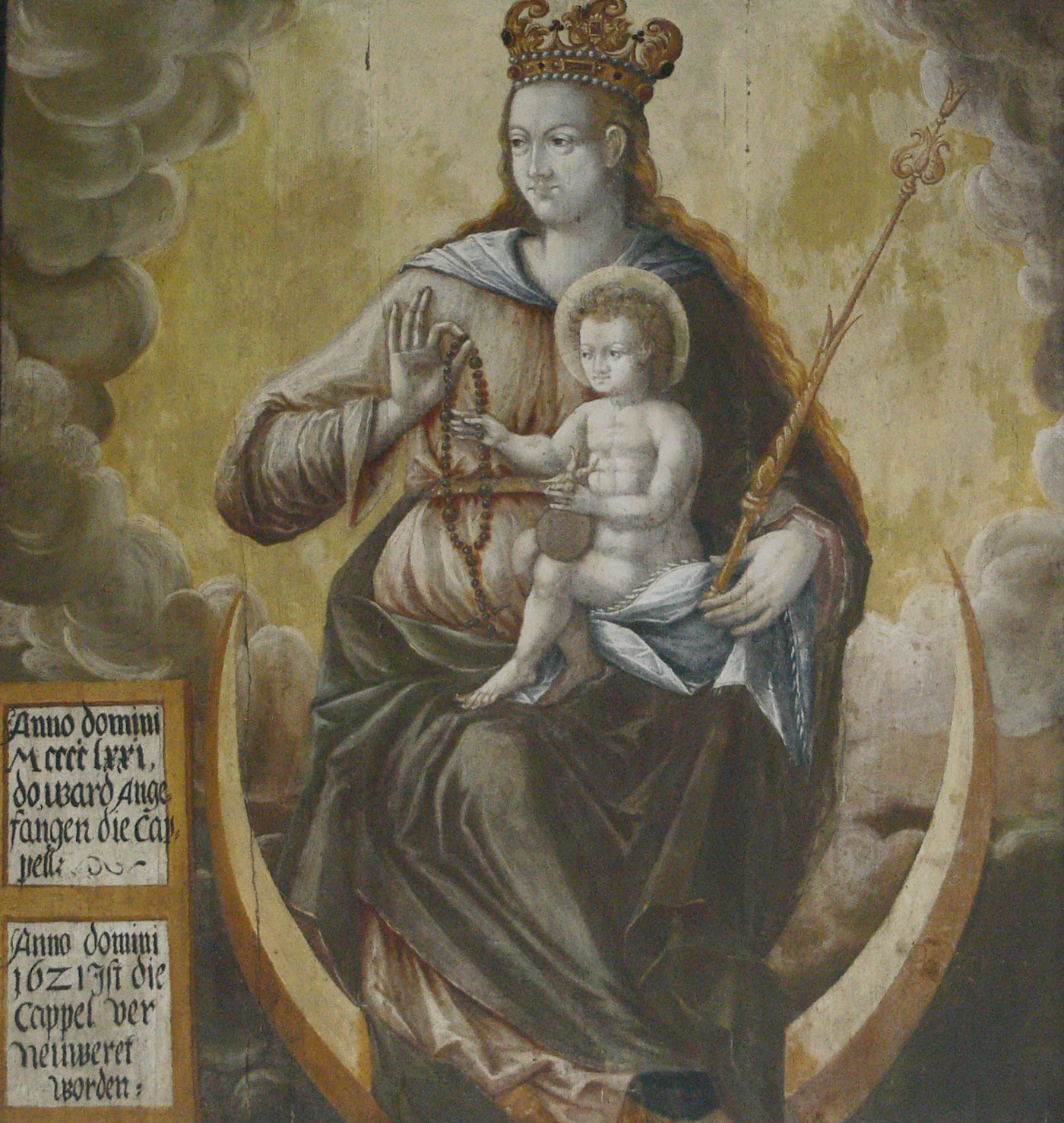
Madonna on the crescent, Bad Waldsee church (17th century)

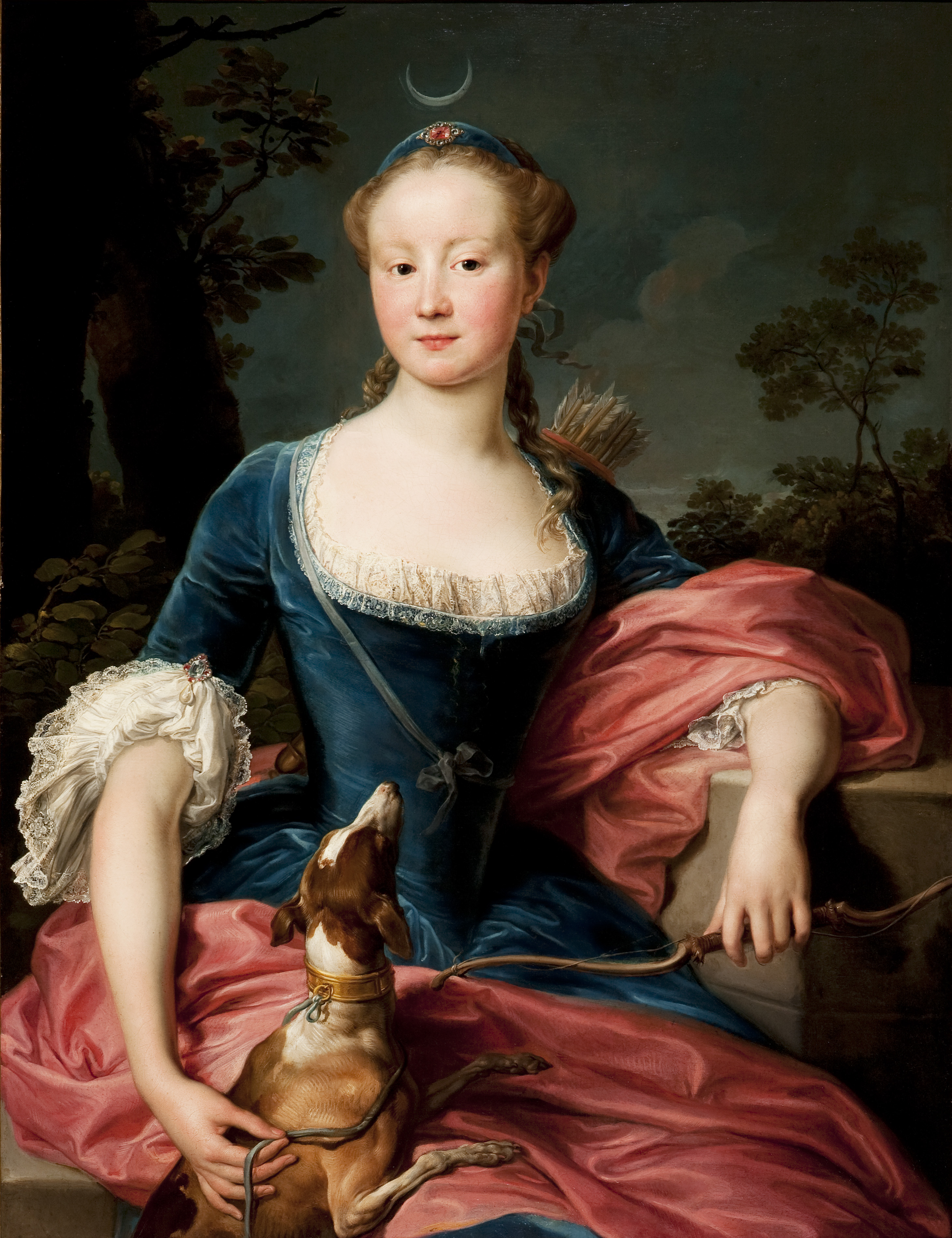
Portrait of a Lady as Diana by Pompeo Batoni (1760s)

Symbol of the Triple Goddess

A circle with an upward facing crescent representing the Wiccan Horned God

== Heraldry ==
The crescent has been used as a heraldic charge since the 13th century. In heraldic terminology, the term "crescent" when used alone refers to a crescent with the horns pointing upward. A crescent with the horns pointing left (dexter) is called "a crescent increscent" (or simply "an increscent"), and when the horns are pointing right (sinister), it is called "a crescent decrescent" (or "a decrescent"). A crescent with horns pointing down is called "a crescent reversed". Two crescents with horns pointing away from each other are called "addorsed". Siebmachers Wappenbuch (1605) has 48 coats of arms with one or more crescents, for example:

- Azure, a crescent moon argent pierced by an arrow fesswise Or all between in chief three mullets of six points and in base two mullets of six points argent (von Hagen, p. 176);
- Azure, an increscent and a decrescent addorsed Or (von Stoternheim, p. 146);
- Per pale Or and sable, a crescent moon and in chief three mullets of six points counterchanged (von Bodenstein, p. 182).

In English heraldry, the crescent is used as a difference denoting a second son.

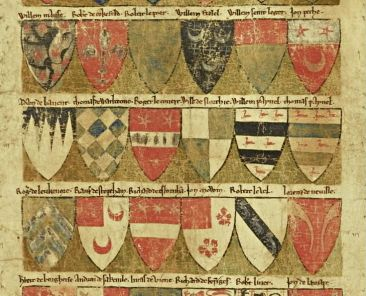
Three examples of coats of arms with crescents from the Dering Roll (c. 1270): No. 118: Willem FitzLel (sable crusily and three crescents argent); no. 120: John Peche (gules, a crescent or, on a chief argent two mullets gules); no. 128: Rauf de Stopeham (argent, two (of three) crescents and a canton gules).

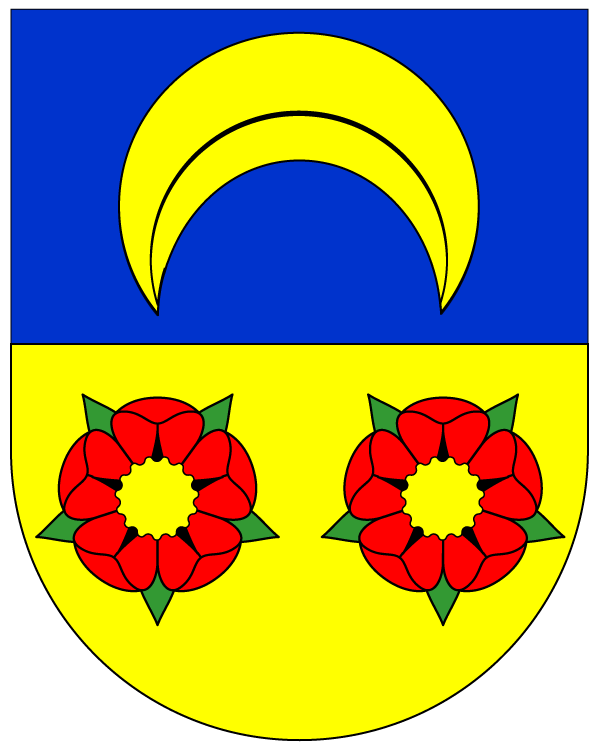
Coat of arms of the Neuamt bailiwick of Zürich (16th century). Its reversed crescent was taken up in the 20th-century municipal coats of arms of Niederglatt, Neerach and Stadel (canton of Zürich).

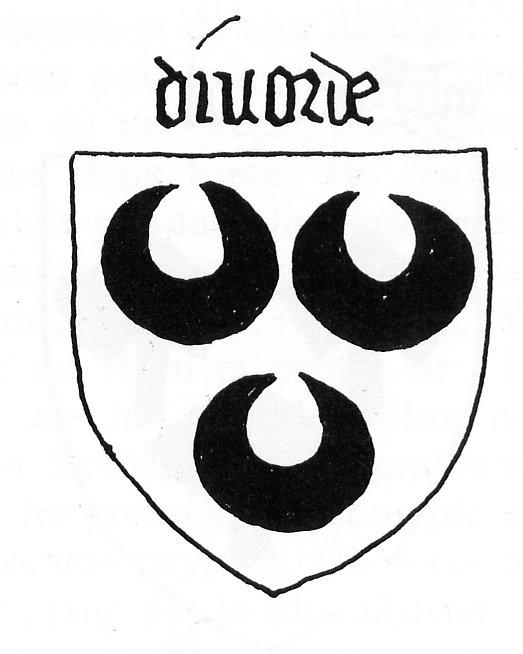
This coat of arms of the Divorde family (Holland and Brabant), around 1440, shows three crescents.

Inverted crescent on Polish coat of arms.

== Contemporary use ==
The crescent remains in use as astrological symbol and astronomical symbol representing the Moon. Use of a standalone crescent in flags is less common than the star and crescent combination. Crescents without stars are found in the South Carolina state flag (1861), the flag of Maldives (1965), the flag of the Organisation of Islamic Cooperation (1981) and the flag of the Arab League.

New Orleans is nicknamed "the Crescent City", and a crescent (or crescent and star) is used to represent the city in official emblems.

Crescents, often with faces, are found on numerous modern municipal coats of arms in Europe, e.g. France: Katzenthal, Mortcerf; Germany: Bönnigheim, Dettighofen, Dogern, Jesenwang, Karstädt, Michelfeld (Angelbachtal), Waldbronn, Comoros; Italy: Province of Agrigento; Malta: Qormi; Sweden: Trosa; Switzerland: Boswil, Dättlikon, Neerach (from the 16th-century Neuamt coat of arms).

The crescent printed on military ration boxes is the US Department of Defense symbol for subsistence items. The symbol is used on packaged foodstuffs but not on fresh produce or on items intended for resale.

Since 1993, the crescent has also been in use as chaplain badge for Muslim chaplains in the US military.

Flag of South Carolina (1861)

Flag of Maldives (1965)

The emblem of the International Red Cross and Red Crescent Movement around the world

Symbol of the Nationalist Movement Party of Turkey

The Dreamliner logo is painted on many Boeing 787s

Coat of arms of the 1st-54 Regulares Battalion "Tetuán" (Spanish Army)

== Other things called "crescent" ==
The Fertile Crescent

The term crescent may also refer to objects with a shape reminiscent of the crescent shape, such as houses forming an arc, a type of solitaire game, Crescent Nebula, glomerular crescent (crescent shaped scar of the glomeruli of the kidney), the Fertile Crescent (the fertile area of land between Mesopotamia and Egypt roughly forming a crescent shape), and the croissant (the French form of the word) for the crescent-shaped pastry.

== See also ==
- Star and crescent
- Barkhan dune
- Lune (mathematics)
- Astronomical symbols
- Astrological symbols
- Lunar phase
