= Hans Heinrich von Orelli =

18th-century Zurich merchant and mayor

Mayor of Zurich
- In office 1778–1785

Personal details
- Born: 10 November 1715 Zurich, Old Swiss Confederacy
- Died: 4 July 1785 (aged 69) Zurich, Old Swiss Confederacy
- Spouse: Barbara von Orelli (m. 1742)
- Parent(s): Hans Heinrich von Orelli; Anna Lavater
- Relatives: Daniel Orelli (uncle)
- Occupation: Merchant

Hans Heinrich von Orelli (10 November 1715 – 4 July 1785) was a Swiss merchant and politician who served as the first mayor of Zurich from an immigrant family (1778–1785). He was also a member of the Small Council and an economic expert.

== Early life and family ==
Orelli was born on 10 November 1715 in Zurich to Hans Heinrich von Orelli, a member of the Council, and Anna Lavater. He was the nephew of Daniel Orelli. In 1742, he married Barbara von Orelli, daughter of Leonhard, a merchant.

== Career ==
Orelli received his commercial training in Zurich, followed by study trips to Germany, the Netherlands, and France. He spent time at a branch of his father's raw silk factory in northern Italy.

He worked as a merchant and served as representative of the Konstaffel in the Small Council from 1757 to 1777. From 1760, he held the position of treasurer. In 1778, Orelli became the first mayor of Zurich from an immigrant family, serving in this capacity until his death in 1785. He also served as president of the Commercial Directorate and was recognized as a major expert in economics.

== Death ==
Orelli died on 4 July 1785 in Zurich.

== Bibliography ==
- Schulthess, H. Die von Orelli von Locarno und Zürich, 1941
