= Hans Conrad von Orelli (1714) =

Swiss publisher and politician

Personal details
- Born: 19 November 1714 Zurich, Old Swiss Confederacy
- Died: 10 March 1785 (aged 70) Zurich, Old Swiss Confederacy
- Spouse: Dorothea Wyss (m. 1738)
- Parent(s): Hans Caspar von Orelli; Susanna Escher vom Glas
- Occupation: Publisher, printer, politician

Hans Conrad von Orelli (19 November 1714 – 10 March 1785) was a Swiss publisher, printer, and politician from Zurich. He was a prominent member of Zurich's governing councils and directed the publishing house that would later become Orell Füssli.

== Early life and family ==
Hans Conrad von Orelli was born on 19 November 1714 in Zurich to Hans Caspar von Orelli, a representative of the Saffron guild to the Grand Council, and Susanna Escher vom Glas. He belonged to the Orelli family, a prominent Zurich family originally from Locarno. In 1738, he married Dorothea Wyss, daughter of David Wyss, a district captain.

== Publishing career ==
From 1735, Orelli directed a publishing house and printing press (which would later become known as Orell Füssli) together with his uncle Johann Jakob Bodmer. He published works by poets and produced the Zurich Bible.

== Political career ==
Orelli served as secretary of the chapter of the Grossmünster. He represented the Tanners' Guild to the Grand Council beginning in 1754 and to the Small Council from 1767 to 1784. He served as director of the convents from 1777. Orelli also held the position of bailiff of Wädenswil from 1760 to 1766 and of the Neuamt from 1775 to 1777.

== Bibliography ==
- Schulthess, H. (1941). Die von Orelli von Locarno und Zürich.
