= Orelli family =

Noble family from Locarno

Orelli Orell, de Orello
- Noble family
- Country: Switzerland
- Current region: Locarno, Zürich
- Origin: Locarno
- Founded: 12th century
- Cadet branches: Zürich branch

The Orelli (also Orell or de Orello) are a noble family attested in Locarno since the 12th century, probably descending from the Besozzo, Lombard nobles from the County of Seprio, who received the Locarno region as a fief around the year 1000. In the 16th century, several members adhered to the Reformation and were forced into exile (1555), giving rise to the Zürich branch.

== Ticino ==
The principal family of the Capitanei di Locarno, the Orelli played an important political role during the Middle Ages and the early modern period, especially north of Lake Maggiore and in the Ambrosian valleys. In the pieve of Locarno, they possessed several fortresses and castles, notably part of the castle of Saints-Abonde-et-Blaise, the castle of Gordola, and the small castle of Ascona, as well as lands in Val Onsernone, the Centovalli, Val Maggia and Gambarogno. The family acquired properties south of Monte Ceneri (for example in 1186 the fortress and toll of Taverne), probably with the aim of controlling the main communication routes. In the pieve of Locarno, the statutes of 1365 granted them the right to appoint fifteen (twelve from the mid-16th century) of the twenty-one members of the community Council. From 1342 to 1798, the Orelli of Locarno were podestàs of Brissago.

In Val Blenio and Biasca between the 12th and 15th centuries, two closely related branches received from the cathedral chapter of Milan the offices of podestà (rector) and advocatus (avogadro), which they transmitted hereditarily; in Val Blenio, the Orelli possessed several castles (Castro; Serravalle). They briefly extended their power to the Leventina at the end of the 13th century. Belonging to the Ghibelline party, the family participated in the principal conflicts of the era, as attested by Simone Orelli, who experienced various fortunes.

== Zürich branch ==
Aloisio is the ancestor of the Zürich branch, also called Orell. His sons Franz and Johann Melchior Aloys von Orelli exported spun yarn and woolen and cotton fabrics to northern Italy. Both were admitted to the citizenship of Zürich in 1592, but without the right of access to political offices. Johann Melchior Aloys and his descendants founded in the 17th century silk trading companies, named after their different family houses (zum Mohrenkopf, im Tiefenhof, zum Spiegel, zur Sonne, zur Stelze and zum Gemsberg). According to export statistics, they were at the head of Zürich commerce in 1700, in the mid-18th century they were still in third place, and in 1797 in ninth place.

As a consequence of the tendency to close access to citizenship in the early modern period, the Orelli were refused unreserved citizenship grants in 1606, 1639 and 1673. It was only in 1679 that the Grand Council granted all branches of the family full citizenship rights, after the Orelli had considered transferring their businesses to Bern; during the vote, 124 of the 212 members of the council had to withdraw due to family ties (sometimes up to the third degree), the Orelli having concluded marriages in the 17th century with several leading families.

Until 1798, six members sat on the Small Council, notably Felix Orelli and Hans Conrad von Orelli (1714), who also took over a printing house in 1735 (today Orell Füssli). Hans Heinrich von Orelli was mayor of Zürich (1778–1785). Six Orelli were pastors in the 18th century, three others became canons or professors. Some were officers in the service of France and Holland, including Felix Orelli. In the 19th century, many pursued academic careers (Aloys von Orelli; Hans Conrad von Orelli (1770); Johann Caspar von Orelli) or worked in banking (Paul Carl Eduard von Orelli) and in the civil service (Carl Anton Ludwig von Orelli; Hans Conrad von Orelli (1853); Heinrich von Orelli).

In 1681, the Orelli of Zürich were received into the Corporation of Nobles of Locarno, then regained citizenship of that city in 1936. From 1784, the family adopted the particle "von", referring to its noble origins.

== Bibliography ==
- Almanach généalogique suisse, 1, 362–367; 5, 477–481; 9, 163–306
- Meyer, Blenio
- H. Schulthess, Die von Orelli von Locarno und Zürich, 1941
- R. Huber, "Gli archivi dei Muralto, degli Orelli e della Corporazione dei Nobili di Locarno", in Bolletino della Società storica Locarnese, 2005, 49-58
