= Heinrich von Orelli =

Swiss judge and politician

Personal details
- Born: 10 May 1783 Zurich, Old Swiss Confederacy
- Died: 26 December 1860 (aged 77) Zurich, Switzerland
- Spouse: Anna Schulthess (m. 1808)
- Parent(s): Johann Heinrich von Orelli; Regula Lochmann
- Occupation: Judge, politician

Heinrich von Orelli (10 May 1783 – 26 December 1860) was a Swiss judge and politician from Zurich.

== Early life and education ==
Orelli was born on 10 May 1783 in Zurich, the son of Johann Heinrich von Orelli, secretary of the Physical Society of Zurich, and Regula Lochmann. He attended the Zurich School of Art and subsequently worked as a substitute at the registry office in Brugg from 1799 to 1802. He then pursued studies at the University of Göttingen and undertook educational travels.

== Personal life ==
In 1808, Orelli married Anna Schulthess, daughter of Hans Conrad Schulthess. He was a member of the noble society of the Schildner zum Schneggen from 1806.

== Political and judicial career ==
Orelli served as a judge on the Zurich district court from 1808 to 1816. He was subsequently appointed to the Zurich Supreme Court, serving two terms: from 1819 to 1829 and again from 1831 to 1843. He was elected as a member of the Grand Council of Zurich from 1815 to 1839. From 1829 to 1831, Orelli served on the cantonal government and was a delegate to the Federal Diet from 1829 to 1830.

== Freemasonry and philanthropy ==
Orelli served as Worshipful Master of the Masonic lodge Modestia cum Libertate from 1823 to 1830. In 1809, he co-founded the Zurich asylum for the blind and deaf-mute.

== Death ==
Orelli died in Zurich on 26 December 1860.

== See also ==
- Orelli family

== Bibliography ==
- Schulthess, H. Die von Orelli von Locarno und Zürich. 1941, pp. 301–306.
- Schmid, S.G. Die Zürcher Kantonsregierung seit 1803. 2003, p. 328.
