= Bank in Zürich =

Former Swiss bank

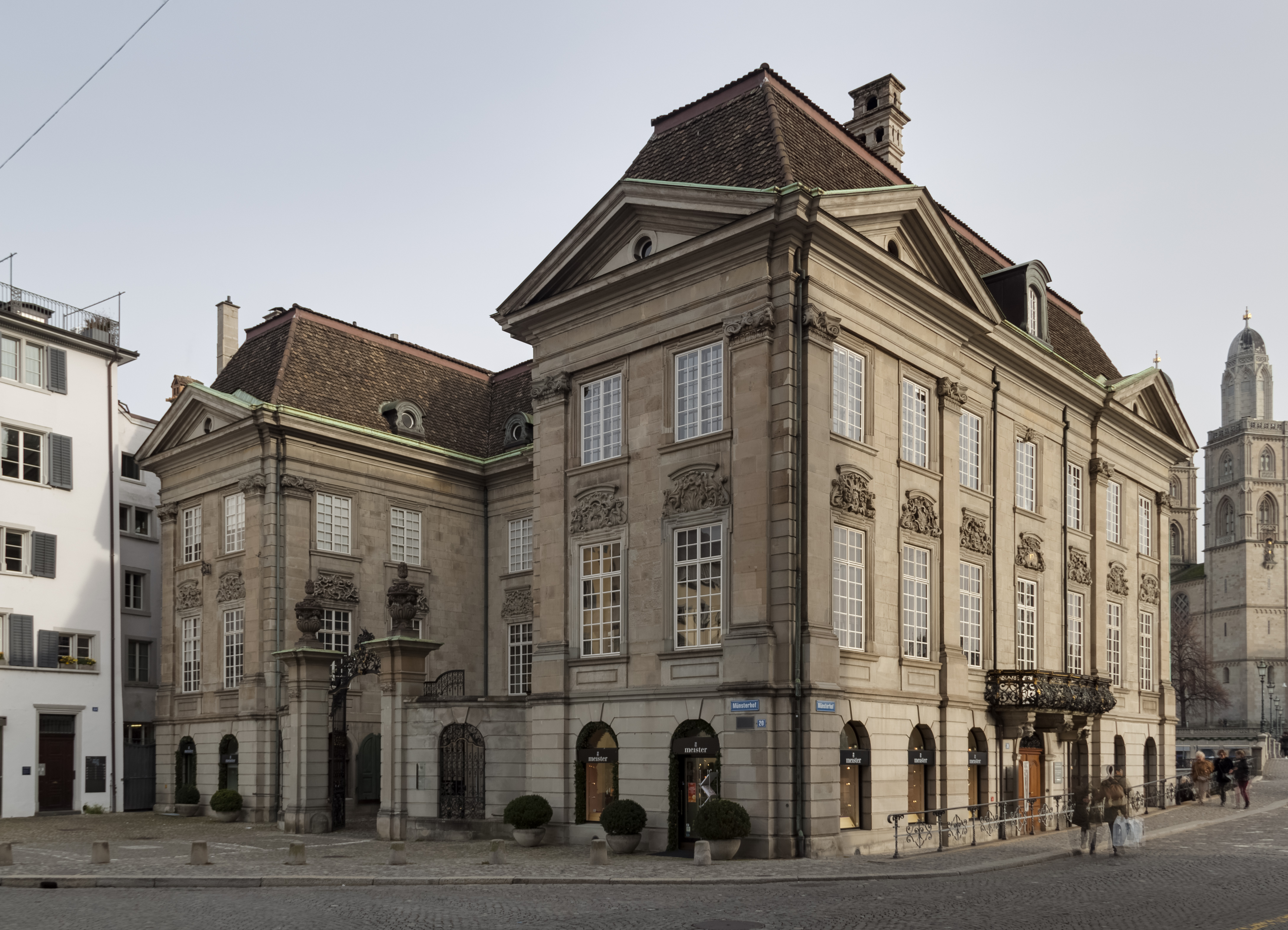
- Industry: Banking
- Founded: 1836
- Defunct: 1905
- Fate: Merged with Crédit Suisse
- Successor: Crédit Suisse
- Headquarters: Zunfthaus zur Meisen, Zurich, Switzerland

Bank in Zürich was a Swiss banking institution founded in 1836 in Zurich.

Paul Carl Eduard von Orelli served as director of the bank from 1892 and initiated its merger with the Schweizerische Kreditanstalt (later known as Credit Suisse) in 1904. On January 14, 1905, the bank concluded a joint venture agreement with Schweizerische Kreditanstalt, which allowed the bank in Zurich to continue as an independent stock corporation, but in effect was almost equivalent to a merger. In a new agreement with Schweizerische Kreditanstalt dated December 20, 1982, the merger of the bank was decided.

== Bibliography ==
- Bleuler, Werner (1906). Die Bank in Zürich, 1836–1906.
