= Felix Orelli =

18th-century Swiss politician

Personal details
- Born: Hans Felix Orelli; 3 September 1754 Zurich, Old Swiss Confederacy
- Died: 8 April 1798 (aged 43) Zurich, Old Swiss Confederacy
- Spouse: Regula Landolt (m. 1780)
- Relations: Orelli family
- Parent(s): Hans Ulrich Orelli; Regula von Muralt
- Occupation: Politician, military officer, bailiff

Felix Orelli (3 September 1754 – 8 April 1798) was a Swiss politician and military officer from Zurich. He served in various governmental positions in the Old Swiss Confederacy, including as bailiff of Thurgau and colonel of Zurich troops.

== Early life and family ==
Felix Orelli was born Hans Felix Orelli on 3 September 1754 in Zurich to a prominent patrician family. His father, Hans Ulrich Orelli, was a member of the Konstaffel, one of Zurich's guilds, and his mother was Regula von Muralt. In 1780, he married Regula Landolt, daughter of Hans Heinrich Landolt.

Orelli represented the branch of the Orelli family that abandoned industrial activities in favor of public service.

== Career ==
=== Military service ===
From 1770 to 1779, Orelli served in the French foreign service with the Lochmann regiment. In 1792, he served as colonel of Zurich troops during the occupation of the border at Basel.

=== Civil positions ===
Upon returning from French service in 1779, Orelli became secretary of the Chamber of the Reformation in Zurich. He was appointed judge in 1785, a position he held until 1790, and subsequently served as avoyer (president) of the city tribunal from 1791.

In 1788, Orelli became a member of the noble society of Schildner zum Schneggen. From 1791 to 1798, he represented the Konstaffel in the Small Council.

From 1795 to 1796, Orelli served as bailiff of Thurgau, an important administrative position in the Old Swiss Confederacy.

== Bibliography ==
- Schulthess, H. Die von Orelli von Locarno und Zürich. 1941, pp. 194–195.
- Almanach généalogique suisse, vol. 9, p. 247.
