= Daniel Orelli =

Swiss merchant and financier

- Born: 6 November 1653; Zurich, Old Swiss Confederacy
- Died: 17 December 1726 (aged 73); Zurich, Old Swiss Confederacy
- Occupations: Merchant, financier
- Known for: First member of his family to hold political office in Zurich
- Spouse(s): Elisabeth Werdmüller; Catharina Ulrich
- Parent(s): Hans Georg Orelli; Anna Magdalena Pestalozzi

Daniel Orelli (6 November 1653 – 17 December 1726) was a Swiss merchant and financier from Zurich. He was the first member of his family to hold political office in the city.

== Biography ==
Daniel Orelli was born on 6 November 1653 in Zurich, the son of Hans Georg Orelli, a merchant, and Anna Magdalena Pestalozzi. He married twice: first to Elisabeth Werdmüller, daughter of Jakob Werdmüller, a cavalry captain, and later to Catharina Ulrich, daughter of Caspar Ulrich. The family was Protestant.

Orelli worked as a merchant and financier. In 1679, he was appointed judge of the city, becoming the first member of the Orelli family to hold a political position in Zurich. He served as representative of the Safran guild in the Grand Council from 1709 and held the position of director of posts from 1687 to 1714.

In 1683, Orelli published his work Locarnesische Verfolgung 1555, which reinforced the erroneous idea that Protestant refugees had introduced the silk industry to Zurich.

== See also ==
- Orelli family

== Bibliography ==
- Schulthess, H. Die von Orelli von Locarno und Zürich, 1941
