= Paul Carl Eduard von Orelli =

Swiss banker and philanthropist

- Born: 17 August 1849; Zurich, Switzerland
- Died: 18 January 1927 (aged 77); Zurich, Switzerland
- Occupation: Banker
- Known for: Director of Bank in Zürich, merger with Crédit Suisse
- Spouse: Beatrice von Reding (m. 1883)
- Parent(s): Hans Conrad Orelli; Bertha Ziegler
- Awards: Knight of the Order of St. Gregory the Great (1904)

Paul Carl Eduard von Orelli (17 August 1849 – 18 January 1927) was a Swiss banker and philanthropist from Zurich. He served as director of the Bank in Zürich and initiated its merger with Crédit Suisse in 1904.

== Early life and education ==
Paul Carl Eduard von Orelli was born on 17 August 1849 in Zurich to Hans Conrad Orelli, a banker, and Bertha Ziegler. He was initially Protestant but converted to Catholicism in 1882. He received his education in Paris and London between 1870 and 1873.

== Banking career ==
Orelli entered the family banking business, Bank in Zürich, in 1873. He rose to become director of the bank in 1892. In 1904, he initiated the merger of Bank in Zürich with Crédit Suisse. He also served as vice-consul of the United States from 1884.

== Philanthropy and social work ==
Orelli supported numerous social and charitable works. He devoted particular attention to the spiritual needs of Italian workers in Zurich. In recognition of his charitable activities, he was made a Knight of the Order of St. Gregory the Great by the Holy See in 1904.

== Personal life ==
In 1883, Orelli married Beatrice von Reding, daughter of Josef Franz Xaver von Reding. He died on 18 January 1927 in Zurich.

== Bibliography ==
- Teobaldi, A. (1978). Katholiken im Kanton Zürich, pp. 101–105.
