= Hans Conrad von Orelli (1770) =

Swiss Protestant theologian

- Born: 22 August 1770; Zurich, Old Swiss Confederacy
- Died: 25 October 1826 (aged 56); Zurich, Switzerland
- Occupations: Theologian, professor, pastor
- Known for: Liberal theology, classical scholarship
- Spouse: Dorothea Cramer (m. 1797)
- Parent(s): Hans Caspar von Orelli; Dorothea Usteri

Hans Conrad von Orelli (22 August 1770 – 25 October 1826) was a Swiss Protestant theologian, professor, and pastor in Zurich. He was known for his liberal theological views and his scholarly editions of classical Greek and Latin texts.

== Early life and education ==
Orelli was born on 22 August 1770 in Zurich, the son of Hans Caspar von Orelli, bailiff of Wädenswil, and Dorothea Usteri. He studied theology in Zurich and was ordained in 1792. In 1797, he married Dorothea Cramer, daughter of Rudolf Cramer, archdeacon of the Grossmünster.

== Career ==
=== Academic positions ===
Orelli began his academic career at the Carolinum in Zurich, where he was appointed professor of church history in 1794 and professor of ethics in 1796. He served as rector of the Carolinum from 1815 to 1816.

=== Ecclesiastical positions ===
In 1796, Orelli was appointed deacon of the Fraumünster. In 1810, he became pastor of the church of the Dominicans and canon of the chapter of the Grossmünster.

== Theological views and controversies ==
As a theologian of liberal tendency, Orelli opposed Johann Kaspar Lavater. His theological positions reflected the liberal currents of early 19th-century Swiss Protestantism.

== Scholarly work ==
Orelli edited classical Greek and Latin texts, including the Disputationum adversus gentes libri septem by Arnobius the Elder (1816–1817). He also published his own sermons and studies on the recent history of schools and the Church in Zurich.

== See also ==
- Orelli family
