= Hans Conrad von Orelli (officer) =

Swiss artillery officer

- Born: 2 March 1853; Zurich, Switzerland
- Died: 19 March 1904 (aged 51); Naples, Italy
- Military career
- Allegiance: Switzerland
- Branch: Swiss Army
- Service years: 1877–1904
- Rank: Colonel
- Unit: Artillery
- Commands: Technical Section, Federal War Material Administration (1893–1903)

Hans Conrad von Orelli (2 March 1853 – 19 March 1904) was a Swiss military officer who played a key role in the modernization of Swiss artillery. He served as colonel and head of the Technical Section of the Federal War Material Administration from 1893 to 1903.

== Early life and education ==
Orelli was born on 2 March 1853 in Zurich. He was the son of Johann Conrad von Orelli, an officer in French service who became a colonel and inspector of the federal artillery, and Anna Bosshard. He studied forestry engineering at the Swiss Federal Institute of Technology in Zurich.

== Military career ==
Orelli served as an artillery instructor officer from 1877 to 1893 and as a general staff officer from 1880 to 1884. He was promoted to colonel in 1894. From 1893 to 1903, he headed the Technical Section of the Federal War Material Administration. During this period, Orelli played a decisive role in modernizing the Swiss artillery.

== Personal life ==
In 1887, Orelli married Amalie Hauser, daughter of Johann Jakob Hauser. He died on 19 March 1904 in Naples, Italy.

== See also ==
- Orelli family

== Bibliography ==
- ASMZ, 1904, no 13, pp. 101–102
- Wetter, E., E. von Orelli, Wer ist wer im Militär?, 1986, p. 126
- L'Etat-major, 8, p. 266
