= Neuamt =

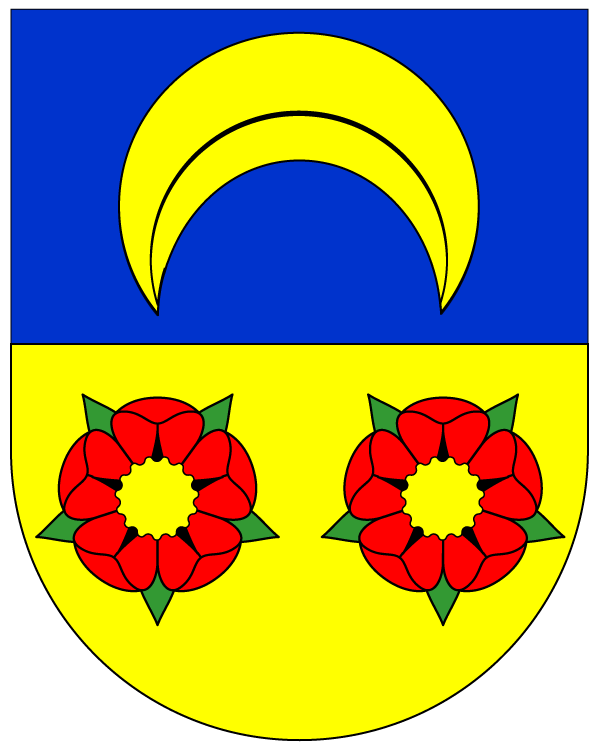
Coat of arms (16th century); its crescent was taken up in the modern municipal coats of arms of Niederglatt, Neerach and Stadel.

Neuamt was a bailiwick (Obervogtei) of the city-state of Zurich within the Old Swiss Confederacy, from 1442 to 1798. It comprised a strip of land west of the Glatt River, stretching from Oberglatt to the river’s confluence with the Rhine, with a width of around five kilometers.

== History ==
The Neuamt was established in 1442 after its separation from the County of Kyburg and became an administrative district of Zürich. The local legal code was based on the "Offnung" (charter) of the Neerach manor. It was later used as the law of the bailiwick. From the mid-16th century, the bailiwick court met regularly in Niederglatt, where homage was also received. It consisted of a deputy bailiff, two court officers, and twelve judges. After 1600, most disputes were initially decided by the two senior bailiffs (Obervögte) living in Zurich, where the bailiwick’s chancery was also based from the early 17th century.

By the late 15th century, Neuamt had a population of roughly 950 inhabitants. It grew to around 5,500 by 1689, then fell slightly to 4,300 by 1790. The bailiwick had its own treasury (Amtsbüchse), which contained over 33,000 gulden by 1798. After the bailiwick was dissolved that year, the funds were divided among the municipalities. Local jurisdictions existed across the region in the 15th century, but by the 17th century only the village of Weiach retained a separate episcopal jurisdiction under the Diocese of Constance.

Neerach, one of the villages within the Neuamt, came under Zürich’s rule in 1442 and remained part of the bailiwick until its dissolution in 1798. The crescent of the Neuamt’s coat of arms appears in the arms of Neerach and other villages.

== See also ==
- History of the canton of Zürich
- Zürcher Unterland
