= Buyruldu =

Decree issued by high-rank officials in the Ottoman Empire

A buyruldu was a decree issued by a high-ranking official and passed to lower-ranking ones in the Ottoman Empire. It literally means "it was decreed" in Turkish, derived from the verb buyur- (to decree).

A buyruldu could be issued by the grand vizier or other ministers such as defterdar (finance minister) in the capital; or by the beylerbey (provincial governors) in the country. The decrees issued by the sultan were called ferman.
