= Aloisio Orelli =

16th-century merchant from Locarno

- Born: 1486; Locarno, Old Swiss Confederacy
- Died: 13 July 1572 (aged 85–86); Zürich, Old Swiss Confederacy
- Occupations: Pharmacist, merchant
- Spouse: Apollonia Toma
- Parent: Johannetus Orello

Aloisio Orelli (after 1486 – 13 July 1572) was a merchant and pharmacist from Locarno who became a founding member of the Protestant community there before fleeing to Zürich as a religious refugee. He is the ancestor of the Orelli family of Zürich.

== Life ==
Aloisio Orelli was born after 1486 in Locarno, the son of Johannetus Orello. He married Apollonia Toma, also from Locarno.

In 1541, Orelli purchased a pharmacy in Locarno and engaged in trade. He was among the leaders of the Protestant community in Locarno. In 1555, religious persecution forced him to take refuge in Zürich.

By 1557, Orelli owned a shop in Zürich where he traded in leather goods, hats, soaps, tallow, and candles. From 1558 onward, he expanded his commerce to include silk fabrics, velvet, and ticking. He died in Zürich on 13 July 1572.

== Legacy ==
Orelli is recognized as the progenitor of the Orelli family of Zürich. In 1797, Salomon von Orelli dedicated to him an idealized biography of over 500 pages.

== Bibliography ==
- Schulthess, H. Die von Orelli von Locarno und Zürich, 1941
