= Hans Konrad von Orelli (1846) =

Swiss theologian (1846–1912)

Hans Konrad von Orelli (25 January 1846 – November 7, 1912) was a Swiss theologian.

== Biography ==
He was born in Zürich and educated at Lausanne, Zürich and Erlangen. He also visited Tübingen for theology and Leipzig for oriental languages. In 1869 he was appointed preacher at the orphan house, Zürich, and in 1871 Privatdozent at the university. In 1873 he went to Basel as professor extraordinarius of theology, becoming ordinary professor in 1881. His chief work is on the Old Testament. He wrote a journal of Palestinian travel, Durchs Heilige Land (Basel, 1878); Die alttestamentliche Weissagung wn der Vollendung des Goltesreiches (Vienna, 1882; Eng. trans. Edinburgh, 1885), commentaries on Isaiah, Jeremiah (1886); Ezekiel and the Twelve Prophets (1888); and Die himmlischen Heerschaaren (Basel, 1889).

Under the anglicised name Conrad von Orelli, he presented a lecture on The General Belief in the Need of Vicarious Sacrifices at the World Parliament of Religions in Chicago in 1894.

He died in Basel on 7 November 1912.
