= Brig–Zermatt railway line =

Railway in Switzerland

Brig–Zermatt
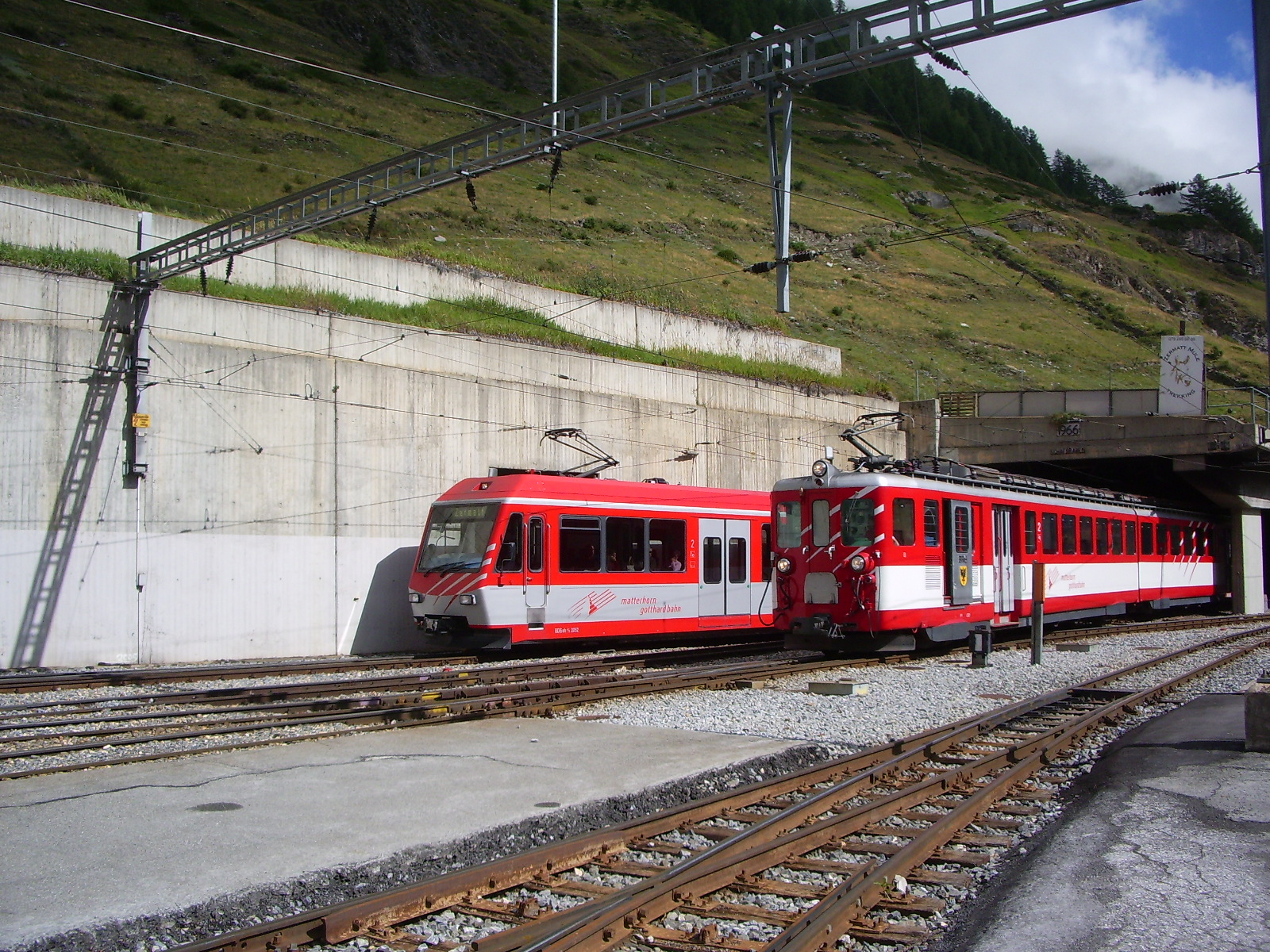
- Contrasting railcars at Zermatt station.

Overview
- Status: Open
- Owner: BVZ Holding
- Locale: Mattertal, Valais, Switzerland
- Termini: Brig; Zermatt
- Stations: 9
- Website: Matterhorn Gotthard Bahn; BVZ Holding AG

Service
- Type: Heavy rail
- System: Matterhorn Gotthard Bahn
- Services: Rhone Valley and Mattertal
- Operator: Matterhorn Gotthard Bahn
- Depot: Glisergrund

History
- Opened: 3 July 1890 / 18 July 1891

Technical
- Line length: 43.985 km (27.331 mi)
- Number of tracks: Single track
- Rack system: Abt
- Track gauge: 1,000 mm (3 ft 3 3/8 in) metre gauge
- Minimum radius: 80 m (260 ft)
- Electrification: 11 kV 16.7 Hz AC
- Highest elevation: 1,605.2 m (5,266 ft) above sea level
- Maximum incline: Adhesion 2.5% Rack rail 12.5%
Route map
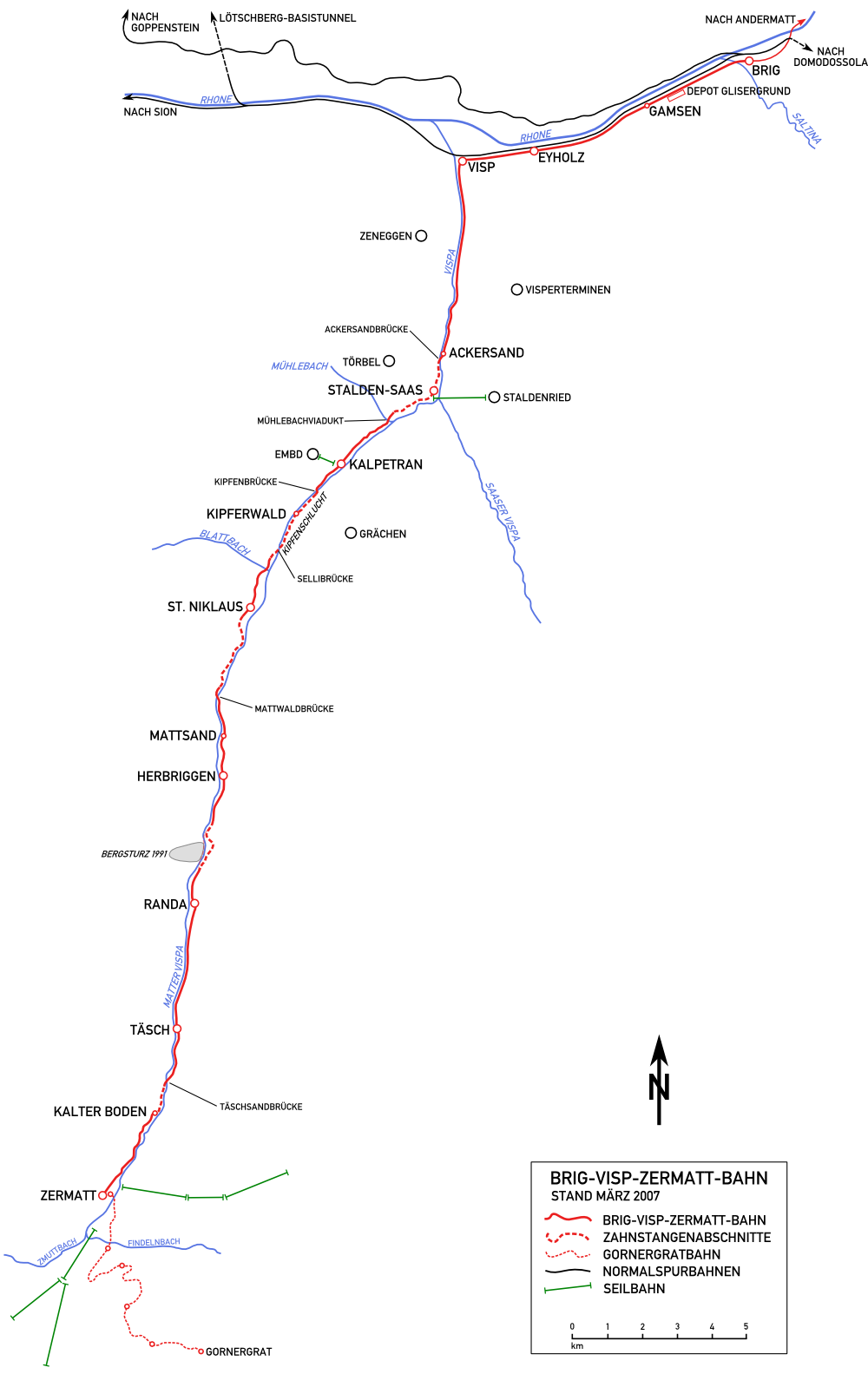
- Source: Swiss railway atlas

The Brig–Zermatt railway line is a metre gauge railway line in the canton of Valais in Switzerland. Its 44-kilometre-long (27 mi) line links the communities of Brig and Visp in the Rhone Valley with Täsch and the car free holiday resort of Zermatt in the Mattertal. The line also forms part of the much travelled and admired route of the Glacier Express between St. Moritz and Zermatt. The Gornergratbahn (which was opened in 1898) is connected with the line at Zermatt.

The line was originally built by the Visp-Zermatt-Bahn (VZ), and opened between Visp and Zermatt in 1890–1891. The extension to Brig opened in 1930. The company was renamed the Brig-Visp-Zermatt-Bahn (BVZ) in 1961, and was later branded as BVZ Zermatt-Bahn. It merged with the Furka Oberalp Bahn (FO) in 2003 to form the Matterhorn Gotthard Bahn (MGB).

== History ==
=== Planning, construction and commencement of traffic ===
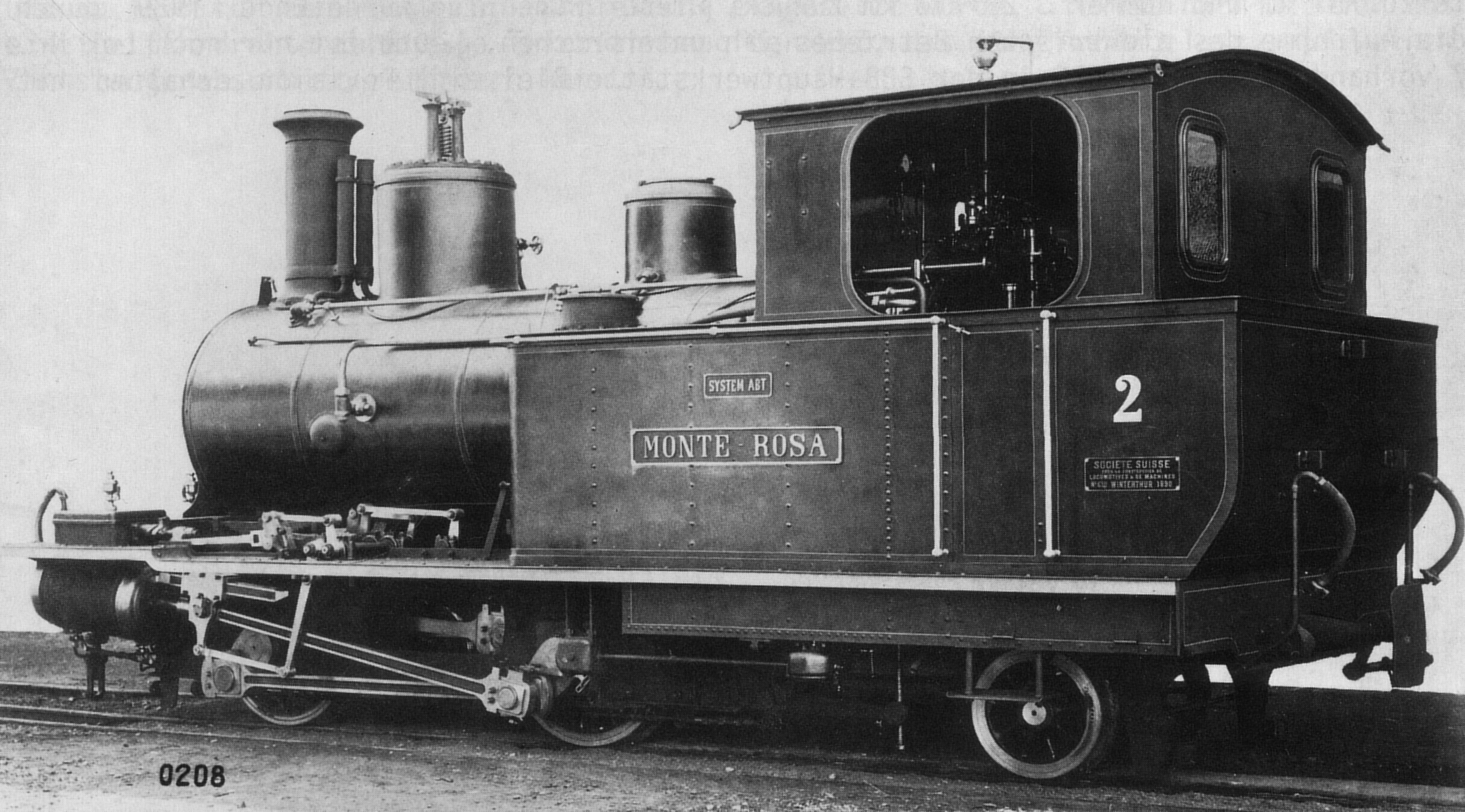
Steam loco No. 2

The mountain village of Zermatt first gained major recognition in Europe in light of the inaugural ascent of the Matterhorn by Edward Whymper in 1865. From then onwards, the number of overnight visitors rose steadily, even though the village itself was only reachable by a lengthy march on foot through the barren valley of Zermatt. Even the simple mule ride as far as St. Niklaus took a long time. Nevertheless, by the 1880s there were already as many as 12,000 tourist visits to Zermatt each year. To promote tourism in the valley, and especially in Zermatt itself, plans soon emerged to build a railway line intended to connect the emerging spa with the Rhone Valley.

On 21 September 1886, the Swiss Federal Council granted the banking house Masson, Chavannes & Co. in Lausanne and the Basler Handelsbank an initial concession. The original request was for a 750 mm (2 ft 5 1/2 in) narrow gauge railway from Visp to Zermatt, using a mixture of adhesion and rack railway line. At the insistence of the Bundesrat, the gauge was finally altered to metre gauge. The railway was at the outset to be operated from the start of June to the end of September, as the promoters did not wish to take on the risks of operating the line in an alpine winter. Additionally, it was only in summer that there were prospects of significant numbers of passengers, as in those days winter tourism was still of no great importance. Nevertheless, the Bundesrat reserved the right to extend the operating season, and similarly stipulated that concessionary fares be offered to locals.

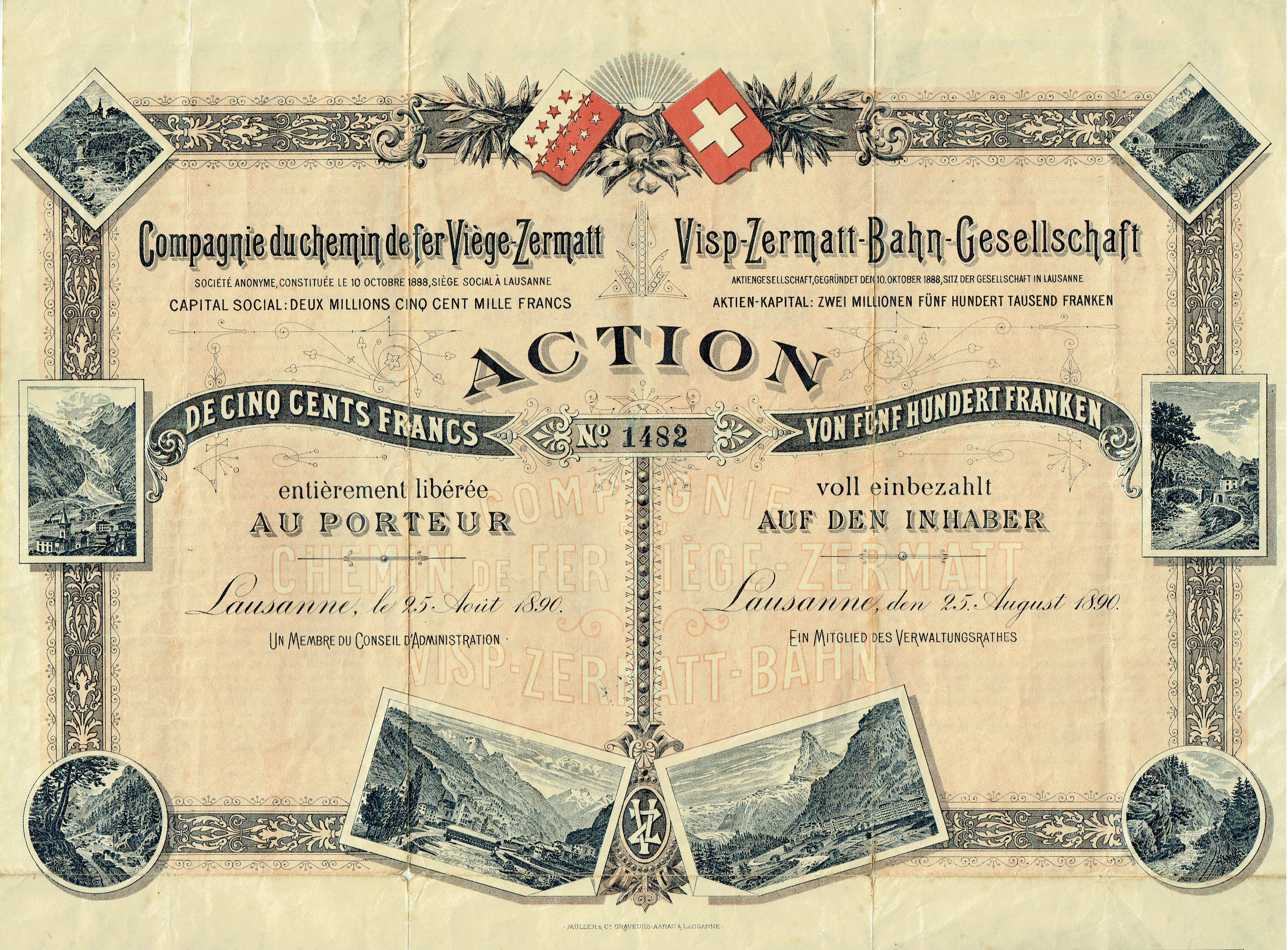
Share of the Compagnie du Chemin de Fer de Viège à Zermatt SA, issued 25 August 1890

Planning and construction of the line was entrusted by the participating banks to the railway company Suisse Occidentale-Simplon (SOS), which, in the summer of 1887, conducted extensive survey work in the Mattertal. On 10 October 1888, the Compagnie du Chemin de Fer de Viège à Zermatt SA emerged as the operating company.

The exact route and mode of operation was initially the subject of intense debate. The Suisse Occidentale-Simplon proposed a pure adhesion line, with a maximum gradient of 4.5%, while the engineer Ernest von Stockalper, who was working on the construction of the Gotthardbahn, proposed a combined adhesion and rack railway, as originally planned. A Special Commission established to investigate the ideal mode of operation visited, for the purpose of its investigations, numerous rack railways in Switzerland and Germany, including the Brünigbahn and the Rübelandbahn in the Harz, which was equipped with the Abt rack rail system. These visits led to a decision to equip the line with the system used on the Rübelandbahn, and using a maximum gradient of 12.5%. A total of six sections of track were to be laid out with a total of 7450 m of rack railway.

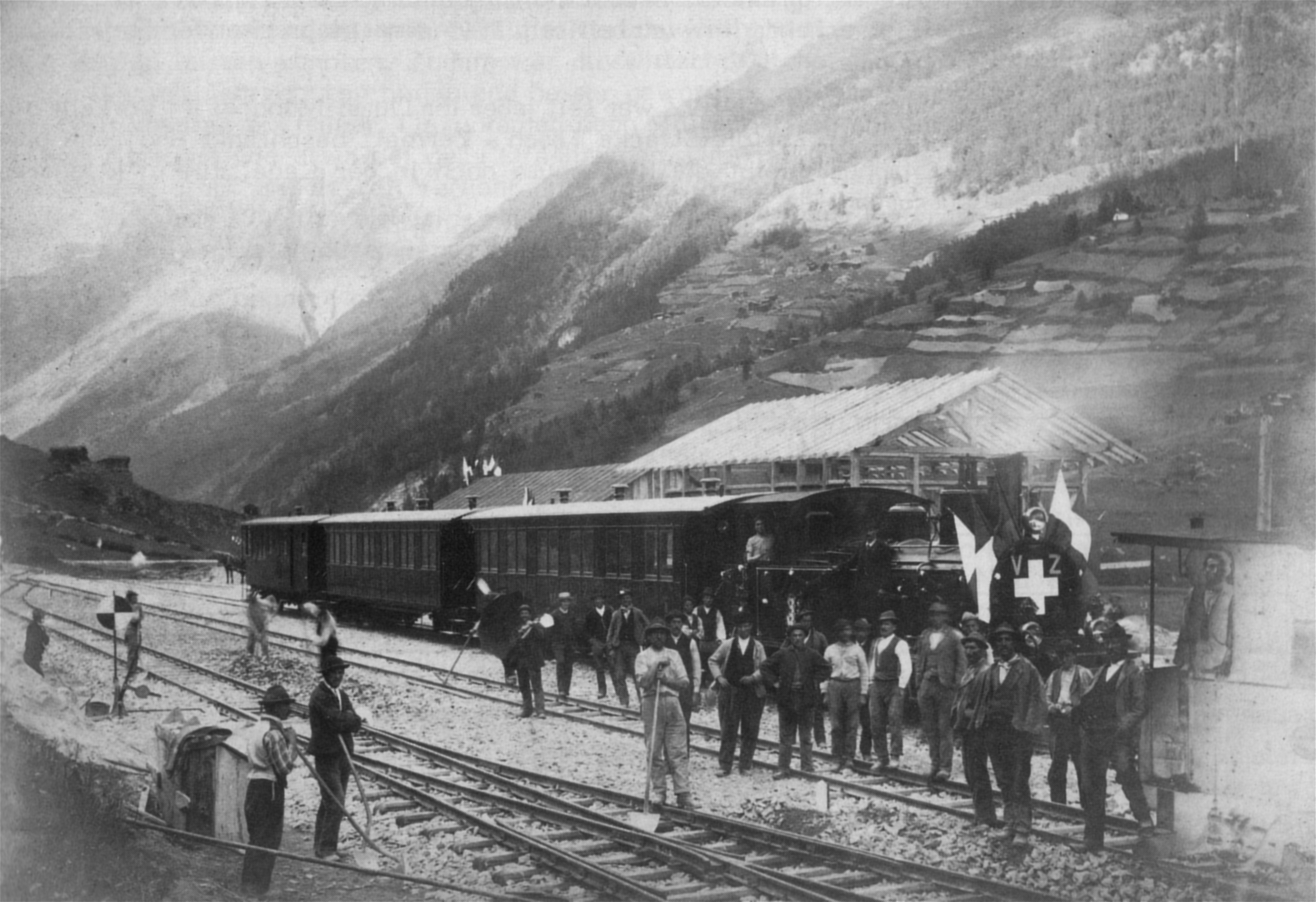
The arrival of the first train in Zermatt.

Construction began on 27 November 1888 in Visp. The work was entrusted to the western Swiss contractors Julius Chappuis, while the SOS undertook the purchase of land and the procurement of rolling stock. Acquisition of the necessary land turned out to be difficult, particularly in the municipalities of Stalden and St. Niklaus, as the local population was not interested in selling. Tedious expropriation procedures therefore became necessary. Also, land in the entire valley was divided into a myriad of tiny plots, and usually the actual owners of the plots were not recorded in official documents. The absence of a road made it necessary to transport the building materials almost exclusively over the already completed parts of the railway tracks to the construction sites.

On 3 July 1890, rail traffic on the first part of the line, between Visp and Stalden, could finally be introduced. By 26 August of the same year, the first trains reached St. Niklaus. In the following months, however, an unusually severe winter delayed the completion of the remaining sections. Only on 18 July 1891 could the entire line as far as Zermatt be handed over to traffic.

=== The first years of operations ===
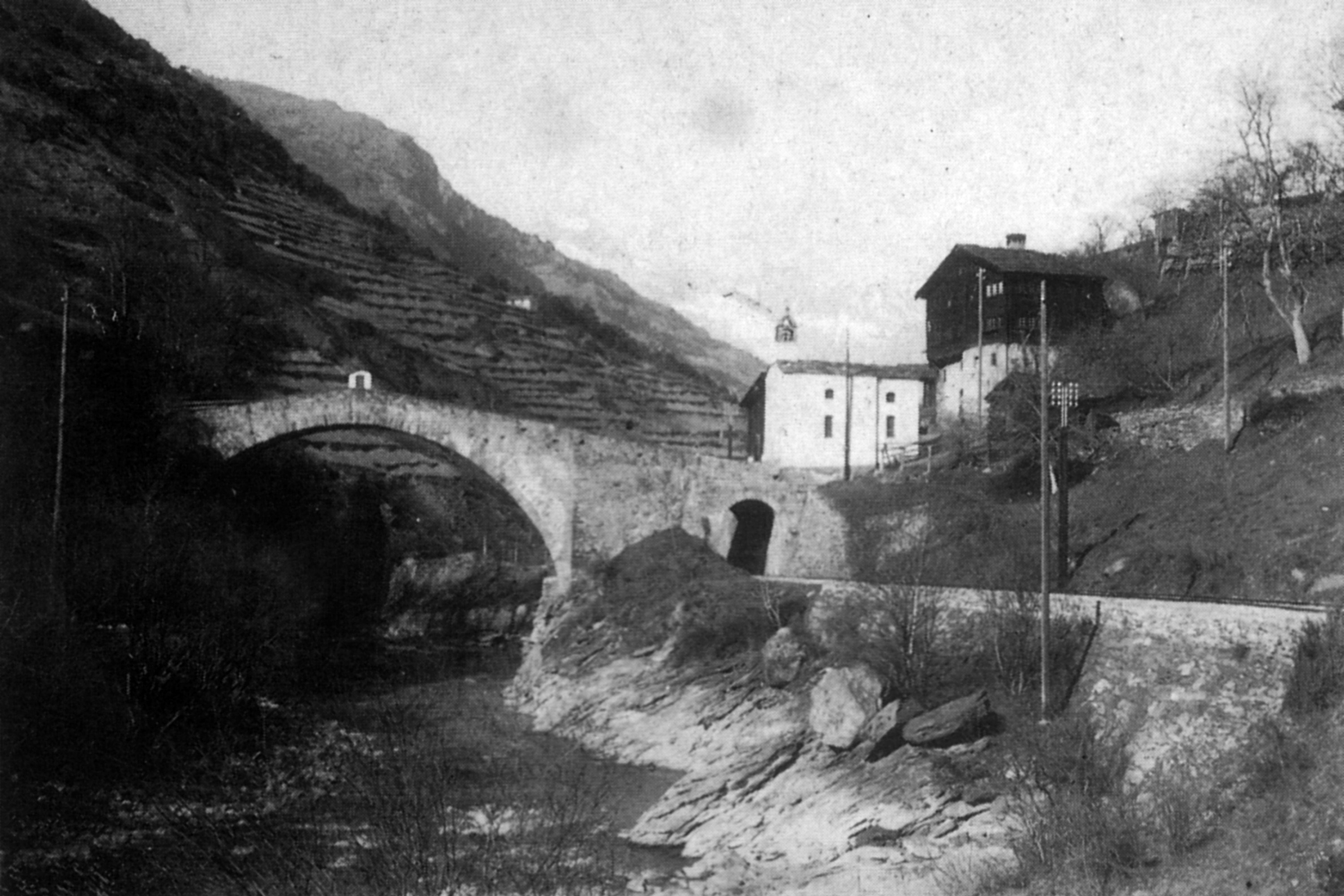
The Ritibrücke at Ackersand was given a second span for the VZ.

The Visp-Zermatt-Bahn (VZ) transferred the management of the line to the Suisse Occidentale-Simplon, as under that arrangement there was the possibility of using its staff elsewhere during the annual winter service interruption. This management agreement was approved by the SOS's successor company, the Jura-Simplon-Bahn (JS) and retained finally also by the Swiss Federal Railways (SBB) until 1920.

From the opening of the line onwards, passenger numbers continually increased, and after a short while were already significantly exceeding the predictions established at the time of the line's construction. Yet at the same time, the railway had to fight countless storms that again and again paralysed operations for days. The opening of the Gornergratbahn in 1898, the Simplon Tunnel in 1906 and the Lötschbergbahn in 1913 brought the Visp-Zermatt-Bahn further passengers. However, the upward trend met with an abrupt end at the outbreak of World War I. Foreign tourists stayed away from Switzerland, while coal prices massively increased. Passenger numbers fell back to the level of 1891. The timetable had to be substantially reduced, and fares strongly increased, but a cost covering operation was no longer possible. In the summer timetable for 1914, there were still six train pairs per day between Visp and Zermatt. After the outbreak of war there were only three, and from 1918 just two train pairs. In 1918, the total loss amounted to around 971,000 francs.

After the war, passenger numbers initially increased again only slowly. In the midst of the emerging boom, a flood on 24 September 1920 destroyed about 300 metres of the formation between Visp and Ackersand. Even this event came after the Vispa had already been diverted during the winter of 1919/20 by avalanches and landslides onto the formation at Kin, causing serious damage. The resulting deficit, which to this day is the most recent in the history of the railway, gave the SBB a reason not to renew the expiring management contracts, and to return the management of the railway to the VZ from 1 January 1921. The railway's management was then allocated to a collective directorate also responsible for managing the Gornergratbahn. At the same time, in collaboration with Zermatt hoteliers, an office was set up to run the first international promotions for the Zermatt tourist resort. In 1927, passenger numbers once again reached pre war levels. In 1931, with 227,845 passengers, the line set a new record that was not surpassed until after World War II.

=== Closing the gap, electrification and year-round operations ===
==== The rescue of the Furka Oberalp Bahn ====
The Visp-Zermatt-Bahn survived World War 1 unscathed. Totally different was the situation of the Brig-Furka-Disentis-Bahn (BFD), which was not yet completed as at the outbreak of the war. The BFD was able, by 1915, only to complete the section between Brig and Gletsch, and in 1923 had to file for bankruptcy. VZ Director Auguste Marguerat then took the initiative to preserve the line as a whole, including the section not yet built. A syndicate was formed, with the support of the Swiss Federation and the Cantons of Valais, Uri, Grisons and Vaud. On 4 April 1925, the railway facilities and rolling stock of the bankrupt line were purchased for 1.75 million francs. On 17 April 1925 came the founding of the Furka Oberalp Bahn AG (FO), with share capital of 3.3 million francs. As early as 4 July 1926, operations could commence on the whole FO line as far as Disentis. The FO was initially operated by the VZ, and only on 1 January 1961 spun off as a separate operation.

==== Closing the gap Brig–Visp ====
The entry into operation of the Furka Oberalp Bahn revealed a disadvantage, namely the gap between the end point of the VZ in Visp, and that of the FO in Brig. Additionally, since the opening of the Lötschbergbahn in 1913 passengers arriving from the direction of Bern had had to change trains in Brig as well as in Visp; a circumstance that was perceived as cumbersome.

Even as at the start of the 20th century, numerous projects for a metre gauge railway line from Visp to Brig had already been proposed. Most of them also envisaged a continuation in the direction of Furka or Grimsel, but in the end the only continuation to be realised was the later Furka Oberalp Bahn, with its starting point in Brig.

In 1919, the hotelier Alexander Seiler applied for a concession for a metre gauge tramway from Visp to Brig, which, if built, would serve to open up the small settlements between the two towns. That project was terminated after the SBB stated that it would insert two halting points into its standard gauge line. As the SBB did not follow up this announcement, the concession application was resubmitted in 1925. Shortly afterwards, a committee comprising the VZ, the FO and the Lonza Group works at Visp took over the project. Under the leadership of the VZ, it was transformed into a connecting narrow gauge railway running parallel to the SBB line, was no longer equipped with any halting points, and was to serve only to link the VZ and the FO. In 1928, the committee presented a correspondingly modified concession application, which was approved on 28 September 1928, subject to a condition that one intermediate halting point be included. Following the completion of that project as approved, continuous operations from Brig to Zermatt were finally able to begin on 5 June 1930. Curiously, the opening of the new link did not lead directly to a name change for the Visp-Zermatt-Bahn. Only on 1 June 1962 was the name changed to Compagnie du Chemin de Fer de Brigue-Viège-Zermatt (Brig-Visp-Zermatt-Bahn).

The three narrow gauge lines now bound by rail - the Visp-Zermatt-Bahn, the Furka Oberalp Bahn and the Rhätische Bahn - took advantage of the opening of the new connection to introduce a through express train from St. Moritz to Zermatt. On 25 June 1930, the now world-famous Glacier Express departed from Zermatt station for the first time.

==== Electrification ====
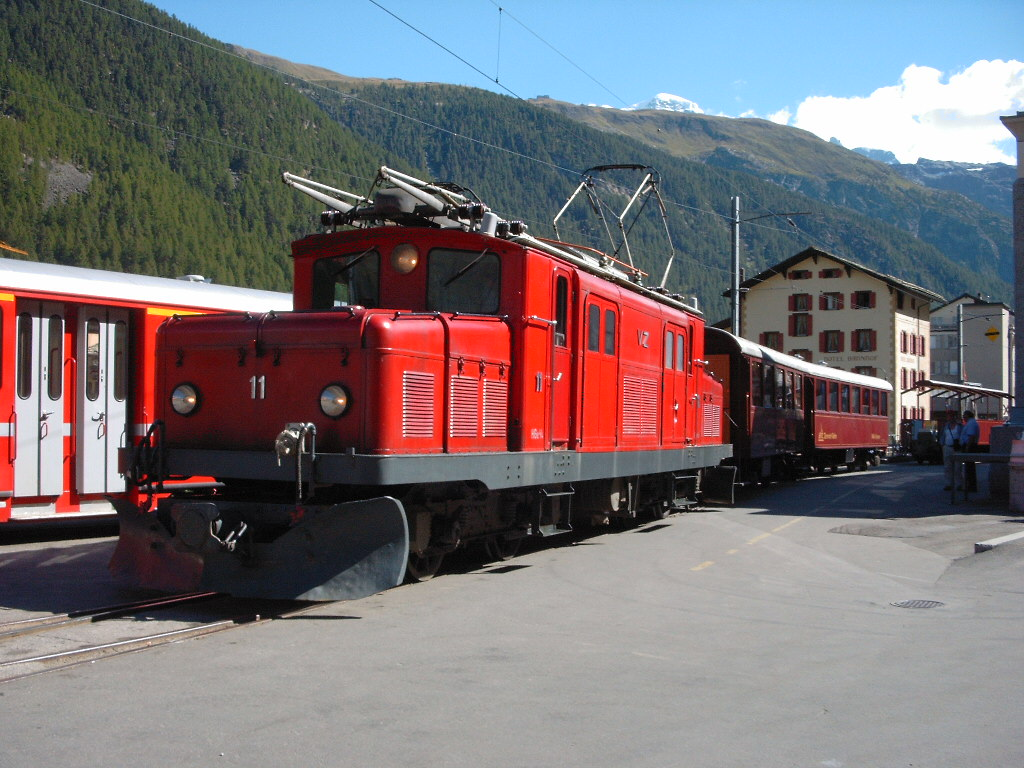
In 1929, the electric locomotive HGe 4/4 11–15 formed the basis of electric operations.

Under pressure from the enormous increase in coal prices during World War I, there were discussions soon after the end of the war about electrification of the railway, to make it independent of expensive imported coal. A study commissioned in 1919 recommended the use of direct current, with a voltage of between 1500 and 3000 volts. To save costs, parts from steam locomotives would be used for the construction of electric locos, and at times consideration was given to purchasing railcars. As prices of copper and the necessary electrical systems were still extremely high in the immediate aftermath of the war, the electrification plan had to be abandoned in view of the still ailing financial resources of the VZ.

Not until 1927 were there once again plans for conversion to electric operations. Now, however, high tension alternating current, at a frequency of 16 2/3 Hz, was to be used. This offered, amongst other things, the advantage of requiring only one electrical insertion point, near Visp, which would drastically reduce the costs of electrical systems in comparison with the original plans. Consideration was also given to adopting completely the SBB system of 15 kV AC railway electrification without alteration, but that idea quickly had to be abandoned. In particular, the Rhätische Bahn, which since 1913 had been operating electric traffic at 11,000 volts AC on the Engadine Line, stressed the benefits of using lower voltage than the SBB voltage. Whereas light weight air cooled transformers could be used on the Engadine Line, a heavy oil cooling system would be necessary for 15,000 volt operations, and that would greatly have increased the weight of the VZ locomotives. Additionally, the use of a single phase current system would make problem free through traffic possible in the event of electrification of the Furka Oberalp Bahn. These advantages led to the decision to use a voltage of 11,000 volts also on the Visp-Zermatt-Bahn.

For the electrification of the railway facilities and the procurement of electric locomotives, a budget of 1.7 million francs was established. Responsibility for the supply of energy was transferred to the SBB, which was contractually obliged to make alternating current available in Visp, at a voltage of 15,000 volts. This energy supply was then transformed down to the required voltage. For the haulage of trains, five electric locomotives of Type HGe 4/4 were procured from SLM, SIG and MFO. As from 1 October 1929, all scheduled VZ trains could finally be operated by electricity. Of the total of eight existing steam locos of Type HG 2/3, the five oldest examples could be withdrawn. The rest remained further in service as reserves, and for snow removal.

==== Introduction of winter operations ====
As early as 1907, there were calls from the valley population and Zermatt hoteliers for the Visp-Zermatt-Bahn to operate also in winter. The SBB and the VZ refused to conduct such operations, however, due to the high costs that would result, and the consequent lack of profitability. Also, the danger of accidents due to avalanches and flooding was regarded as an incalculable risk. In addition, for a long time there was, on the part of the VZ, a stance that in any event Zermatt was not suited to being a winter resort. The Valais Council of State, which viewed the prospect of winter traffic positively, therefore considered the possibility of extending the obligation to operate the VZ to the winter months, at least for the section from Visp to St. Niklaus. As the concession text was limited to stipulating running times, and as, in the absence of any precedent, an amendment to the concession against the wishes of the concession holder would not be feasible, further efforts were abandoned until 1914. With the outbreak of World War I, the demand for continuous operations became obsolete for the time being.

Further efforts towards continuous operation gathered force only in the mid-1920s. Zermatt hotels remained open for the first time continuously for the winter in 1927/28. Meanwhile, the VZ had recognised the importance of Zermatt for winter sports, and became more co-operative. On 30 October 1928, the VZ operated timetabled winter traffic for the first time as far as St. Niklaus. In the following winter, a single train pair ran each day as far as Zermatt, weather permitting. This mode of operation could be maintained until the end of 1930. In January and February 1931, however, numerous avalanches made regular operations impossible. It became clear that a regulated winter traffic without shelters was really not feasible. In 1932, the Canton of Valais and the VZ therefore entered into a contract relating to winter traffic. The contract provided, on the one hand, for continuous winter traffic on the VZ, and, on the other hand, obliged the Canton to subsidise the erection of shelters to the extent of 50%. The shelters were completed on time in the autumn of 1933. Thus, in the following winter continuous winter operations could be offered for the first time along the entire route.

=== World War II, the postwar period and recovery ===
Logo of the VZ to 1962.

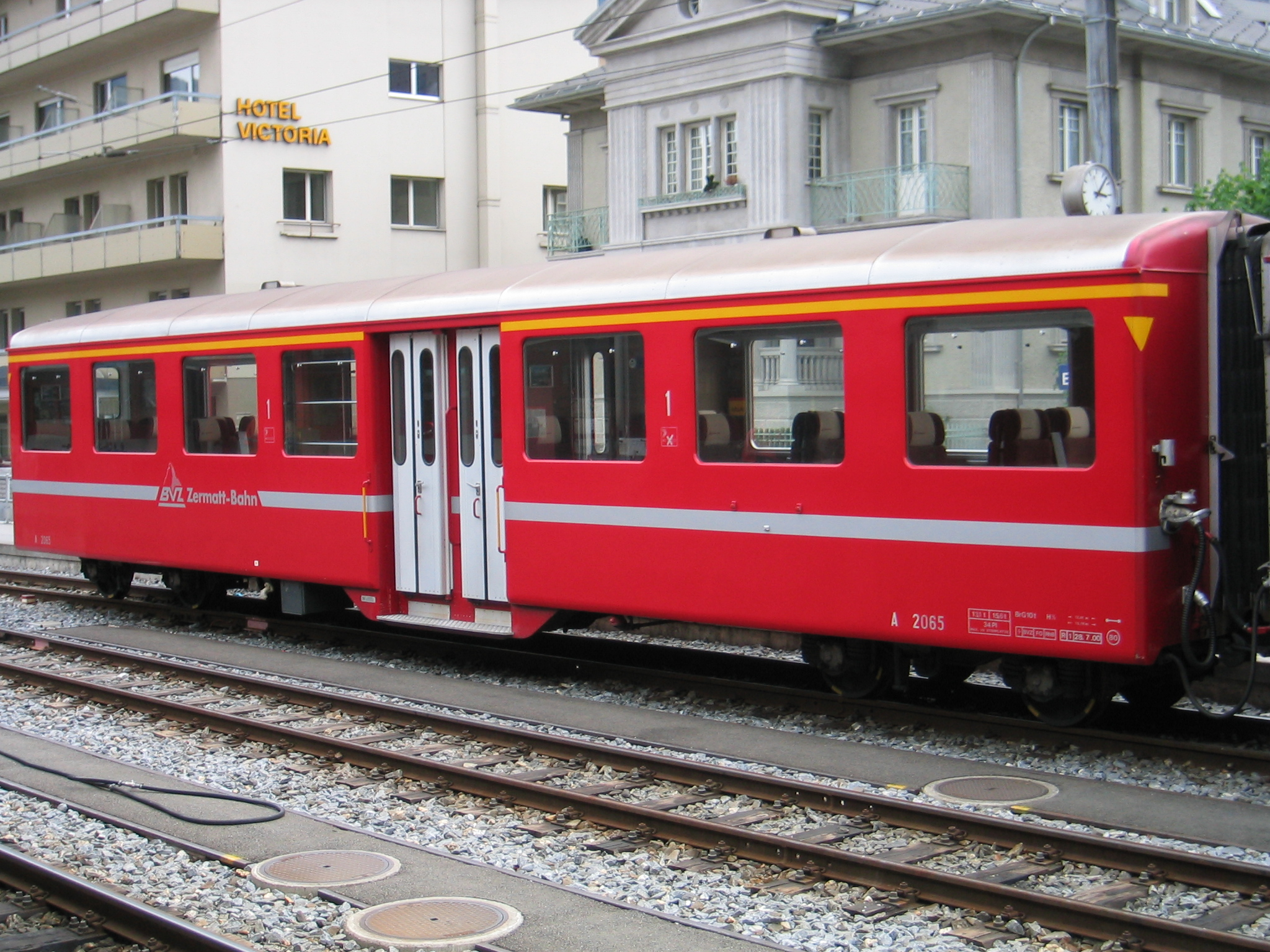
Centre entrance car A 2065 from 1961.

The outbreak of war in 1939 had a much less dramatic impact on rail traffic than had been the case in 1914. Although this time once again foreign tourists stayed away from the Mattertal, there were nevertheless Swiss excursioners who, thanks to the previously introduced income compensation, could afford to travel even during the war, along with military transport to secure the full utilisation of capacity. Thanks to electrification, the once again strongly increasing coal prices also had no further effect on rail traffic. During the war years, passenger numbers increased continuously, and in 1945, with 265,473 people transported, reached a new high point.

After the war, passenger numbers continued to rise strongly. In 1961, they surpassed the million mark for the first time, but took a short term hit in 1963, due to a typhoid epidemic in Zermatt. Also goods traffic increased, especially to serve the construction of power stations in the Saas Valley massive rises in demand in Zermatt. The VZ took advantage of the upturn to modernise rail operations gradually: between 1958 and 1989 all major bridges (apart from the Kipfenbrücke, which, after its destruction by an avalanche in 1947 was reerected as a steel bridge) were replaced by reinforced concrete structures, which enabled an increase in axle loadings.

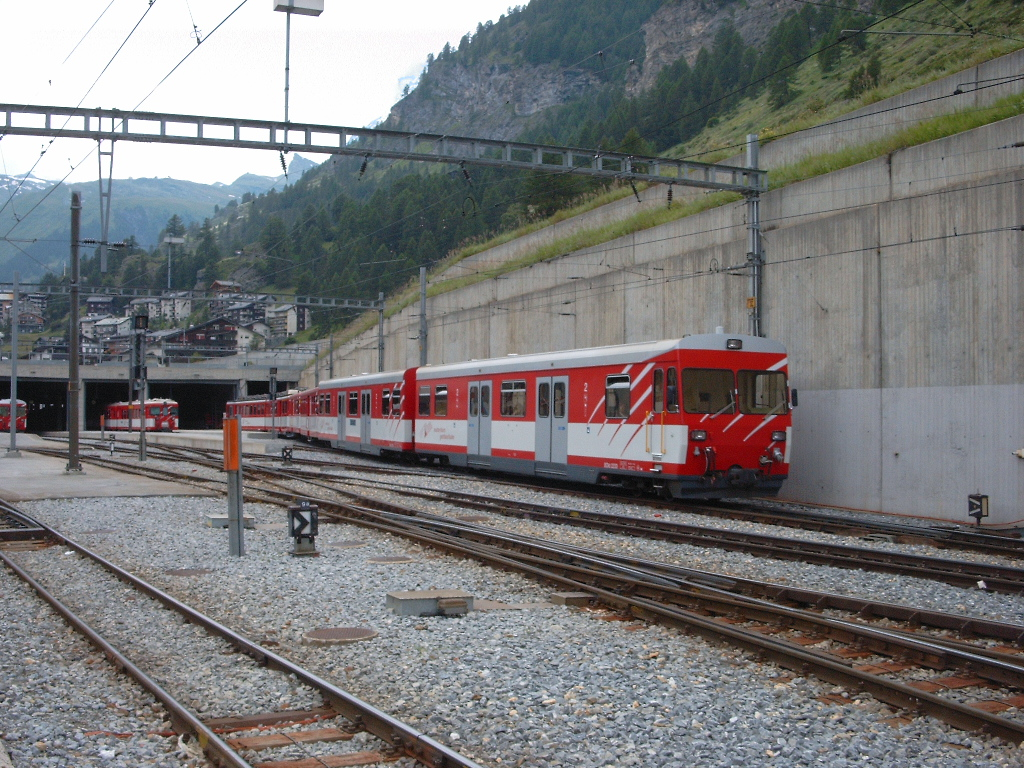
Täsch–Zermatt shuttle train.

Rolling stock was also renewed. The passenger cars, mainly still dating from the steam era, and equipped with open platform ends, were replaced between 1955 and 1963 by passenger cars of modern light steel construction with centre entrances. The locomotives from the time of electrification were supplemented between 1960 and 1965 by five passenger railcars. To increase safety, a remote controlled block signalling system was installed along the complete line from Brig between 1965 and 1966.

The avalanche shelters along the whole line were similarly continuously extended. The devastation of Zermatt station on 4 January 1966 presented the opportunity for a complete rebuild of the whole station, and the installation of avalanche proof roofing. The same year, an avalanche gallery was erected on the northern part of the station. Construction of avalanche proof roofing began in 1982 and ended in 1989.

The opening of the valley road as far as Täsch in 1971 resulted in a new focus of passenger volumes. Since then, many tourists have driven with their own cars to Täsch, where they have to change to the trains of the BVZ, as the road to Zermatt remains closed to car traffic to this day, and can only be used with special permission. To cope with the additional passenger numbers from Täsch, a commuter service was introduced in May 1972 between Täsch and Zermatt. This service has since transported around two thirds of all passengers arriving in Zermatt.

With the commissioning of four baggage railcars Deh 4/4 in 1975 and 1976, and their matching driving cars, it was possible, for the first time, to introduce shuttle trains on this important connection. Since then, trains on the entire line from Brig to Zermatt have been operated in increasing numbers as shuttle trains.

=== Further modernisation and merger with the FO ===
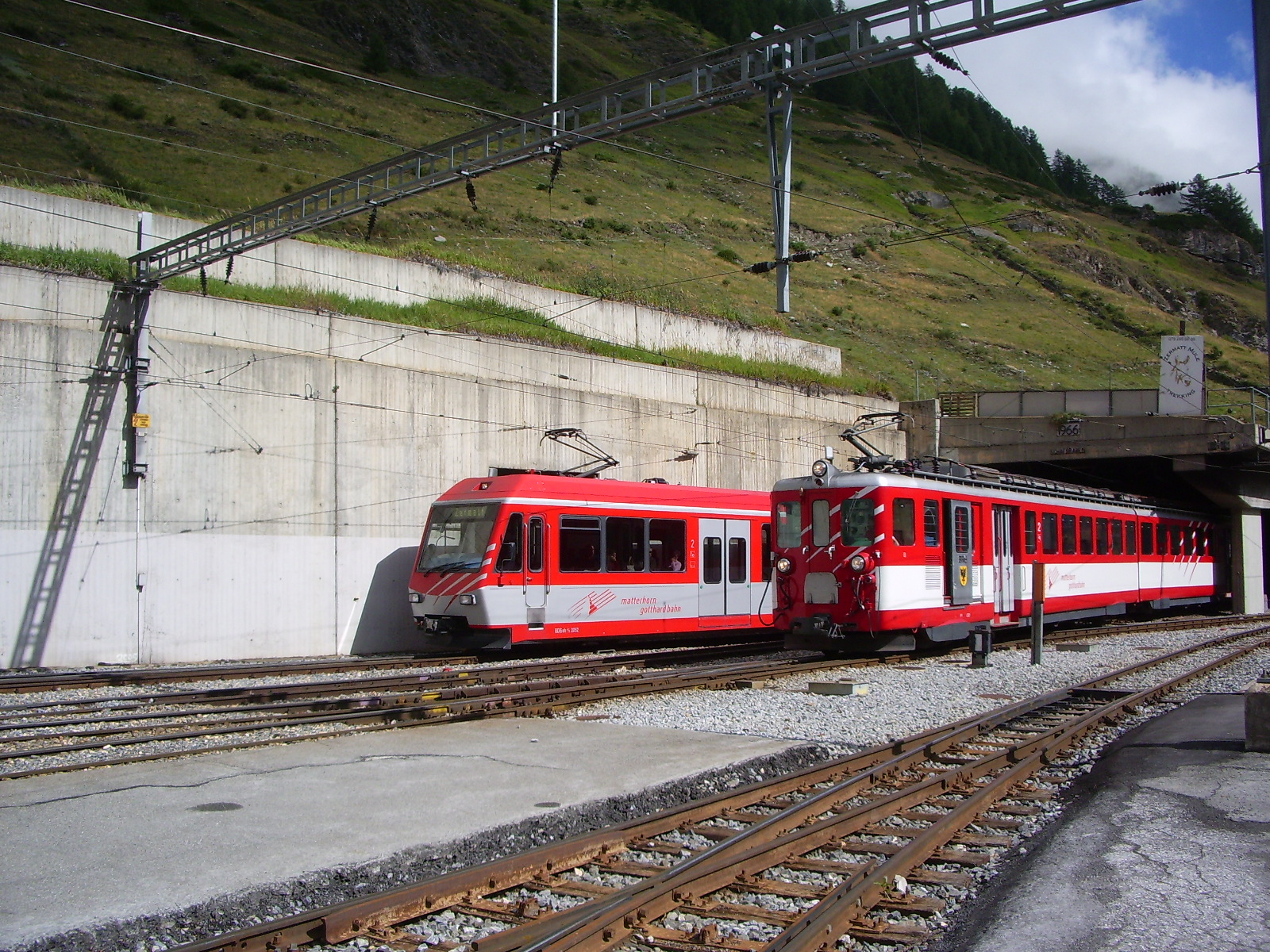
Contrasting railcars at Zermatt.

The 1980s were marked by ever increasing numbers of passengers. In particular, there was the continuing success of the Glacier Express. Running from 1982 all year round, its passenger numbers increased from about 20,000 in 1982 to 269,830 in 2005, and contributed to the utilisation of the railway and the reputation of Zermatt.

To cope with the increase in traffic, the station at Zermatt was completely rebuilt between 1982 and 1989. All of the platform tracks were given an avalanche proof canopy, and the west side of the track layout has since been bordered by a massive 300 metre long avalanche wall. The Zermatt station building, which had been in place ever since the opening of the line, was demolished and replaced by a larger new building.

A second major construction project followed between 1983 and 1984, with the erection of the Glisergrund Depot near Brig. This depot partially replaced the space-constrained depot facility at Visp station. By 1998, the Furka Oberalp Bahn had extended the Glisergrund site, by adding a further workshop hall. The complete depot site now occupies an area of around 50,000 m^{2} (540,000 sq ft).

==== The Randa landslide ====
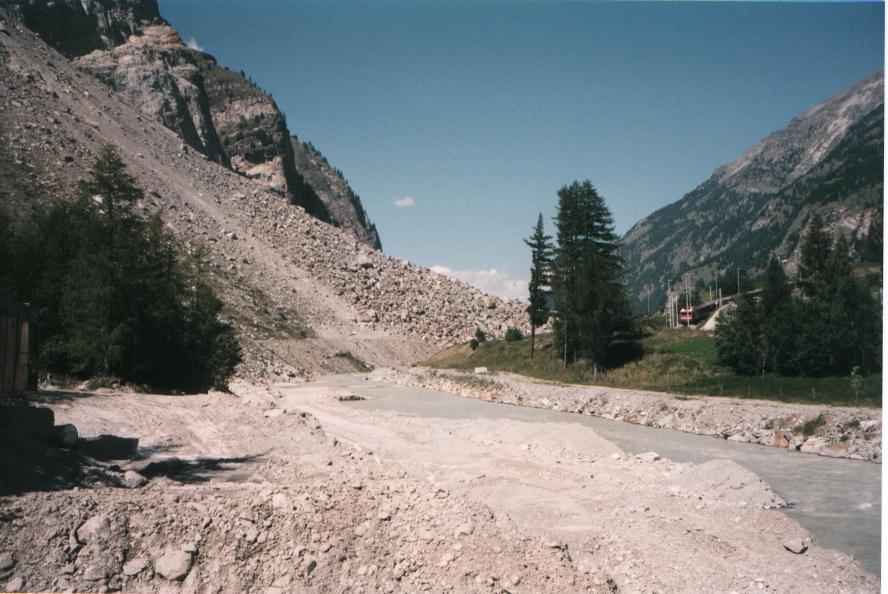
The alluvial fan of the landslide at Randa, viewed from the south. To the right of the picture is a BVZ train on the newly relaid track.

The biggest disaster in the history of the BVZ occurred in its jubilee year of 1991. On 18 April at 6.45 am, approximately 15 million cubic metres of rock broke away from the Wartfluh northwest of Randa and buried the Vispa and parts of the hamlet Lerc, along with 100 metres of railway track. No people were injured, as the hamlet Lerch was uninhabited and at the time of the landslide there was no train in the affected section of track. However, a goods train heading for Zermatt was left standing a few hundred metres north of the incident site, after its traction failed due to damage to the overhead line and the resulting short circuit. Passenger and goods traffic was temporarily moved to the road, which was left undamaged. Between Herbriggen and Randa, omnibuses operated bustitution services, and between Randa and Zermatt the trains ran in a shuttle service. As from 22 April, it was again possible to operate through goods trains, for which a diesel locomotive of type HGm 4/4 was hired from the Furka Oberalp Bahn. Passenger traffic initially remained suspended, as further landslides could not be ruled out.

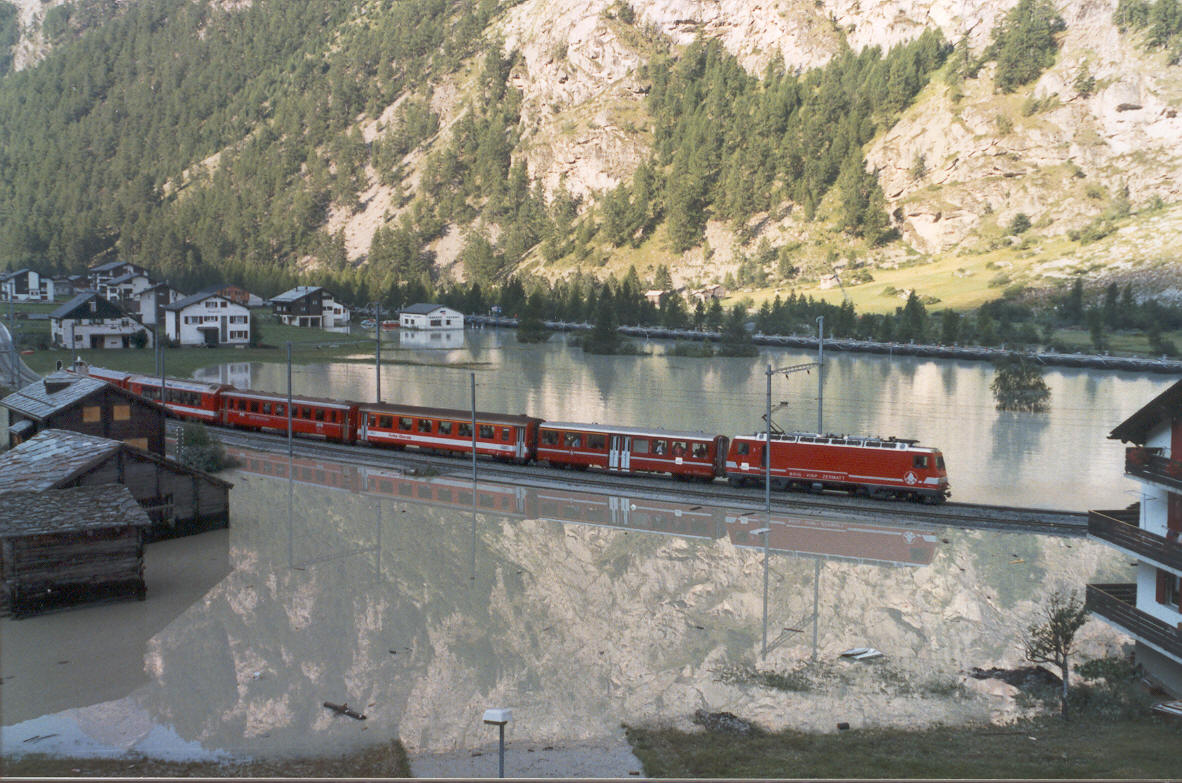
On 10 August 1991, a Glacier Express crosses the still partially flooded Randa.

On 9 May, large rocks fell into the valley once again, burying the railway tracks for 250 metres and also making the road along the valley impassable. Moreover, the alluvial fan dammed up the Vispa, causing the lower part of the hamlet slowly to become flooded. After heavy rains on 18 Juny 1991, the station was similarly left under water. Planning immediately began for a new route for rail and road that would by pass the disaster area. The new rail alignment, totalling 2860 m, was ready to be opened on 1 August 1991. However, a heavy thunderstorm on 8 August led to a blockage of the newly excavated river channel of the Vispa by washed up glacial rubble, which meant a second flooding of the station. After the water had flowed away to a sufficient extent, the rail traffic could once again be resumed on 10 August.

The total damage to the railway was valued at 16.5 Million francs, of which 13.59 Million could be alleviated by natural disaster relief under the Swiss Federal Railway Law. Due to the break in the track, which was closed for 105 days, the Jubilee festivities originally scheduled for July 1991 had to be postponed until October. During the Jubilee, the Brig-Visp-Zermatt-Bahn was renamed as the BVZ Zermatt-Bahn, to highlight more strongly the most important town on the line.

==== Transformation to the Matterhorn Gotthard Bahn ====
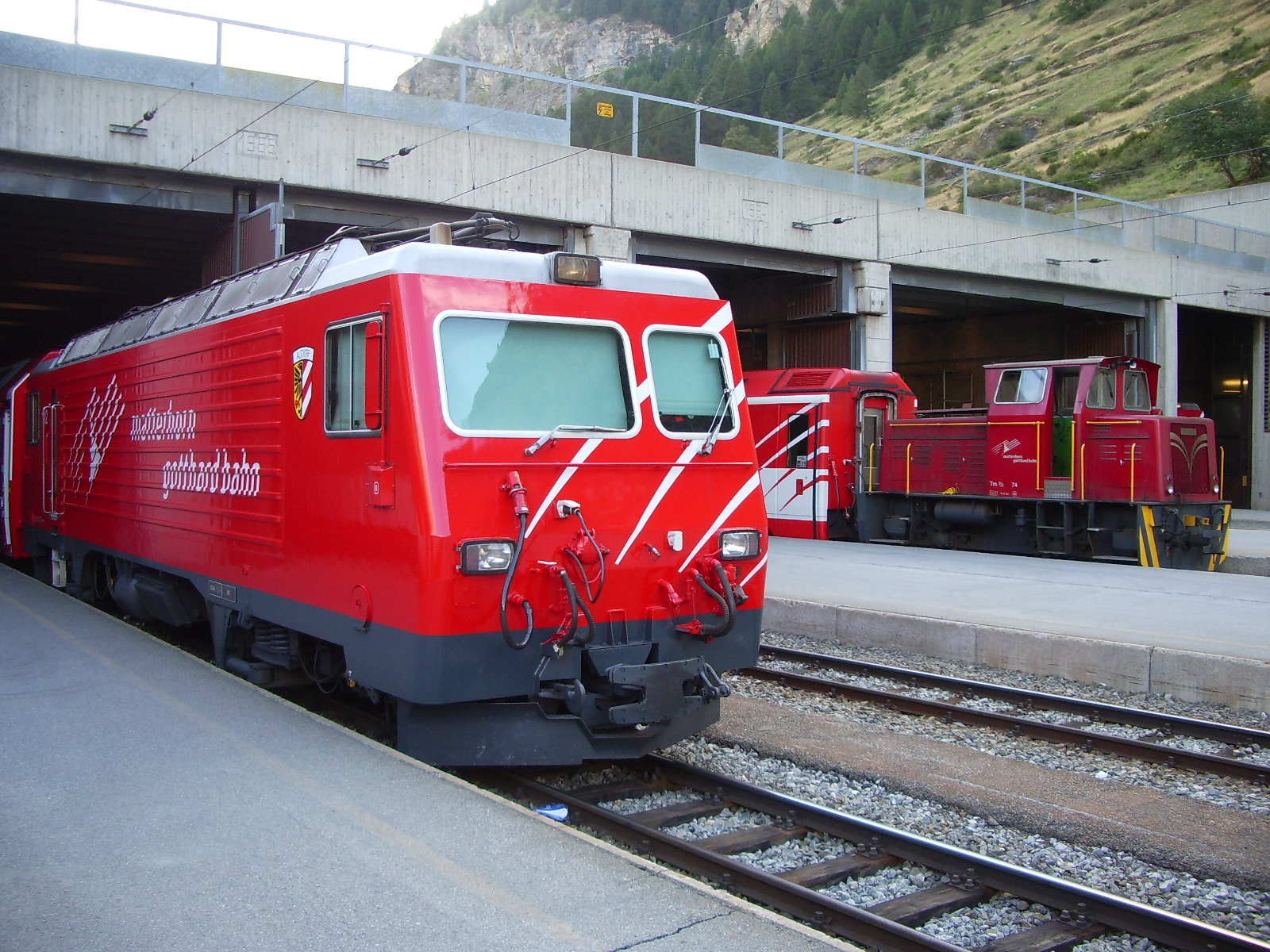
The former FO loco HGe 4/4 II 102 in its new livery at Zermatt station.

On 1 January 2003, the BVZ merged with the neighbouring Furka Oberalp Bahn to form the Matterhorn Gotthard Bahn. At the same time, the business of the two railways was split into the group companies Matterhorn Gotthard Verkehrs AG (passenger concession, rolling stock, maintenance, road traffic), Matterhorn Gotthard Infrastruktur AG (infrastructure concession, formations, buildings) and the Matterhorn Gotthard Bahn AG responsible for management of personnel and group management. All group companies belong to BVZ Holding, which has its origins in the BVZ, and ultimately to the Swiss federation and the Cantons of Valais, Uri and Grisons.

The merger of the two railways made possible the implementation of numerous development measures. By the end of 2006, the shuttle train terminal in Täsch had been fundamentally transformed, and the number of covered parking spaces increased to 1700. In connection with the opening of the Lötschberg Base Tunnel, the Visp railway station was completely rebuilt. Beginning in 2005, the MGB lines were moved from the station forecourt to points adjacent to the existing standard gauge tracks so as to minimise the walking distances for transferring passengers.

== Description of the line ==
=== Brig–Visp ===
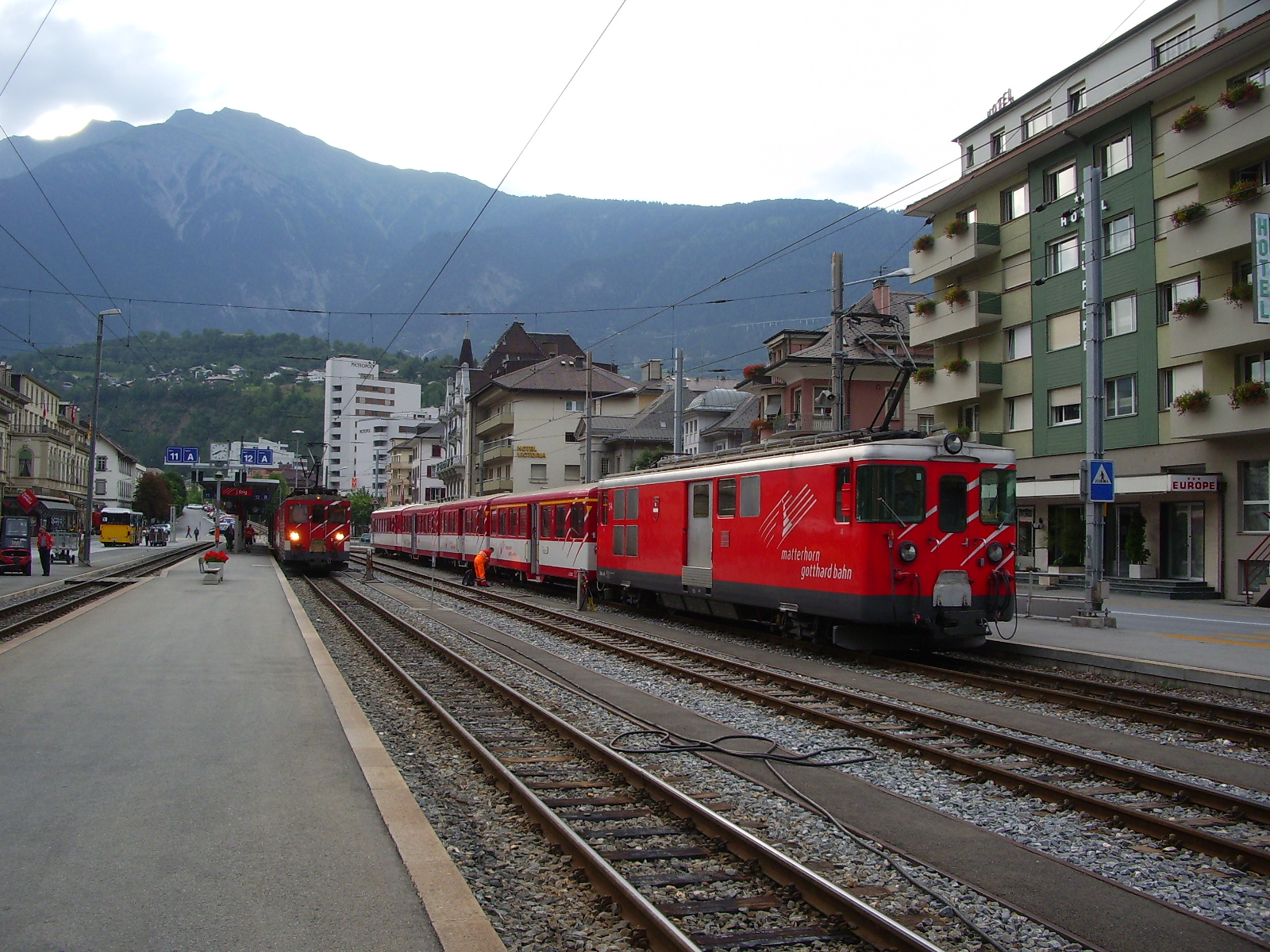
Brig station with shuttle trains to Andermatt (left) and Zermatt (right).

Since 1930, the starting point for the line to Zermatt has been Brig station. Until the merger of the two railways, the metre gauge part of this station was owned by the FO, and the BVZ therefore had to pay a fee for using it. Erected in 1915 by the then Brig-Furka-Disentis-Bahn, Brig's metre gauge station extends over three platform tracks and is located at the forecourt of Brig's standard gauge station, where there are connections with BLS and SBB trains heading towards the Lötschberg, Lake Geneva and Simplon Tunnel. With the opening of the Lötschberg base tunnel, a large portion of the travellers changing for Zermatt now make the change at Visp. Brig's metre gauge station is now a through station. Its previous configuration as a terminal station came to an end with the opening of new tracks leading from the metre gauge station directly to the east towards Goms. The new track formation, which was first used on 1 December 2007, replaced a section through Naters that was equipped with many level crossings. Currently, the town of Brig is seeking the complete removal of the narrow gauge system from the station forecourt, and its incorporation into the standard gauge station.

Along the line to Visp there were, in earlier times, an FO depot and a train shed also used by the BVZ. These facilities were closed down in 2001. Nearby, the line crosses the Saltina on an iron bridge dating from 1930. Thereafter, the metre gauge line runs largely parallel to the SBB's standard gauge Rhonetalstrecke, along the southern bank of the Rhone. West of the Brig suburb of Glis there is the (ex BVZ) Glisergrund Depot, erected between 1984 and 1998, and Glisergrund Workshops (ex FO), which together now accommodate a large portion of the MGB's rolling stock. Approximately four kilometres west of Brig is the Gamsensand passing loop, which also has freight sidings for the loading of tank wagons. The former Gamsen station was about 300 metres east of the passing loop. This station was abandoned at the beginning of the 1990s, after the cable car to Mund, which started from there, was shut down.

The next stop, Eyholz, is already in the municipal area of Visp. This stop was created in 1999 and serves primarily to connect the line with a nearby shopping centre. Soon after Eyholz, the line enters Visp, passes the sprawling industrial premises of the Lonza Group and after about nine kilometres reaches Visp station. The length of line just traversed passes through a shallow gap, and between Brig and Visp climbs about 21 metres in altitude.

=== Visp–Stalden ===
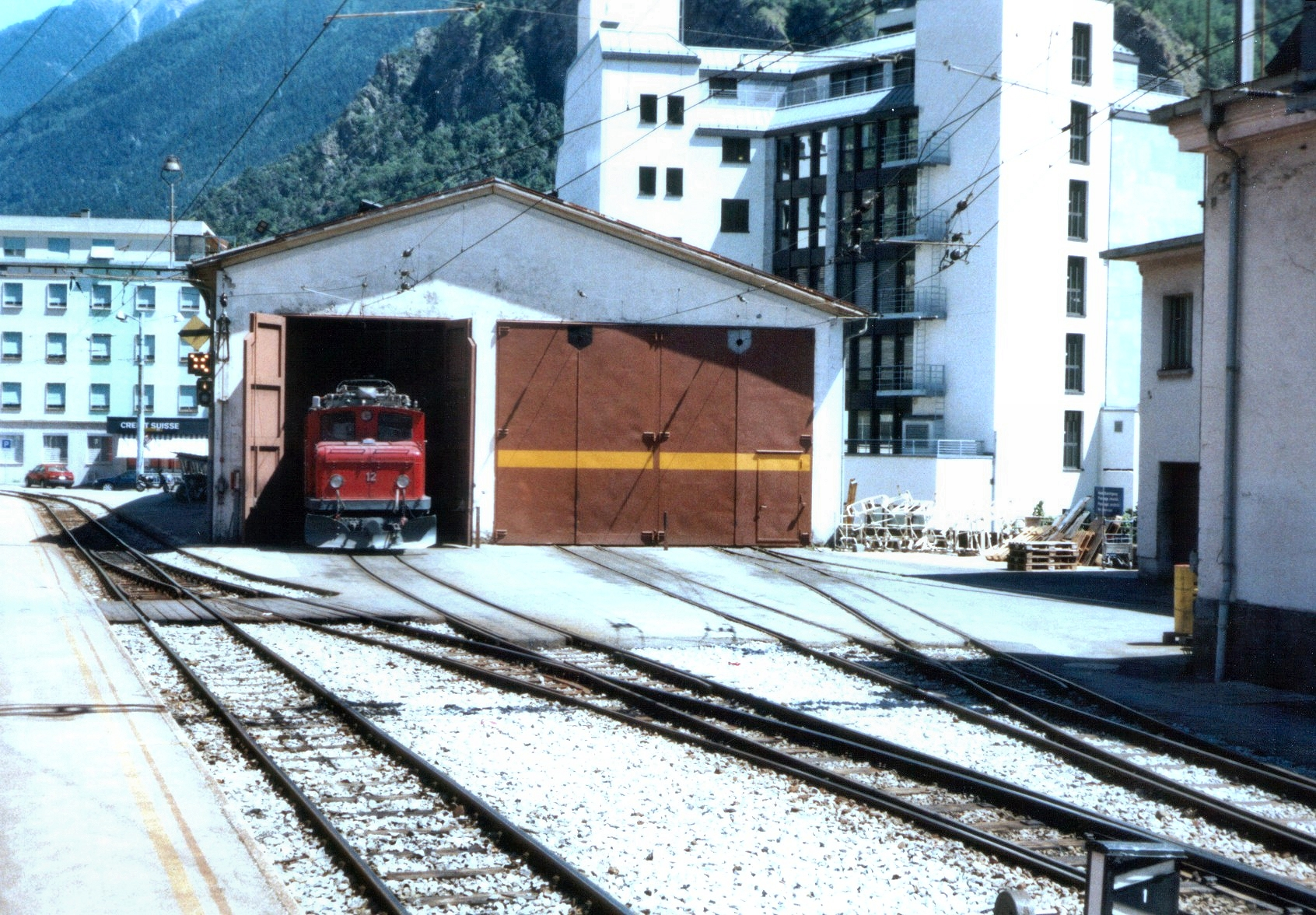
The Crocodile HGe 4/4 Nr. 12 in the Visp engine shed (demolished in 2005).

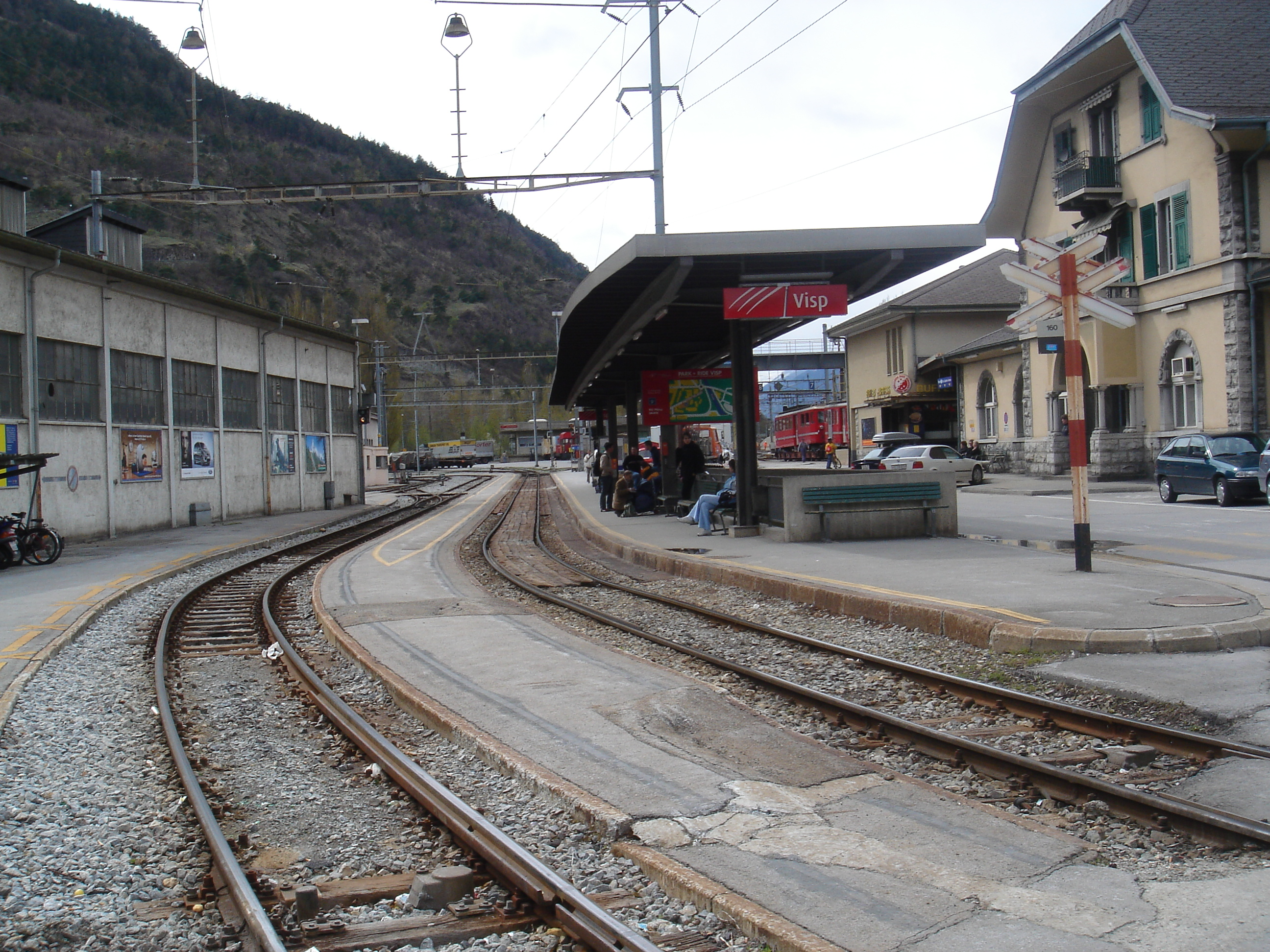
The old station layout at Visp, April 2004.

The metre gauge station at Visp was originally located, as at Brig, in the forecourt of the SBB station building. South of the two metre gauge platform tracks there used to be a connection to the extensive depot and workshop facilities of the BVZ. For passenger traffic, the VZ had already erected a wooden shelter by the start of operations in 1890, and, even at that point, all of the other necessary facilities, such as toilets or a waiting hall, were provided within the standard gauge station building of the Jura-Simplon (until 1889, the Suisse Occidentale-Simplon).

A fundamental renovation of the station complex began in 2006. As it had been foreseen that, following the completion of the Lötschberg Base Tunnel, the majority of the passengers would change in Visp for trains to Zermatt, the narrow gauge and standard gauge tracks were relocated closer together. Ever since then, three platforms have been available to MGB trains. Narrow gauge track 3 is located immediately adjacent to the new standard gauge track 4. The station building and the entire BVZ depot area were demolished in parallel. All subsequent maintenance of railway vehicles has been carried out exclusively in the Glisergrund workshop. The ceremonial opening of the new junction station took place on 16 and 17 May 2008.

The track exits Visp station in a tight left hand curve, and the formation also passes into a steep decline, to pass under main road no 9. The underpass, erected between 1972 and 1975, also represents the lowest point of the entire line. The track then soon leaves the Rhone valley, and enters the Mattertal, leading through to the terminus at Zermatt. Here, the formation rises only slightly, in parallel to the valley road on the eastern side of the valley, as far as the village of Ackersand. The local stop there no longer serves the public, but is still required for rail traffic as a passing point. For a long time, a neighbouring hydroelectric station was served by a siding from this local stop.

Immediately afterwards, the railway crosses the Vispa by means of a concrete bridge erected in 1974. Shortly thereafter, the first rack section begins. This soon leads the formation along the western flank of the valley at the maximum gradient of 12.5 percent, and the line quickly reaches the station at Stalden-Saas.

=== Stalden–St. Niklaus ===
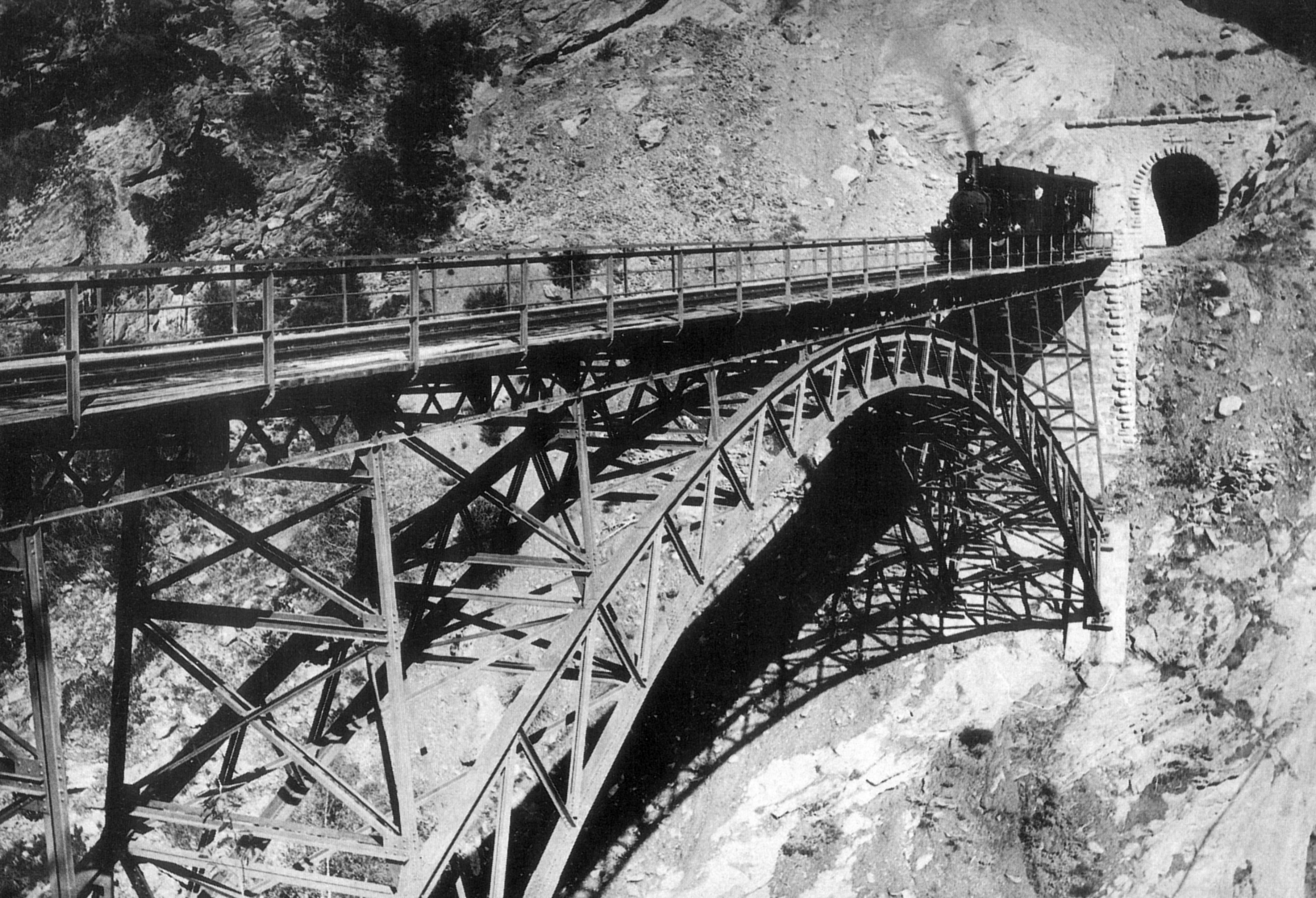
The old Mühlebachviadukt, demolished in 1959.

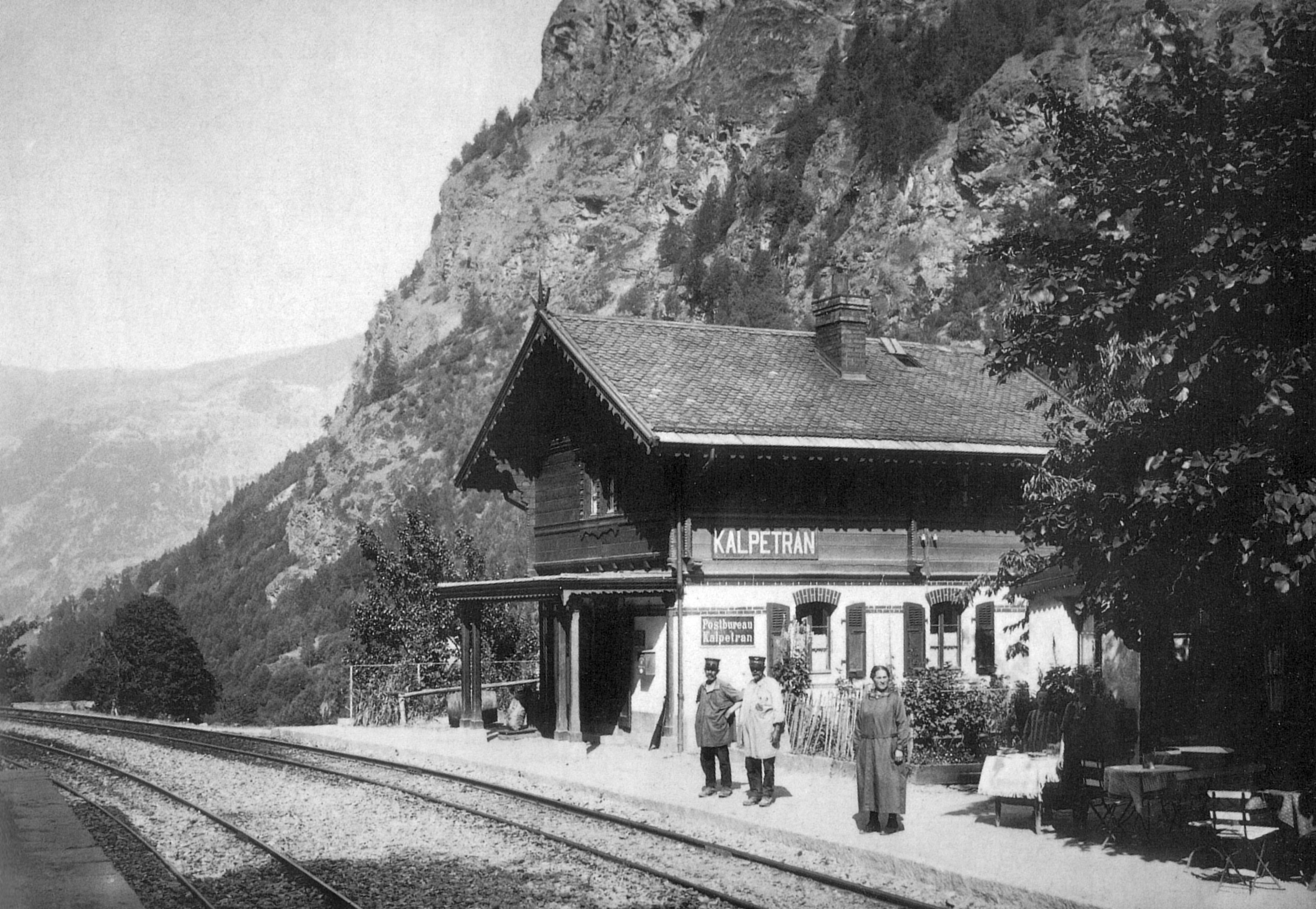
Kalpetran station, circa 1891.

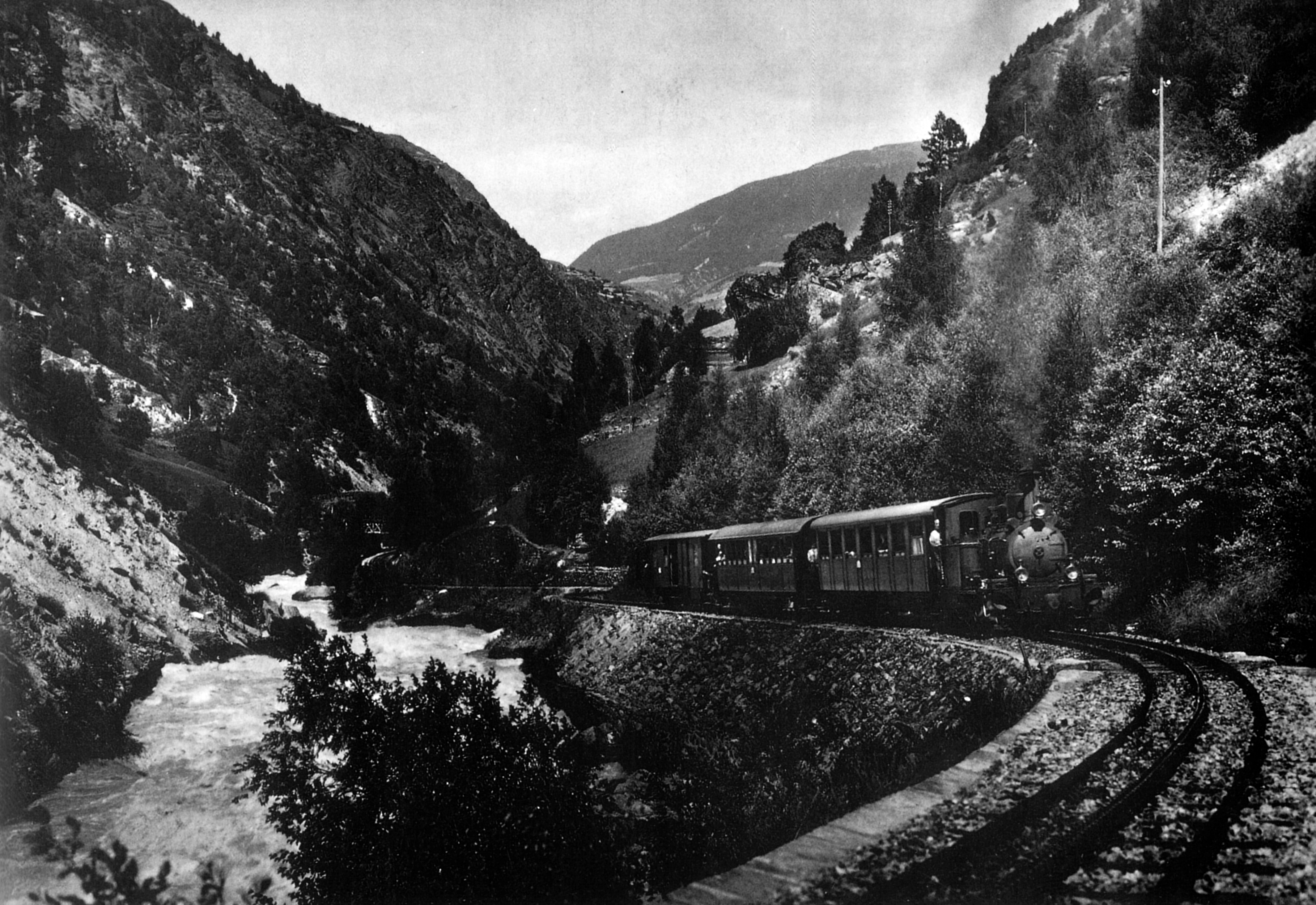
VZ train circa 1900 in the Kipfenschlucht.

The station at Stalden, at around 799 metres above sea level, extends in an s-shape along the southwestern edge of the village. For a long time, the station itself was of great importance, as the departure point of the Postbus line into the Saastal. It was therefore equipped with a generously sized station building, the second largest on the line after the one in Zermatt. At the start of the 20th century, there were plans to build another railway line to Saas-Fee that would branch off here from the existing line; World War I, however, thwarted these plans. The importance of the station (which, since 1931, has had the official name Stalden-Saas) has decreased since the 1950s, as the departure point since then for the Postbus line has been Brig, not Stalden. Nevertheless, the buses still stop also at Stalden station, and form a connection there with the trains to Zermatt. Immediately adjacent to the railway tracks there is also the base station of the cable car to Staldenried. Since 1986, the two tracks at Stalden have been equipped with continuous rack rails, as there are inclines immediately before and after the station. In addition to the two platform tracks there is also a loading track for goods traffic.

The rack section, which begins at Ackersand, extends for a few hundred metres past Stalden. The line continues from there over a relatively flat section, along the right side of the increasingly narrowing valley, while the Vispa flows about 150 metres lower down, through a narrow gorge. The following section displays the first still relatively short tunnels, as well as the largest bridge on the line. The 67-metre-long Mühlebachviadukt spans its eponymous waters at a height of 43 metres. Its original steel truss structure was replaced in 1959 by a reinforced concrete arch bridge.

At 19.8 kilometres, the station at Kalpetran is finally reached. The actual site has only a few buildings, the main function of the station being to allow connections with the cable car linking the station to the mountain village of Embd. Behind the station, the railway line meets the Mattervispa again, and switches to the left side of the valley. The Kipfenbrücke located here has had to be rebuilt several times: the original 30 metre long steel truss structure was destroyed in 1945 by an avalanche. A subsequent temporary measure was replaced in 1947 by a steel fish belly girder bridge, which, in turn, was itself destroyed by an avalanche in 1999. A steel girder bridge erected as a replacement was replaced in autumn 2007 by a 146-metre-long concrete bridge further downstream. The latest bridge also serves the road to Kalpetran. With the opening of a new rail section here totalling 1.2 km, the last 80 metre radius curves remaining on the open line were eliminated.

A few metres behind the Kipfenbrücke the second rack section begins. The next part of the route, through the Kipfenschlucht, is considered to be the most scenic portion of the entire line. The railway and the Vispa run here in a most confined space, adjacent to each other. This whole section has been repeatedly damaged by flooding and avalanches, sometimes severely. To avoid further damage, the Vispa has therefore been increasingly regulated since the end of the 19th century, and the line formation protected by solid masonry. In the middle of the gorge, the fully automatic crossing point at Kipferwald was set up in 1999. The upper end of the Kipfenschlucht is marked by the Sellibrücke, on which the Vispa is crossed for the third time. Shortly thereafter, the racks and the formation travel along the right side of the widening valley to St. Niklaus, at 1126 metres above sea level. Since Stalden, a total of 327 m in altitude have been climbed.

=== St. Niklaus–Randa ===
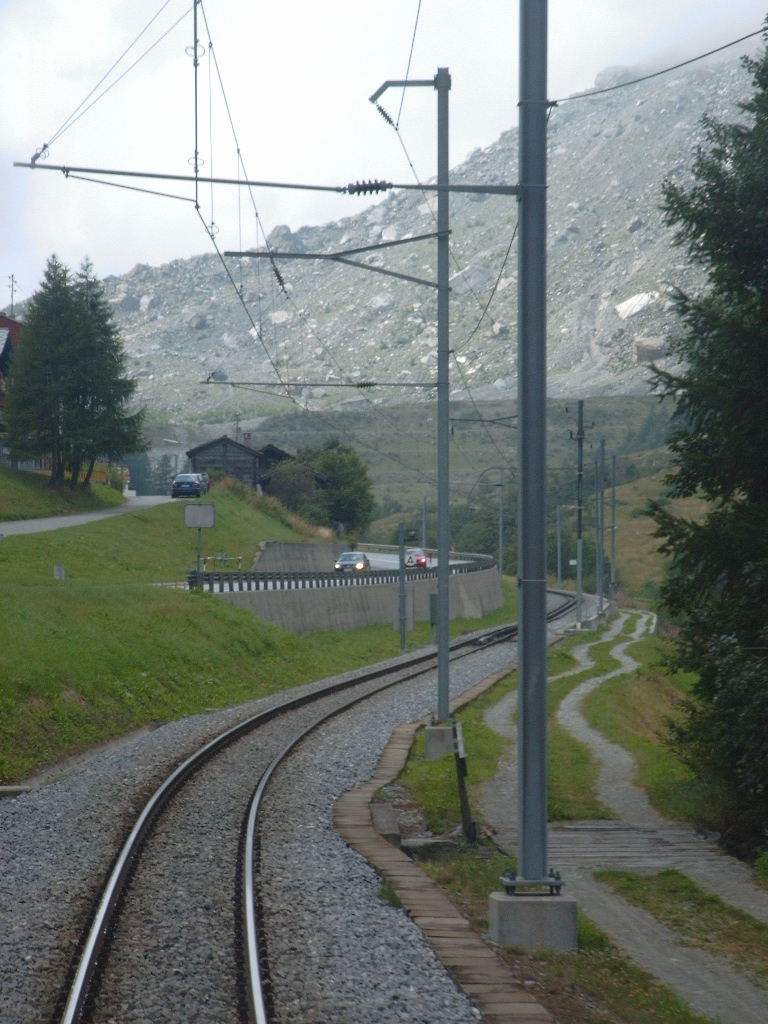
The Randa landslide, viewed from the north.

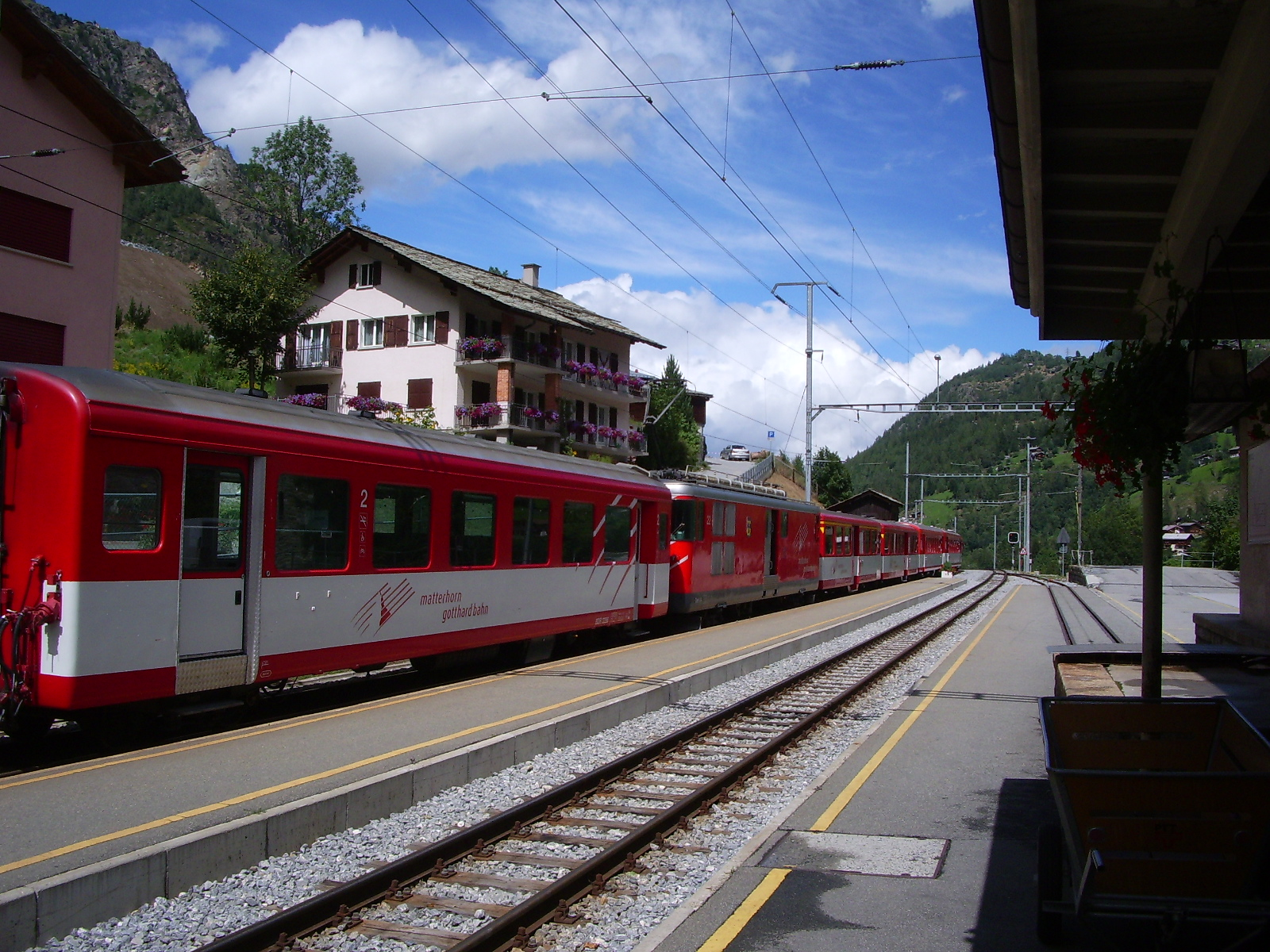
St. Niklaus station

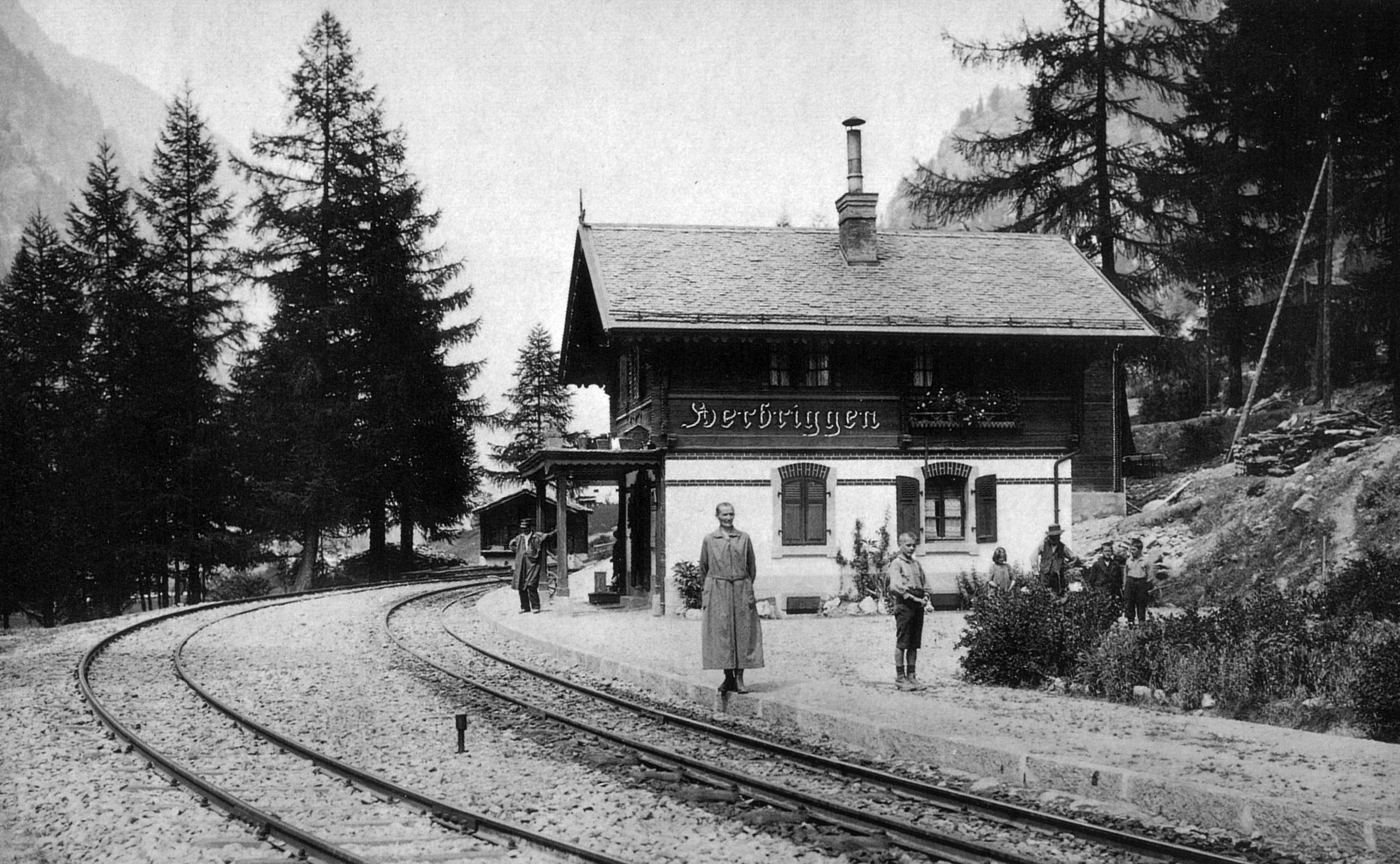
Bahnhof Herbriggen circa 1891.

The St. Niklaus station extends along the western edge of the town, and has two platform tracks and a siding with a loading dock. The station building represents a standard type, which can also be found in similar form in Täsch. St Niklaus station is the terminus of the post bus line to the holiday resort of Grächen, which extends on a plateau along the left side of the valley, and is connected with the valley by meandering road.

Shortly after St Niklaus station, the next rack section starts. This leads up to the Blattbachtunnel, a 130-metre-long avalanche protection structure erected in 1931. The original uncovered stretch of line at this point had to be abandoned, as the railway bridge over the Blattbach had been destroyed many times by avalanches and flooding since it was first constructed. To circumvent the problem area, a tunnel vault was created in open cut form, and then covered with earth. At the same time, and by the same means, the exit of the third rack rail section could be protected from bad weather.

In connection with that tunnel, the line moves once again into the valley, and passes the balancing reservoir of a hydroelectric power station at Herbriggen. In close proximity is the crossing station Mattsand, which was built in 1956 for the construction of the power station, and has been used since 1964 for train crossings. The nearby Herbriggen station has, apart from two platform tracks, a connecting track for a substation associated with the power station. The original station building no longer exists; it was replaced in 1966 by a new structure.

The next section of line to Randa is shaped primarily by the landslide of 1991, which buried 250 metres of the then existing line and necessitated extensive new line construction. Behind Herbriggen, the line initially follows the course of the Vispa in the middle of the valley. Shortly before the alluvial fan, however, the line curves sharply to the left and runs together with the valley road at the extreme edge of the valley floor, in order to avoid the area of land threatened by possible further landslides. South of the alluvial fan, the formation descends at a gradient of 120% and returns to the original route along the Vispa. The entire bypass section is equipped with racks. Since 1991, this has also been the only location where a rack is required for trains heading towards Zermatt.

=== Randa–Zermatt ===
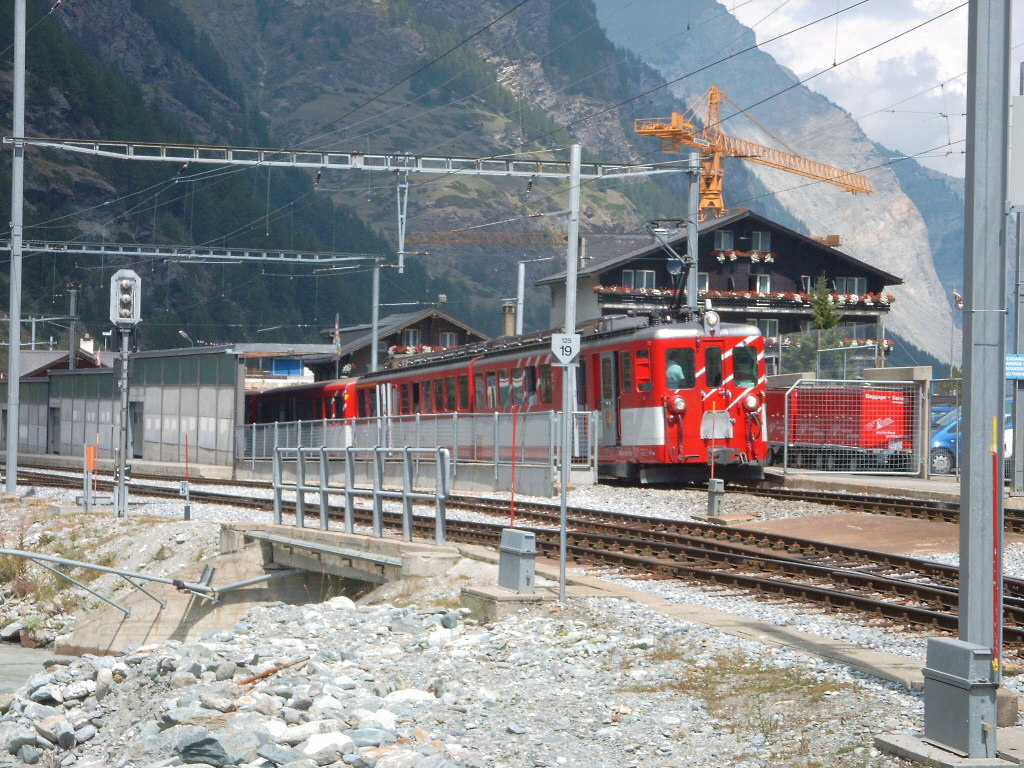
Shuttle train to Zermatt in the old Täsch station.

At Randa, the railway line runs along the western edge of the town. The station has two platform tracks and a goods track. The station building dates from the line's opening in 1891, and to this day has been rebuilt only slightly. South of Randa, the line passes the hamlet Wildi, where from 1960 to 1966 there was a loading track for the construction of the Grande Dixence power station. The line then meets up with the Mattervispa once again, and runs further on the route to Täsch directly parallel with the river along the valley floor.

The station at Täsch has been particularly important since the 1970s, as the end point of the part of the valley road available for use by motor vehicles. Originally a simple two track crossing station, the Täsch station site was expanded in 1975 by the addition of a separate platform track for shuttle trains to Zermatt. At the same time, the 1891 station building received a modern extension housing a ticket office, while the fields surrounding the station were transformed into parking spaces.

Beginning in 2005, the whole Täsch station complex was later comprehensively reconstructed. Under the name Matterhorn Terminal Täsch, there arose a three-storey parking garage with 2,000 parking spaces, and a ticket counter. Meanwhile, the original station building and the shuttle train platform were demolished. The new station facility consists of two tracks for through traffic, and a two track platform area for the shuttle trains. To the east, there is now also an attached covered parking place for coaches.

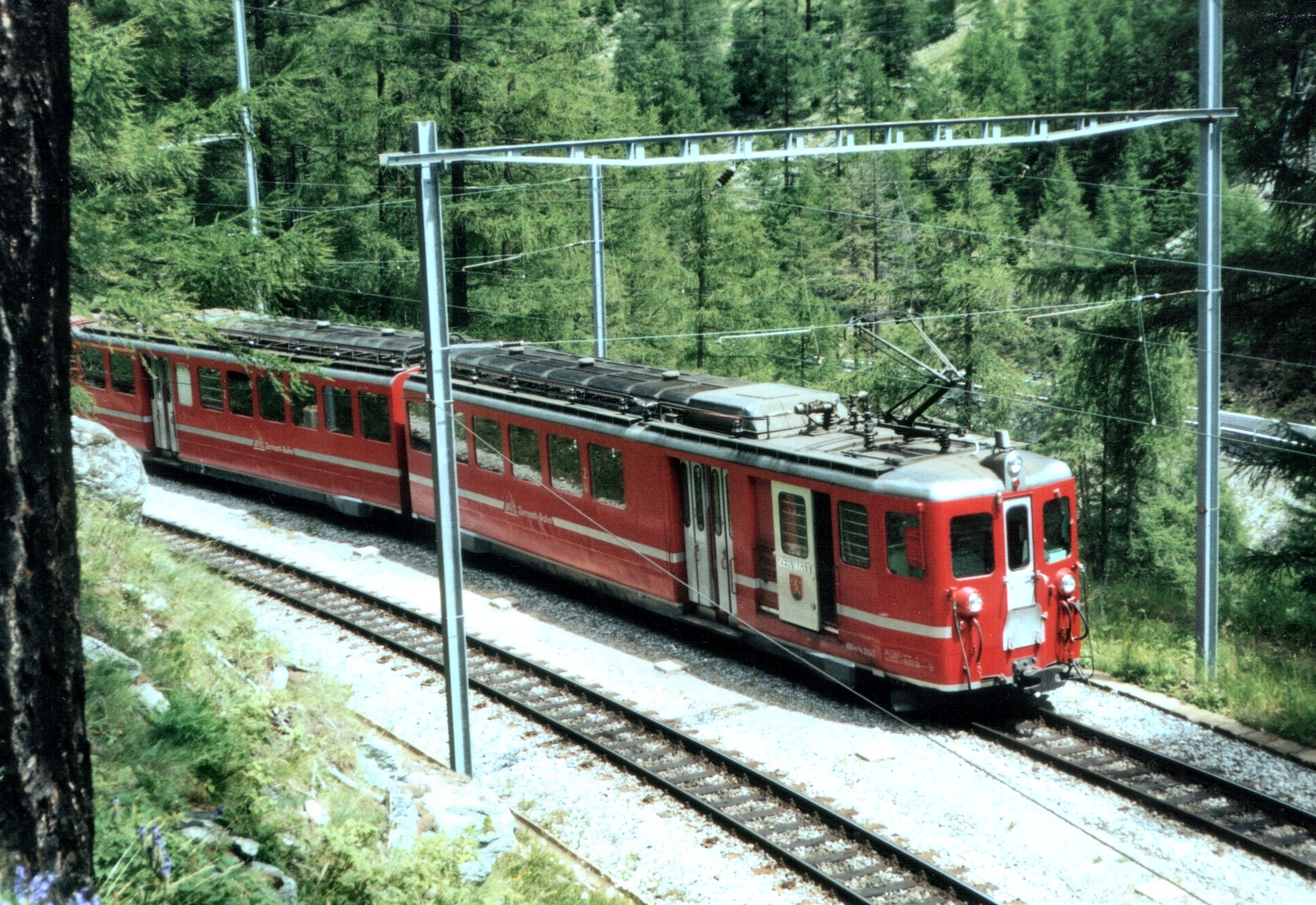
Passenger train with ABDeh 8/8 in the Kalter Boden siding.

Behind Täsch the railway line initially continues to follow the course of the Mattervispa. Immediately prior to the Täschsandbrücke, newly erected in concrete in 1964, and over which the line switches for the last time to the right side of the valley, is the Täschsand crossing point, which was introduced in the summer of 2007 to increase the line's capacity. At that point, the fifth and last rack section begins, and starts to address the final few metres to be climbed to Zermatt. While the river increasingly disappears into a gorge, the railway line runs along the right valley slope. Between Täsch and Zermatt, most of the line is protected by avalanche galleries: of 5,612 metres of track, 2,221 metres are covered by structures or tunnel roofs.

At about the halfway point between Täsch and Zermatt, there is the Kalter Boden crossing point, opened in 1972 simultaneously with the introduction of shuttle services. Here the last rack section ends. Due to the heavy usage of this section of the line, almost all trains must wait there, to cross with a train operating in the opposite direction.

After about two kilometres, the track finally reaches the northern border of Zermatt. Here there is a loading track for concrete and other building materials, devoted to the supply of Zermatt's builders. The nearby short Spissfluhtunnel passes below the Air Zermatt heliport, and shortly after, the line reaches Zermatt station.

==== Zermatt railway station ====
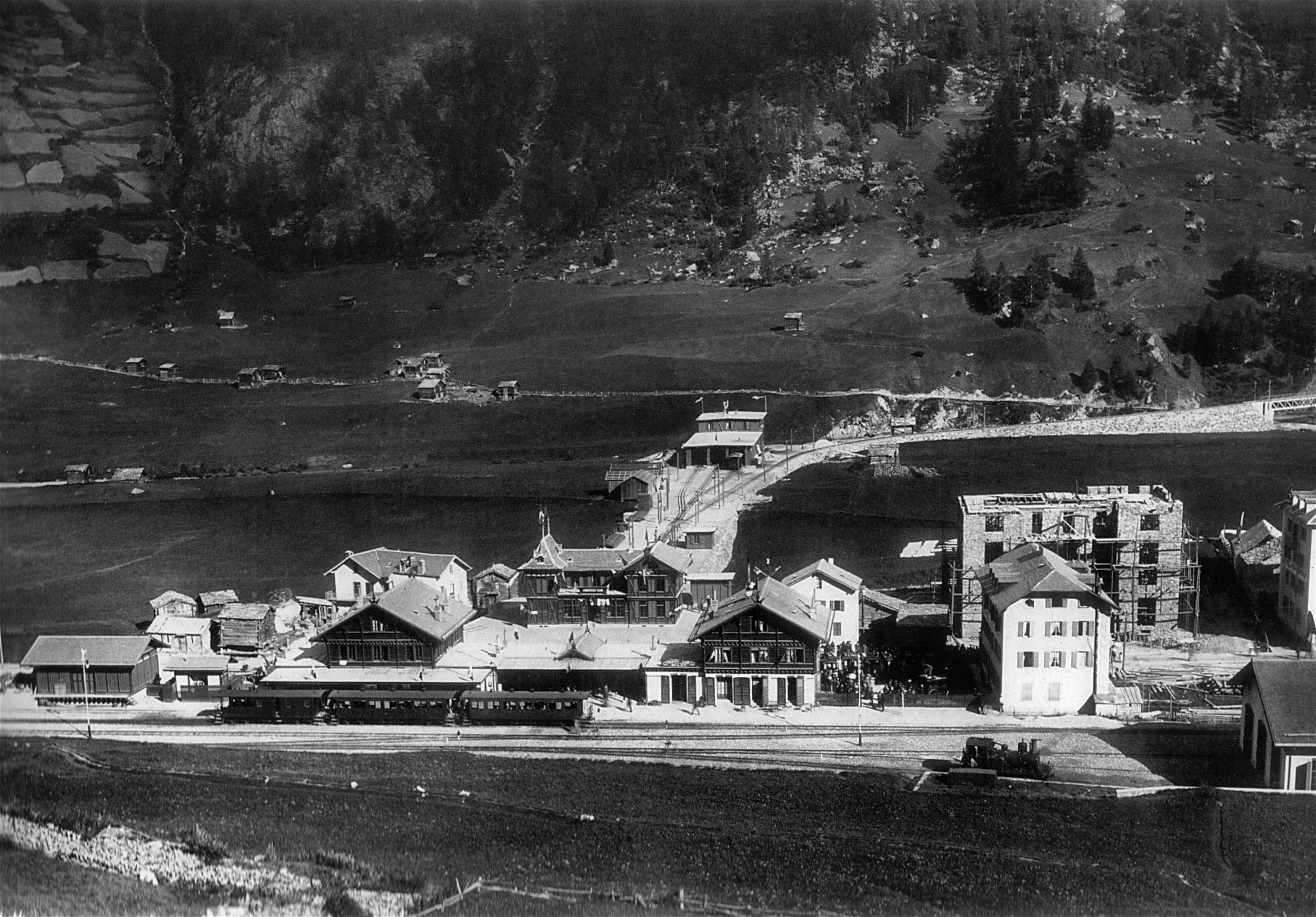
Zermatt railway station, circa 1900.

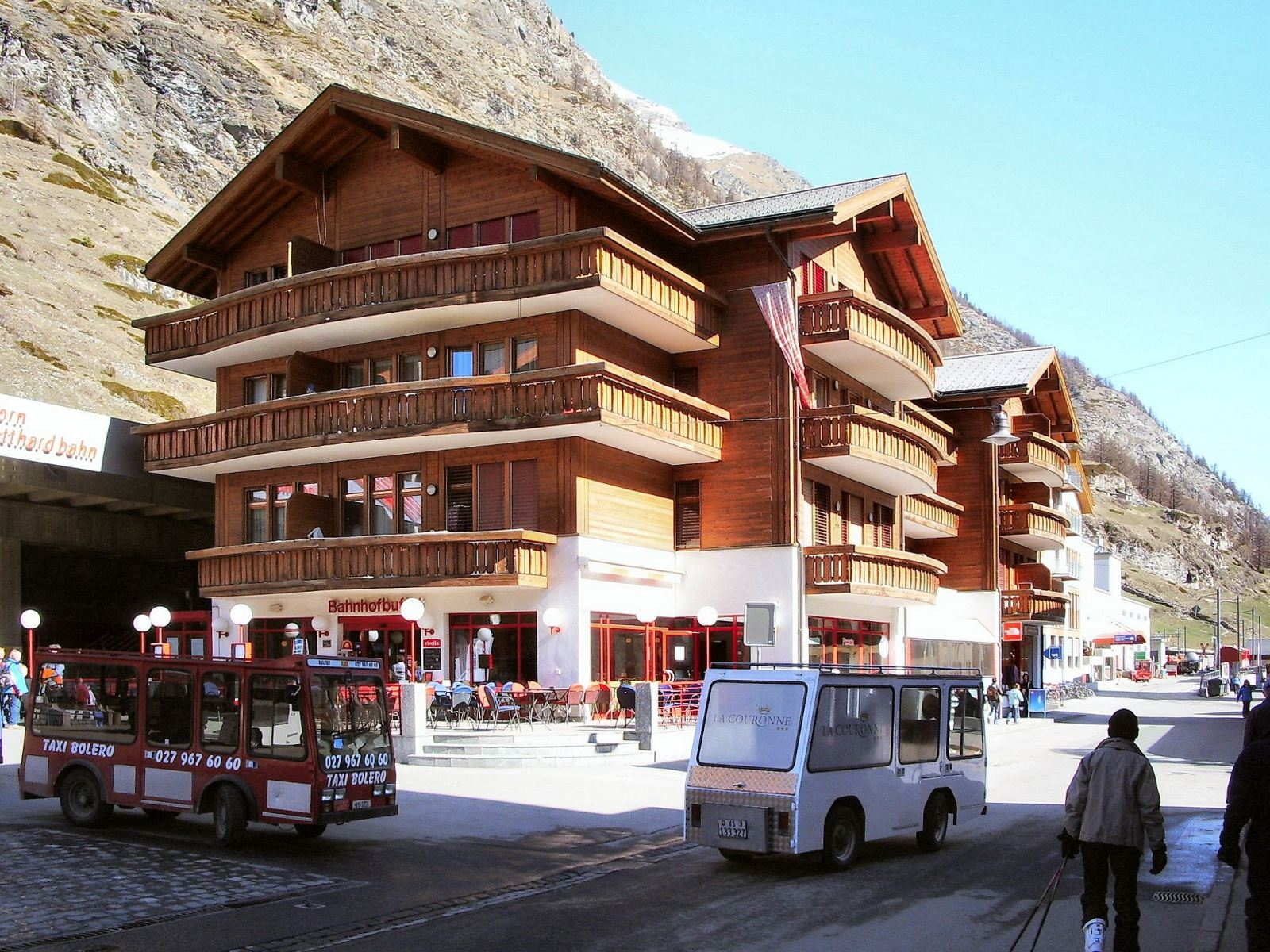
Zermatt's Bahnhofsplatz and station building.

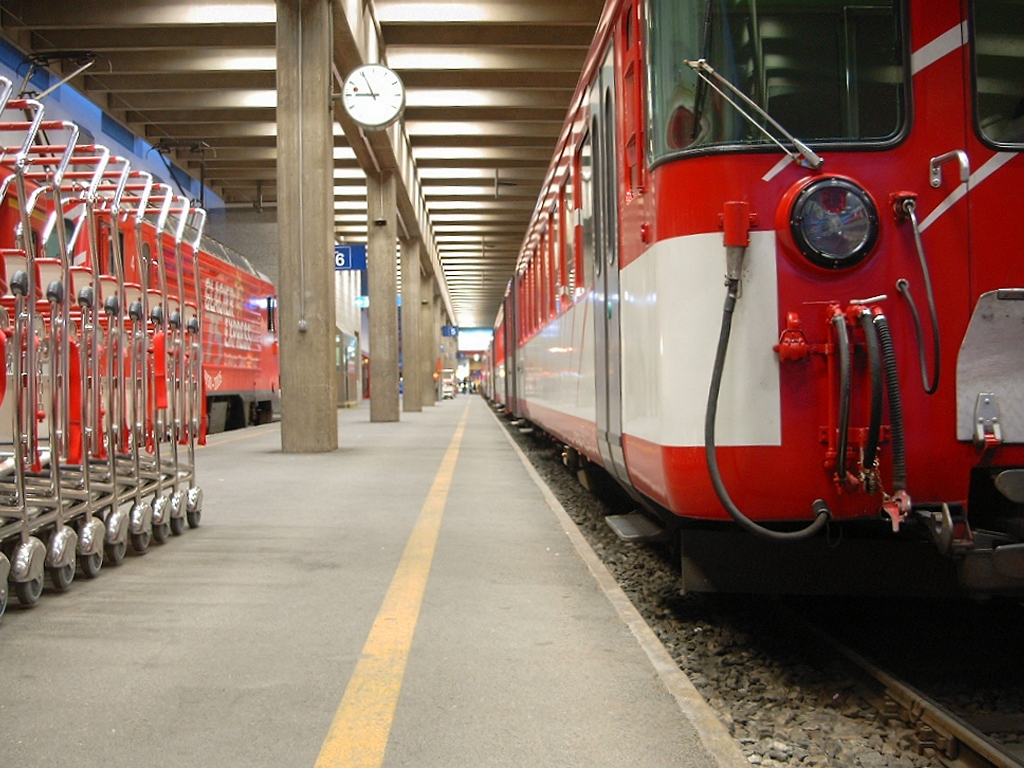
Zermatt's station concourse.

The appearance of Zermatt railway station is characterised by 1980s era alterations. To protect passengers and rolling stock from avalanches, a massive concrete canopy was erected by 1989, and the canopy spans a total of six tracks. Track 1, which is located on the western side of the station, is equipped with an inspection pit, and is not open to the public. Here, the main task is the maintenance of the shuttle trains to and from Täsch. Track 2 has been set up for the shuttle traffic to Täsch, and is used according to the Spanish solution, with both sides equipped with platforms to allow a rapid exchange of passengers. Tracks 3 to 5 serve the regular traffic to Brig, and each has its own platform. Track 6 serves mainly cargo traffic, and ends at the baggage hall of the station building. It is shorter than the other tracks, but is also provided with a common platform with track 6.

The present day station building was erected at the start of the 1990s, in the regional timber built style. In its proportions, it resembles the former station building from 1891, and is divided into three areas. The southern part includes, amongst other things, the station restaurant, while in the central part of the building can be found the ticket office and baggage claim. The north side is located next to the baggage hall, which is a concrete structure. The Gornergratbahn station is on the opposite side of the road. It is connected to the MGB station by rail link, over which goods traffic and rolling stock transfers are handled.

North of the MGB station is an extensive layout of tracks, which are utilised primarily for goods traffic and the storage of vehicles. Since soon after the 1966 avalanche, the station throat has been covered by a massive avalanche gallery. This so-called Schafgrabengalerie (sheep's grave gallery) is laid out with two tracks, and also allows avalanche-safe storage of vehicles. To the east of this gallery are open sidings, which can be used only to a limited extent in winter due to the risk of avalanches.

== Timetable ==
The timetable for 2007 provided 15 train pairs daily between Brig and Zermatt. Apart from the trains in the early morning and late evening, a service at hourly intervals was offered, and trains stopped at all stations. In the 2009 timetable, services were operated at times at half-hourly intervals, occasionally only on winter Saturdays. The total travelling time from Brig to Zermatt is 79 minutes, in the opposite direction 81 minutes. During the high season from May to October, in addition to the normal train offerings, four Glacier Express trains were operated in each direction. These stopped only in Zermatt, Visp, Brig, and in some cases also in St. Niklaus.

Additional shuttle trains operated between Täsch and Zermatt from 5:50 hours to 2:20 hours at 20-minute intervals.

== Goods traffic ==
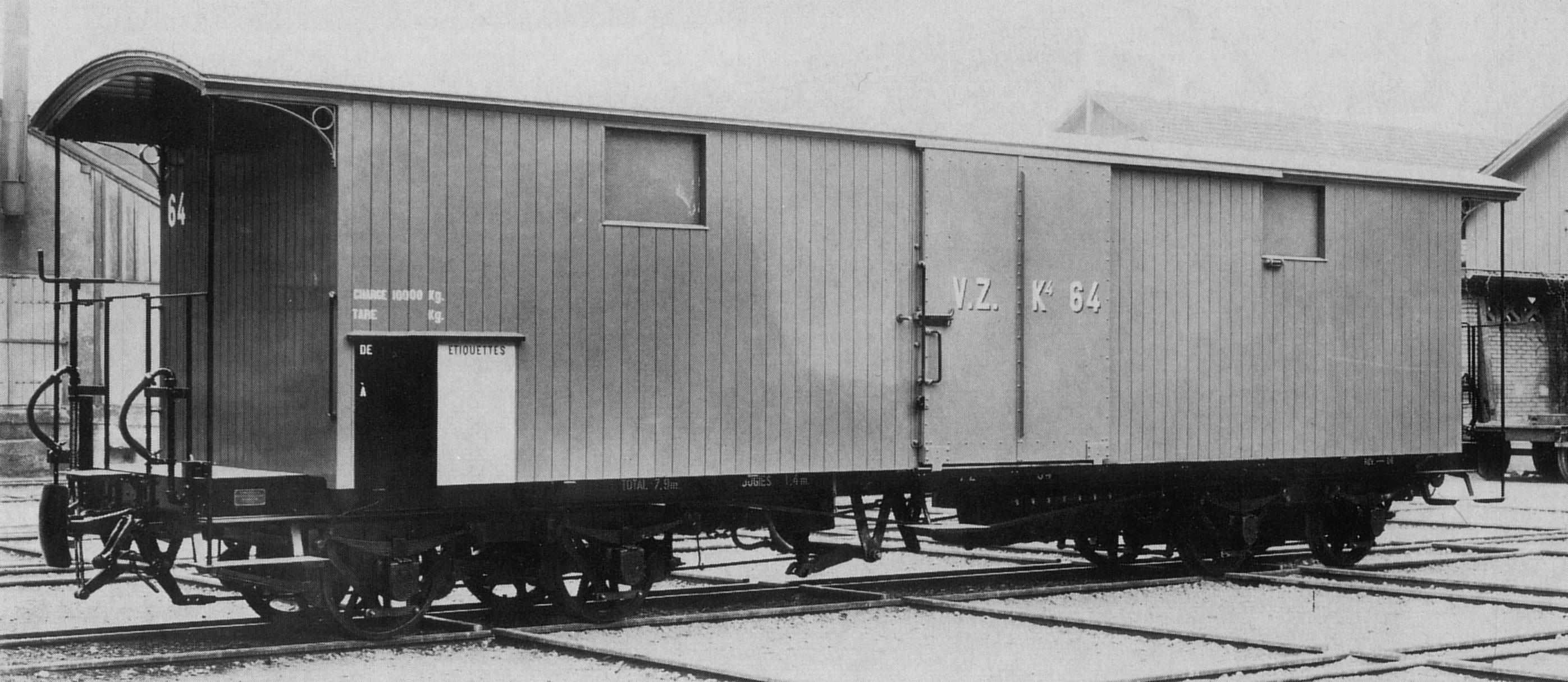
Goods van from 1906.

Unusually for a narrow gauge railway, the BVZ still has very intensive goods traffic. However, this is exclusively for the supply of Zermatt, which, now as before, can be served by trucks only to a limited extent.

As the remaining municipalities in the Mattertal can be supplied by trucks using the valley road, rail transport of goods generally plays no role for them. The only exception is the transport of so-called Embder Steinplatten, which are used in the region as traditional material for roofing. These stone slabs are moved by goods cable cars from the stone quarries at Embd to two loading tracks in the Kipfenschlucht, from where they are transported further by train to Visp.

The most important goods transported to Zermatt are foodstuffs, building materials and heating oil. Some other consumer goods are similarly transported by rail, and also tourist baggage. Transhipment facilities are provided at Visp station, where containers from trucks and standard gauge goods wagons are loaded onto narrow gauge wagons. To the east of Visp, there are facilities for filling tank wagons. At Zermatt, the station has been equipped since 1983 with partially underground facilities for transshipment of oil products.

The majority of the goods volume to Zermatt is transported in standard containers, for which bogie and four wheel carrying wagons are available. Freight not transported in containers is loaded at Visp into sliding wall box cars, and later delivered to recipients in Zermatt by electric road vehicles. For non moisture sensitive goods, many open wagons of various types can be used. Oil transport is undertaken in tank cars with either four wheels or bogies. Classic covered wagons play no role in normal traffic any more. During the high season, up to three purely goods trains operate daily in each direction, and goods wagons are also attached to some passenger trains.

Some of the goods wagons are suitable for use on the Gornergratbahn. By means of special railcars of type Bhe 4/4, goods can also be transported all the way to the Gornergrat without being transhipped at Zermatt.

== Rolling stock ==
=== Locomotives and railcars ===
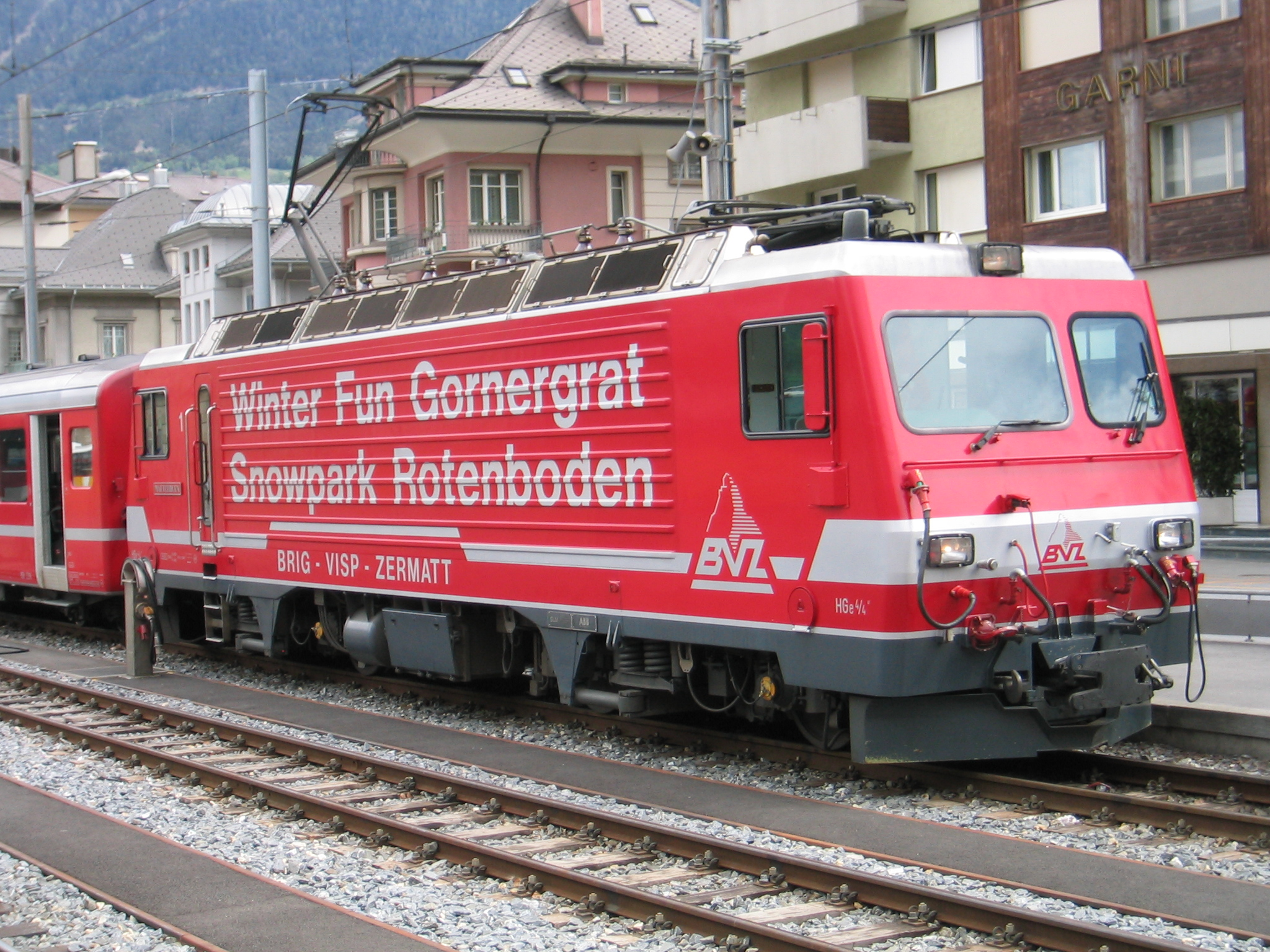
HGe 4/4 II No. 1

The VZ was initially operated by four steam locomotives of type HG 2/3, which entered traffic in 1890. Between 1893 and 1908, four more locomotives were added to the fleet. With the electrification of the line in 1929, the five oldest steam locos could be withdrawn from service, while the other three were initially retained as reserves. After 1941, only Loco No 7 remained on the books, as a reserve that could be operated independently of the electric wires. Today, this loco serves as a museum locomotive.

In 1929 and 1930, a total of five eight-wheeled electric locomotives HGe 4/4 I were procured for electric operations. In 1939, a sixth locomotive was added, with a new bodywork design. These six vehicles were supplemented in 1960 and 1965 by a total of five two-car railcars of types ABDeh 6/6 and ABDeh 8/8. In 1975 and 1976, four heavy baggage railcars of type Deh 4/4 arrived in the Mattertal.

The commissioning in 1990 of five modern electric locomotives of type HGe 4/4 II allowed the gradual phasing out of the aged HGe 4/4 I locomotives. Only locos no 15 and 16 remain as museum vehicles and reserves. Further modernisation has taken place since 2003, with the purchase of low floored articulated railcars manufactured by Stadler. From the time of their delivery in either 2003 or 2005, the first four BDSeh 4/8 railcars operated shuttle trains between Täsch and Zermatt. Five further examples of the ABDeh 4/8 and ABDeh 4/10 classes were to have entered traffic by 2008.

=== Passenger cars ===
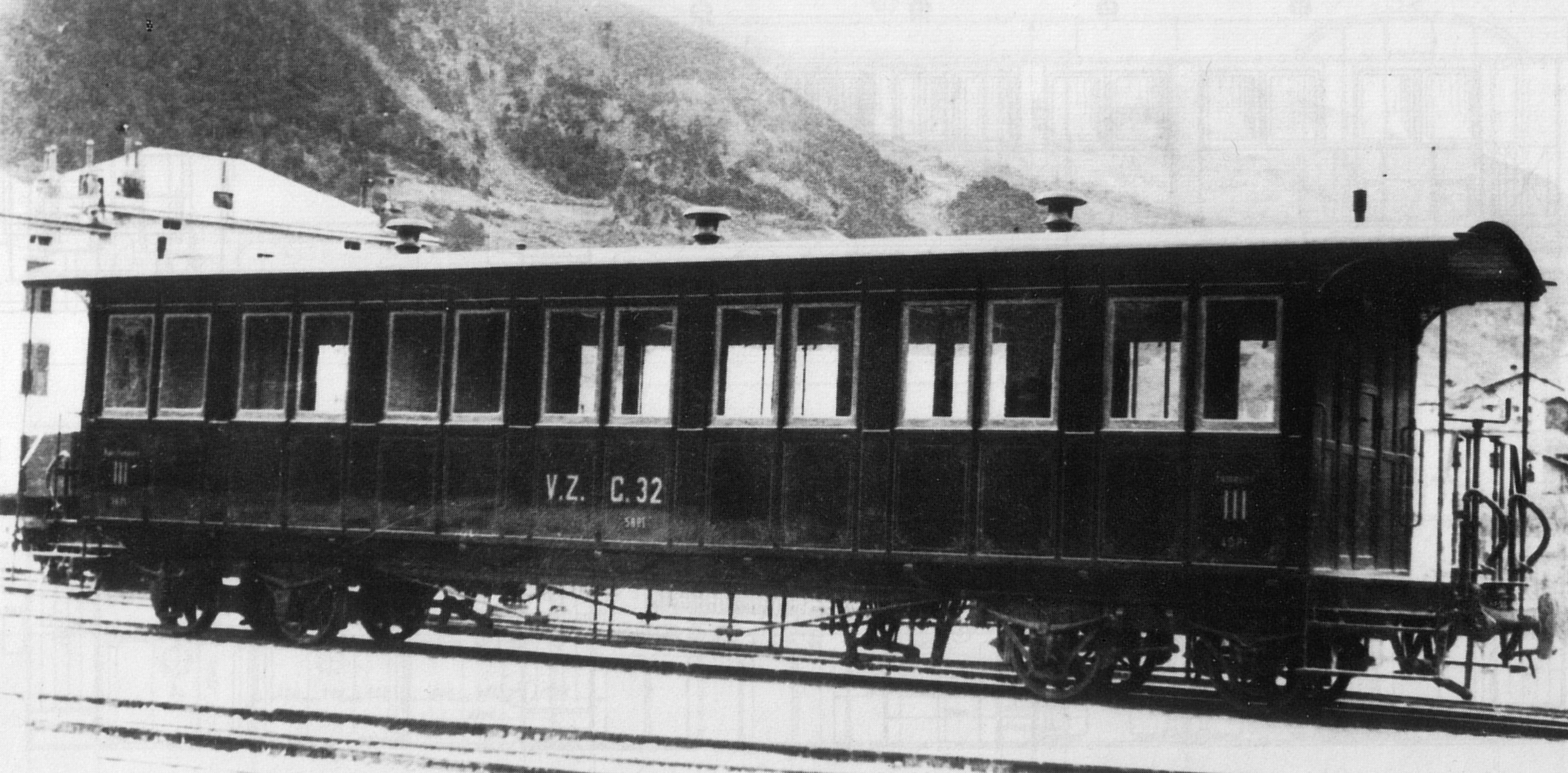
Passenger car C^{4} No. 32 from 1890

Right from the beginning, the Visp-Zermatt-Bahn procured only eight wheeled bogie passenger cars of all three classes, manufactured by the Schweizerische Industrie-Gesellschaft (SIG). Modernisation began even before World War I, with the construction of new car bodies. In 1931, the VZ purchased its first two-passenger cars with enclosed platforms, for use in the Glacier Express.

After World War II, a comprehensive modernisation process began. A total of 26 centre entrance cars of light alloy construction were placed into service between 1955 and 1963. They represented a shortened variant of a type originally used on the Brünigbahn. In 1990, they were supplemented with some of the original length type, purchased second hand from the Brünigbahn.

Between 1968 and 1975, a further increase in capacity resulted from the purchase of so-called Einheitswagen. Once again, the BVZ chose a car type previously used by the Brünigbahn. By combining these cars with the four baggage railcars acquired between 1975 and 1976, and their matching driving cars, the BVZ could offer shuttle trains for the first time.

The latest innovation is the panorama cars acquired in 1993 in conjunction with the Furka-Oberalp-Bahn, and used mainly in the Glacier-Express. After the merger of the two companies into the Matterhorn-Gotthard-Bahn, the concept was further developed. For the 2006 season, in co-operation with the Rhätische Bahn, a total of 24 additional panorama cars of a new design were purchased.

=== Liveries ===
The steam locomotives were originally painted black. Since the end of the 1980s, the museum locomotive HG 2/3 No. 7 has carried a green-black colour scheme. Passenger cars, electric locomotives and railcars were painted at first in one colour, a dark tone of red that gradually lightened over time. From 1982 onwards there was, additionally, a small silver stripe running the length of these vehicles below the window line.

In the Jubilee year 1991, the company bestowed upon itself a new logo that was gradually affixed, to the coaches within about five years, but to the HGe 4/4" only in 1999/2000. After the transition to the Matterhorn Gotthard Bahn, the side walls of the passenger cars and passenger railcars were covered with white. The locomotives and baggage railcars have since been painted a uniform red colour. During repaints of vehicles, the same colour scheme has been used, apart from the slightly lighter MGB red.

There is no uniform colour scheme for the goods wagons. Wooden parts of vehicles are usually painted dark brown, while components made of stainless light alloys usually remain unpainted. Tank wagons receive a dark green paint job on the tanks. The smooth sidewalls of modern boxcars are often used for advertising slogans.

=== List of locomotives ===
Steam and electric locomotives, railcars
No.	Name	Type	Manufacturer	Build year	Withdrawal	Notes
1	Matterhorn	HG 2/3	SLM	1890	1929	
2	Monte Rosa	HG 2/3	SLM	1890	1929	Equipped with superheater in 1913
3	Mischabel	HG 2/3	SLM	1890	1929	Equipped with superheater in 1926
4	Gornergrat	HG 2/3	SLM	1890	1929	
5	St. Theodule	HG 2/3	SLM	1893	1929	Equipped with superheater in 1916
6	Weisshorn	HG 2/3	SLM	1902	1941	Equipped with superheater in 1925, sold to Ems-Chemie Chur in 1941, 1988 to DFB
7	Breithorn	HG 2/3	SLM	1906		Equipped with superheater in 1921, rebuilt with new boiler in 2001, museum vehicle, working condition
8	Lyskamm	HG 2/3	SLM	1908	1935	Equipped with superheater in 1915
11	-	HGe 4/4 I	SLM, MFO, SWS	1929	2005	
12	-	HGe 4/4 I	SLM, MFO, SWS	1929	2004	
13	-	HGe 4/4 I	SLM, MFO, SWS	1929	2002	
14	-	HGe 4/4 I	SLM, MFO, SWS	1929	1992	
15	-	HGe 4/4 I	SLM, MFO, SWS	1930		Museum vehicle, working condition
16	-	HGe 4/4 I	SLM, MFO	1939		Prototype for HGe 4/4 I of the FO, 1951/52 rebuilt after accident, 2007 to DFB
2031	-	ABDeh 6/6	SIG, SLM, SAAS	1960	2006	
2032	-	ABDeh 6/6	SIG, SLM, SAAS	1960	2005	
2041	Brig	ABDeh 8/8	SIG, SLM, SAAS	1965		
2042	Visp	ABDeh 8/8	SIG, SLM, SAAS	1965		
2043	Zermatt	ABDeh 8/8	SIG, SLM, SAAS	1965	2008	
21	Stalden	Deh 4/4	SIG, SLM, SAAS	1975		
22	St. Niklaus	Deh 4/4	SIG, SLM, SAAS	1975		
23	Randa	Deh 4/4	SIG, SLM, SAAS	1976		
24	Täsch	Deh 4/4	SIG, SLM, SAAS	1976		
1^{II}	Matterhorn	HGe 4/4 II	SLM, ABB	1990		
2^{II}	Monte Rosa	HGe 4/4 II	SLM, ABB	1990		
3^{II}	Dom	HGe 4/4 II	SLM, ABB	1990		
4^{II}	Täschhorn	HGe 4/4 II	SLM, ABB	1990		
5^{II}	Mount Fuji	HGe 4/4 II	SLM, ABB	1990		Former name Dent Blanche
2051	Castor	BDSeh 4/8	Stadler	2003		
2052	Pollux	BDSeh 4/8	Stadler	2003		
2053	Albatross	BDSeh 4/8	Stadler	2005		Procured by MGB
2054	Eagle	BDSeh 4/8	Stadler	2005		Procured by MGB

Shunting and diesel locos, railway service vehicles
No.	Name	Type	Manufacturer	Build year	Withdrawal	Notes
2961	-	Xmh 1/2	Asper	1928	1981	Motor trolley, rebuilt by BVZ in 1957 and 1974
2921	-	Tm 2/2	RACO	1957	1993	Produced as No. 301, renumbered 1959 as 2921, withdrawn after accident
2922	-	Tm 2/2	RACO	1959		Equipped with hydraulic crane since 1981
71	-	Gm 3/3	Moyse	1975		
72	-	Gm 3/3	Moyse	1975		
73	-	Tm 2/2	Schöma, Deutz	1980		Built 1972, acquired by BVZ 1980, used previously on the construction of the Arlberg Road Tunnel
2962	-	Xmh 1/2	Steck/Deutz	1982		
74	-	Tm 2/2	Ruhrthaler	1991		Built 1958, ex Kerkerbachbahn, acquired by BVZ 1991
75	Niklaus	HGm 2/2	Stadler	2002		Capable of running on the Gornergratbahn

== Future ==
Pending approval, construction of the Mattertal Tunnel will start in 2028 and complete in 2035. It bypasses the section of the line between Täsch and Zermatt, protecting it from winter weather. It will also reduce travel times by avoiding the need to use a rack during this section.

== See also ==
- History of rail transport in Switzerland
- Rail transport in Switzerland
- Rhaetian Railway
