= Matterhorn Gotthard Bahn BDSeh 4/8 =

Swiss mixed rack and adhesion trainset

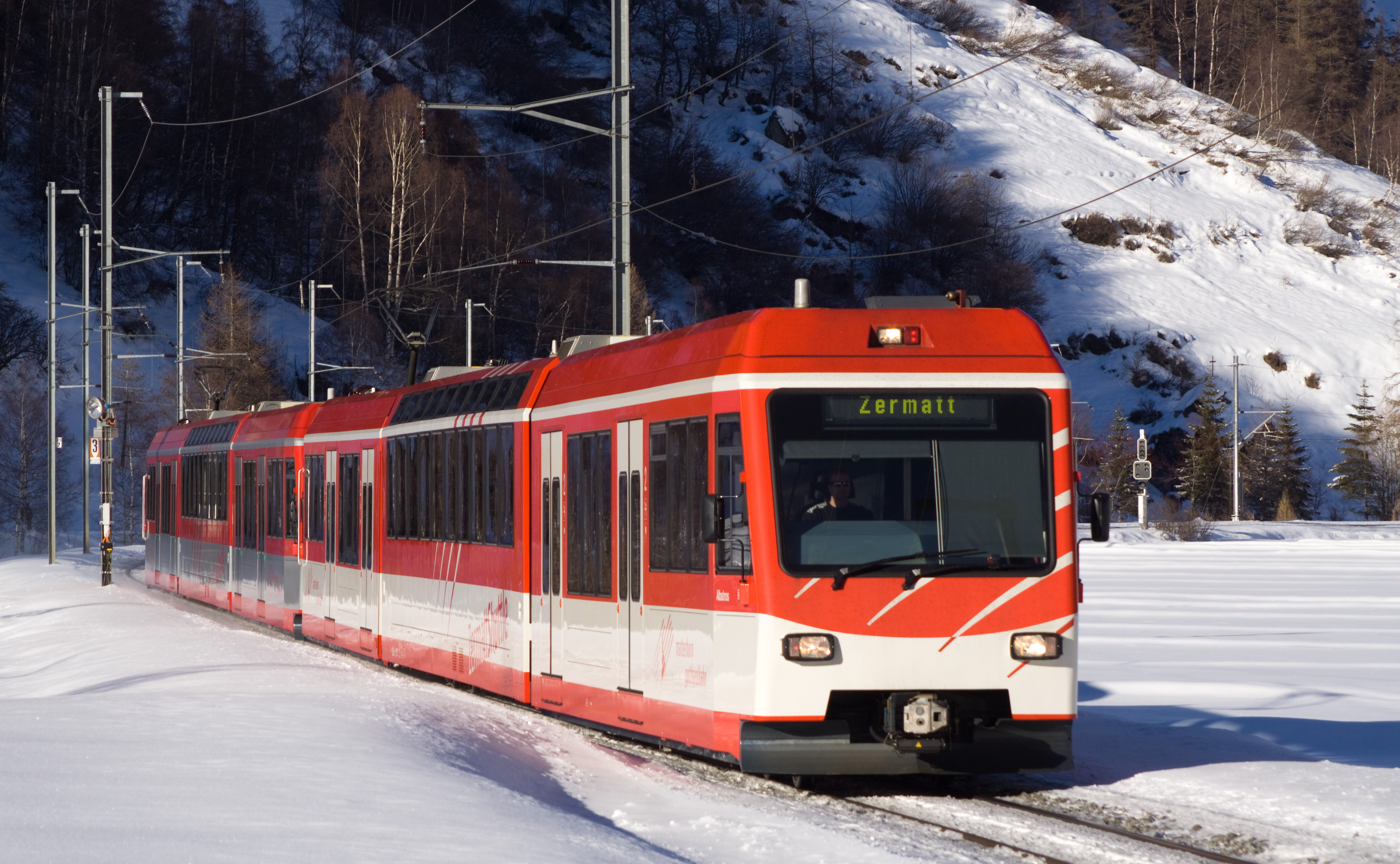
- A BDSeh 4/8 on 2 January 2009.
- Manufacturer: Stadler Rail
- Constructed: 2003–2006
- Number built: 4
- Number in service: 4
- Fleet numbers: 2051–2054
- Operators: Matterhorn Gotthard Bahn

Specifications
- Train length: 52,014 mm (170 ft 8 in)
- Maximum speed: Adhesion: 80 km/h (50 mph); Rack rail: 35 km/h (22 mph)
- Weight: 69 tonnes (152,100 lb)
- Power output: 1,000 kW (1,340 hp)
- Electric system(s): 11 kV 16.7 Hz
- Current collector(s): Overhead
- UIC classification: 2′Bo′zz Bo′zz 2′
- Track gauge: 1,000 mm (3 ft 3 3/8 in)

The Matterhorn Gotthard Bahn BDSeh 4/8 is a four member class of metre gauge electric multiple units operated by the Matterhorn Gotthard Bahn (MGB), in the Canton of Valais, Switzerland. They have partially panoramic, articulated bodies, and were the first new items of powered rolling stock to be placed into service by the MGB.

Since entering the MGB fleet, the BDSeh 4/8 multiple units have been used to operate the Zermatt shuttle trains. These trains link Zermatt railway station, which serves the car-free mountaineering and ski resort of Zermatt, with Täsch railway station, where there is a large parking station for people travelling to or from Zermatt by road vehicle.

== Technical details ==
The BDSeh 4/8 class is part of the Stadler GTW family of multiple units. It has an aluminium frame.

Each member of the class is made up of three articulated units. The central unit is a panorama car, and houses the four traction motors. Attached to each end of the central unit is a control car unit. The two outlying units have low floor entrances, to facilitate the transport of baggage carts, 40 of which can be loaded into the whole three unit train.

The BDSeh 4/8 class vehicles are all equipped with Schwab type automatic couplings. These couplings can be used to join two members of the class, and thereby make up a six unit train, thus adjusting capacity to meet changes in demand.

The interiors of the vehicles are fitted with air conditioning and information display screens.
