= Alphubel =

Mountain in the Pennine Alps

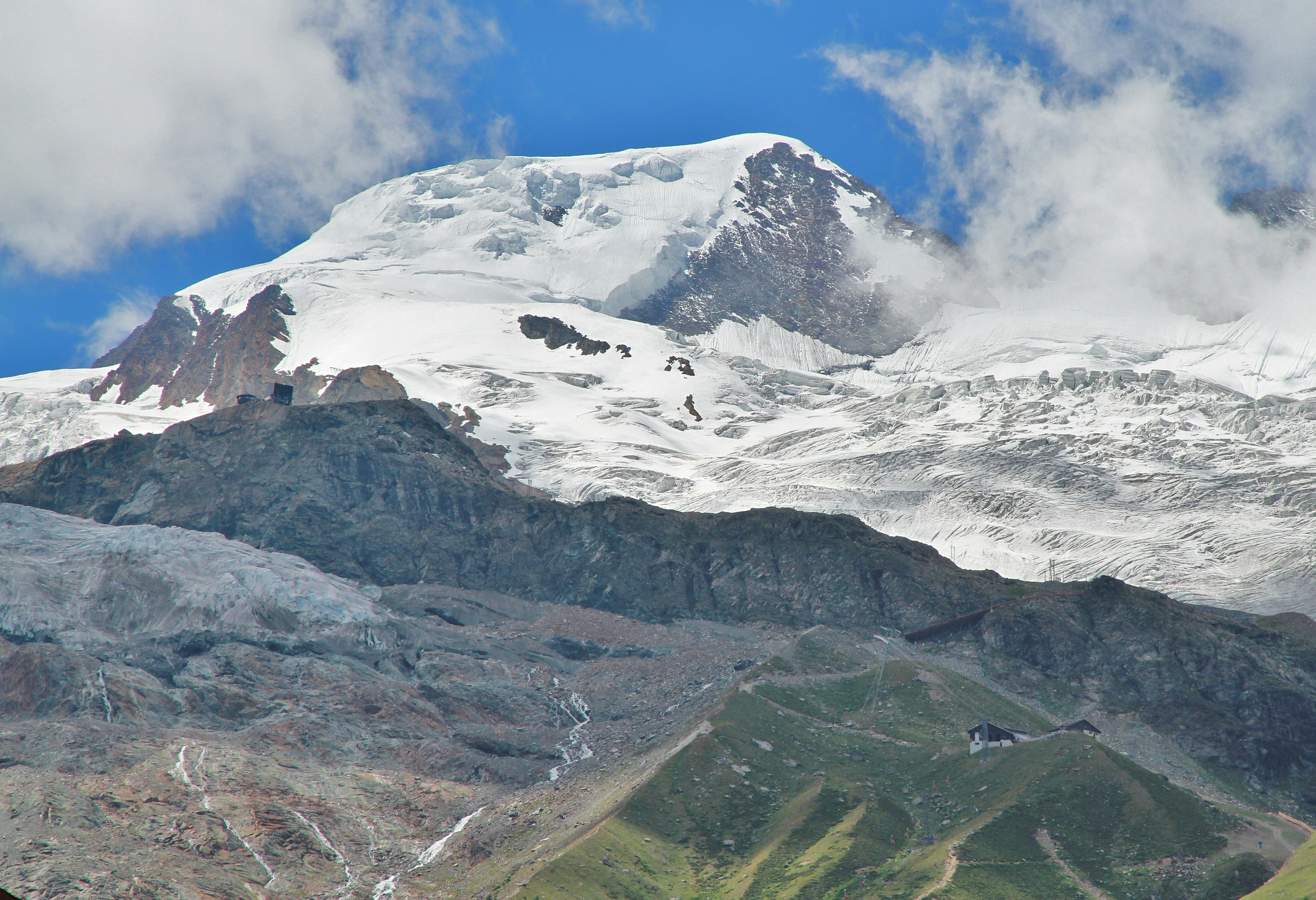
- The Alphubel seen from Saas-Fee (north-east side)

Highest point
- Elevation: 4,206 m (13,799 ft)
- Prominence: 359 m (1,178 ft)
- Parent peak: Dom
- Isolation: 1.9 km (1.2 mi)
- Coordinates: 46°3′46.58″N 7°51′50.08″E

Geography
- Location within Switzerland
- Location: Valais, Switzerland
- Parent range: Pennine Alps

Climbing
- First ascent: 9 August 1860 by Leslie Stephen and T. W. Hinchliff with guides Melchior Anderegg and Peter Perren
- Easiest route: Many routes at PD

The Alphubel (4,206 m, 13,799 ft) is a mountain of the Swiss Pennine Alps, located between the valleys of Zermatt and Saas in the canton of Valais. It is part of the Allalin Group, a subgroup of the Mischabel Group, which culminates at the Dom (4,545 m, 14,911 ft). The summit of the Alphubel consists of a large ice-covered plateau, part of the Fee Glacier on its east side. The west side of the mountain is more rocky and much steeper. It overlooks the Weingartensee.

The nearest settlements are Täsch (north of Zermatt) and Saas-Fee.

== Geography ==
North of the Alphubel is the higher Täschhorn, the southernmost top of the Mischabel, from which it is separated by the saddle of Mischabeljoch (3,847 m, 12,621 ft), while the ridge to the south is less prominent running via the Alphubeljoch (3,771 m, 12,372 ft) to the Feechopf (3,888 m, 12,756 ft) and Allalinhorn. While the terrain drops steeply into the Mattertal valley to the west, the east side is flat and, compared to its neighbours, almost smooth. The characteristically flat summit of the Alphubel is mostly covered with firn and has, in addition to the main summit, a northern top of 4,188 m (13,740 ft), which barely rises above the flat summit area.

From the Alphubel a prominent, ice-free, rocky arête, the Rotgrat, strikes westwards down to the Täsch Hut (Täschhütte, 2,701 m, 8,862 ft), while the main, north-south, ridge and an unnamed arête running northeast are largely covered by ice. Due to its considerable height and relatively low gradient of its slopes, there are several glaciers in the summit area of the Alphubel: To the northwest and west of the summit is the Weingarten Glacier, which has now disintegrated into three ice masses, reaching down to about 3,100 m (10,200 ft) in front of which is Lake Weingarten (Weingartensee). The entire eastern flank is taken up by the Fee Glacier, one of the larger glaciers of the region, which extends over several square kilometres and still almost reaches the valley basin near Saas-Fee. The Alphubel Glacier, the smallest glacier on the summit, lies in the south-west.

== Climbing history ==
The first ascent of the mountain was by Leslie Stephen and T. W. Hinchliff with guides Melchior Anderegg and Peter Perren on 9 August 1860, starting at Täsch and via the south-east ridge and the Alphubeljoch.

In 1863 Emma Winkworth, the daughter of Thomas Thomasson, became the first woman to climb the Alphubel.

== Routes ==
The morphology of the Alphubel and its proximity to the Saas-Fee funicular make the Alphubel one of the comparatively easier four-thousanders of the Swiss Alps to climb. Nevertheless, all the ascents have the character of a high mountain tour with all the typical dangers of such a tour.

The normal route leads from Berghaus Längflue (2,867 m, 9,406 ft) above Saas-Fee over the flat but crevassed Fee Glacier to the summit. The ascent takes 4–5 hours and is rated PD or WS ("wenig schwierig / a little difficult") on the Swiss Alpine Club's high tour scale.

Another option with Saas-Fee as the base is a high-level tour from Mittelallalin (3,457 m, 11,342 ft), which can be easily reached via the Metro Alpin funicular. From there, the ascent, partly over rock, leads via the Feejoch (3,826 m, 12,552 ft), Feechopf and Alphubeljoch to the summit (also WS, 4 hrs).

From the west, the best known route leads from Täsch via Täschalp and the Täschhütte and from there over the Alphubel Glacier via the Alphubeljoch over the main south-south-east running ridge (Eisnase) to the summit. This route takes about 5 hours and is also rated WS.

== Huts ==
- Täsch Hut
- Britannia Hut, via Mittelallalin
- Kin Hut (Kinhütte)
- Mischabeljochbiwak, a refuge hut on the eponymous saddle between the Alphubel and Täschhorn

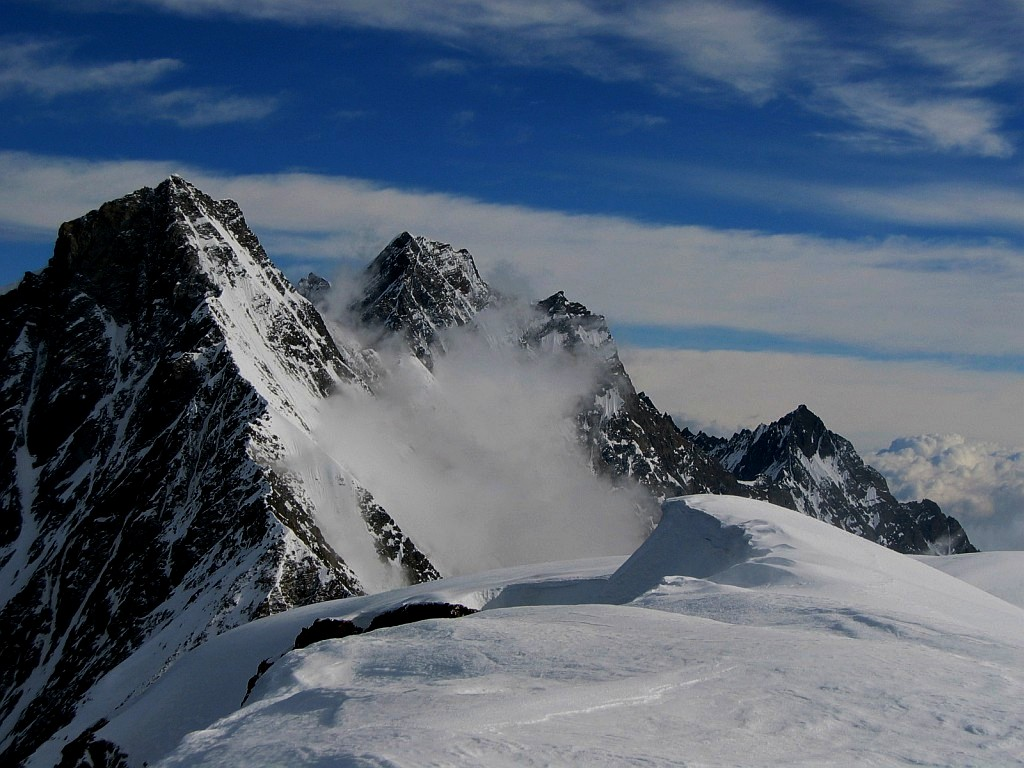
View of the Täschhorn and the Dom from the summit of the Alphubel

== See also ==
- List of 4000 metre peaks of the Alps
