= Britannia Hut =

Coordinates: 46°03′36″N 7°56′06″E

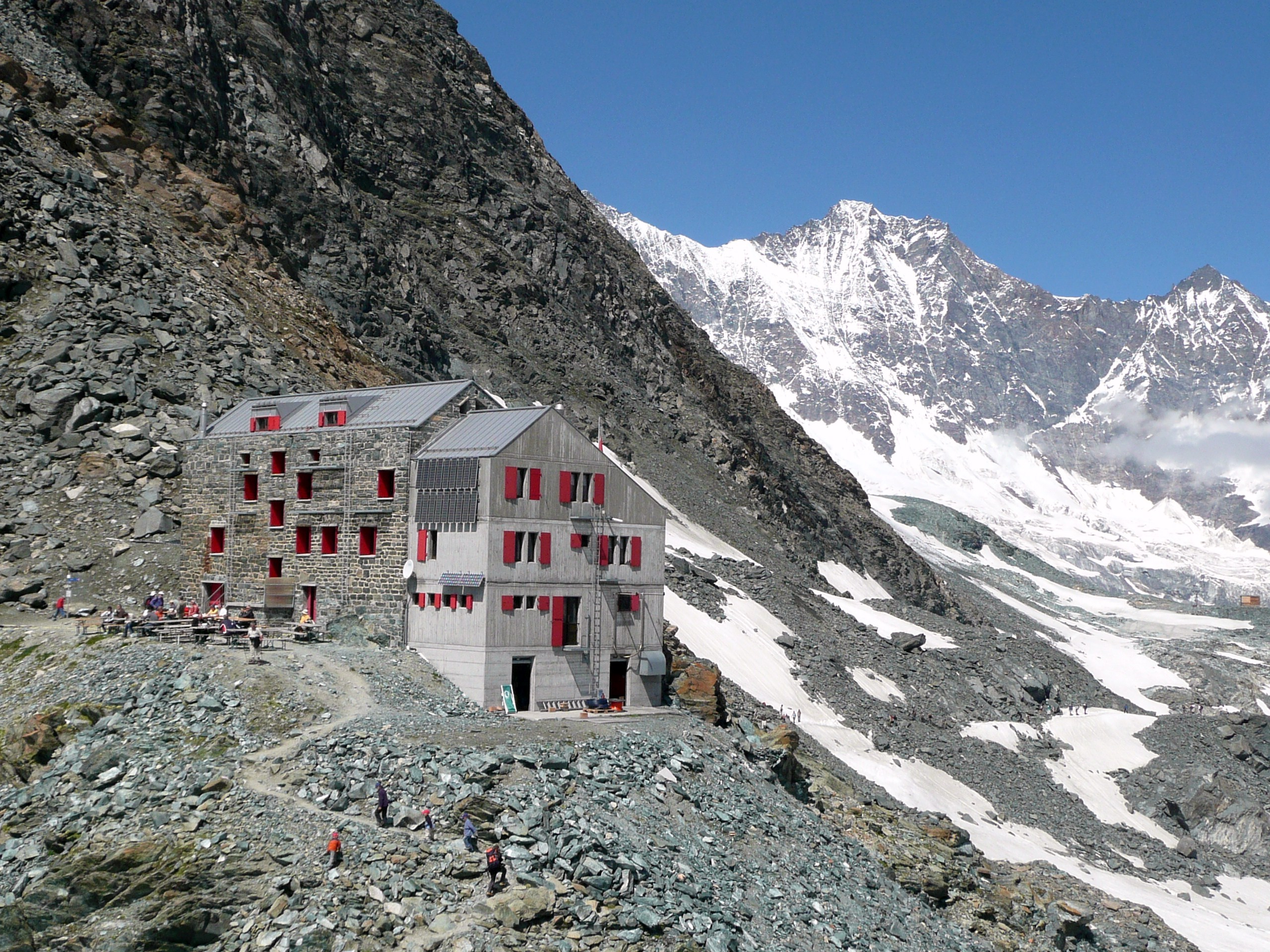
The Britannia Hut with the Dom in background

The Britannia Hut (German: Britanniahütte) is a mountain hut of the Swiss Alpine Club, located south of Saas-Almagell in the canton of Valais. It is situated 3,030 metres above sea level, at the foot of the Allalinhorn near the Allalin Glacier, in the Mischabel massif. It is a starting point for the ascents of Strahlhorn, Rimpfischhorn and Allalinhorn.

The hut is accessible from the Felskinn station via a trail on the Fee Glacier.

== History ==
The hut was officially opened on 17 August 1912 when the keys to the hut were handed over from the Vice President of the Association of British Members of the Swiss Alpine Club (ABMSAC) to the Swiss Alpine Club (SAC-CAS) at its inauguration. The building of the hut was funded by contributions from British members of climbing clubs and in particular the ABMSAC, which was founded by British members of the Alpine Club in 1909 with one its objectives to raise money for a hut. The hut was gifted to the Swiss Alpine Club (Geneva Section) in gratitude for the hospitality received by British climbers at the many other Swiss huts in the Alpine region.

The hut was completely renovated in 1997 and celebrated its centenary in 2012. The hut maintains strong links with British mountaineering clubs with the ABMSAC, Eagle Ski Club and Ski Club of Great Britain gifting 25,000 CHF for the installation of seven new solar panels to mark the centenary of the Britannia Hut.

== See also ==
- List of buildings and structures above 3000 m in Switzerland
