= Vispa =

River in the canton of Valais

Coordinates: 46°18′07″N 7°52′12″E

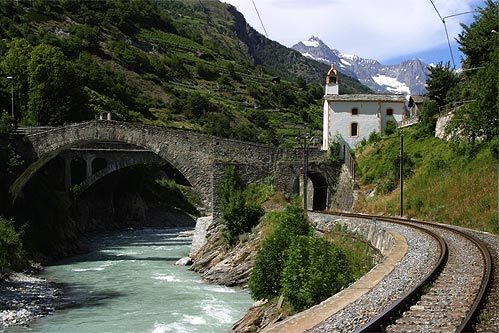
The Vispa near Stalden

The Vispa is a river in the canton of Valais, Switzerland, located in the Visp area. It is essentially composed of two large branches: the Matter Vispa and the Saaser Vispa, converging at Stalden, then forming the Vispa proper, flowing for less than 10 kilometres (6.2 mi) before converging with the Rhône at Visp. The Vispa is a left and major affluent of the Rhône, before it enters Lake Geneva.

The Vispa collects the waters from the Mattertal (formed by the Matter Vispa) and the Saastal (formed by the Saaser Vispa), the two highest valleys in Switzerland and the Pennine Alps. Both valleys have mountains over 4,500 metres (14,800 ft) above sea level, the highest being Monte Rosa, the Dom and the Weisshorn, and include numerous glaciers, large and small. As a result, the river is characterized by a glacial regime, similarly to the Massa, another nearby affluent of the Rhône.

The Matter Vispa is the longest of the two branches. It is over 30 kilometres (19 mi) long, from the mouth of the Gorner Glacier to Stalden. It comprehends small but numerous affluents, notably the Gornera, Zmuttbach, Triftbach and Findelbach, all around Zermatt, but also the Täschbach and Schalibach, near Täsch, and the Riedbach, near St. Niklaus. The Matter Vispa (and Vispa) is closely followed by the Matterhorn Gotthard Bahn, a railway connecting Zermatt to Visp.

The Saaser Vispa is second-longest affluent of the Vispa. It is about 30 kilometres (19 mi) long, from Monte Moro Pass to Stalden. It comprehends only a few short affluents, the largest being the Furggbach, converging near Saas-Almagell. The Saaser Vispa flows through the Mattmarksee, an artificial lake located near its source, and notably collect the waters from the Fee Glacier (through the Feeru Vispa), near Saas-Fee.

The Vispa proper, forming the Vispertal (German: Visp valley), constitutes the shortest section. It is about 10 kilometres (6.2 mi) long and flows from Stalden, at an elevation of about 720 metres (2,360 ft) to the Rhône at Visp and near Baltschieder, at an elevation of about 640 metres (2,100 ft).

== See also ==
- List of rivers of Switzerland
