= Metro Alpin =

Underground funicular at Saas-Fee, Switzerland

Coordinates: 46°3′28″N 7°54′18″E

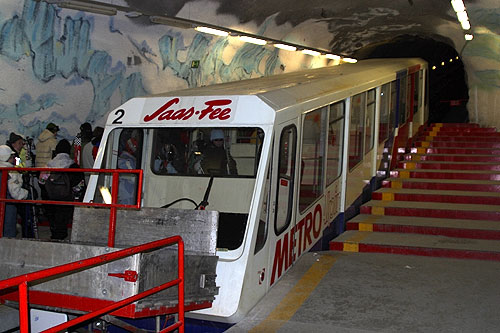
- lower station (2004)

Overview
- Status: In operation
- Owner: Saastal Bergbahnen AG (since 2016), Saas-Fee Bergbahnen AG (‥–2016, name change)
- Locale: Saas-Fee, Switzerland
- Termini: Felskinn; Mittelallalin
- Stations: 2
- Website: saas-fee.ch

Service
- Type: Funicular, Underground
- Operator(s): Saastal Bergbahnen AG
- Rolling stock: 2 for 115 passengers each

History
- Opened: 19 December 1984 (40 years ago)

Technical
- Line length: 1,749 metres (5,738 ft)
- Electrification: since opening
- Highest elevation: 3,456 m (11,339 ft)

The Metro Alpin is an underground funicular situated above the Swiss town of Saas Fee, in the canton of Valais. Opened in 1984, it links the Felskinn cable-car station (2,980 metres or 9,777 feet MSL) on the shore of the Fee Glacier to the Mittelallalin (3,456 metres or 11,339 feet) in the north flank of the Allalinhorn. The Felskinn–Mittelallalin Tunnel has a length of 1,749 metres (5,738 ft), with an altitude difference of 476 metres (1,562 ft) between the two stations.

The Metro Alpin is the highest funicular in the world. Being a fully underground railway, it is also considered the highest subway in the world.

== See also ==
- List of buildings and structures above 3000 m in Switzerland
- List of funicular railways
- List of funiculars in Switzerland
