= Schwarzberg =

Schwarzberg (from German: black mountain) is the name of several mountains and places:

- Schwarzberg (Lepontine Alps), a mountain in Switzerland
- Schwarzberg (Vogtland), a mountain in Germany
- Schwarzberg Glacier, a glacier in Switzerland

== See also ==
- Schwarzberghorn
