= Dent Blanche Hut =

Coordinates: 46°01′13″N 7°36′03″E

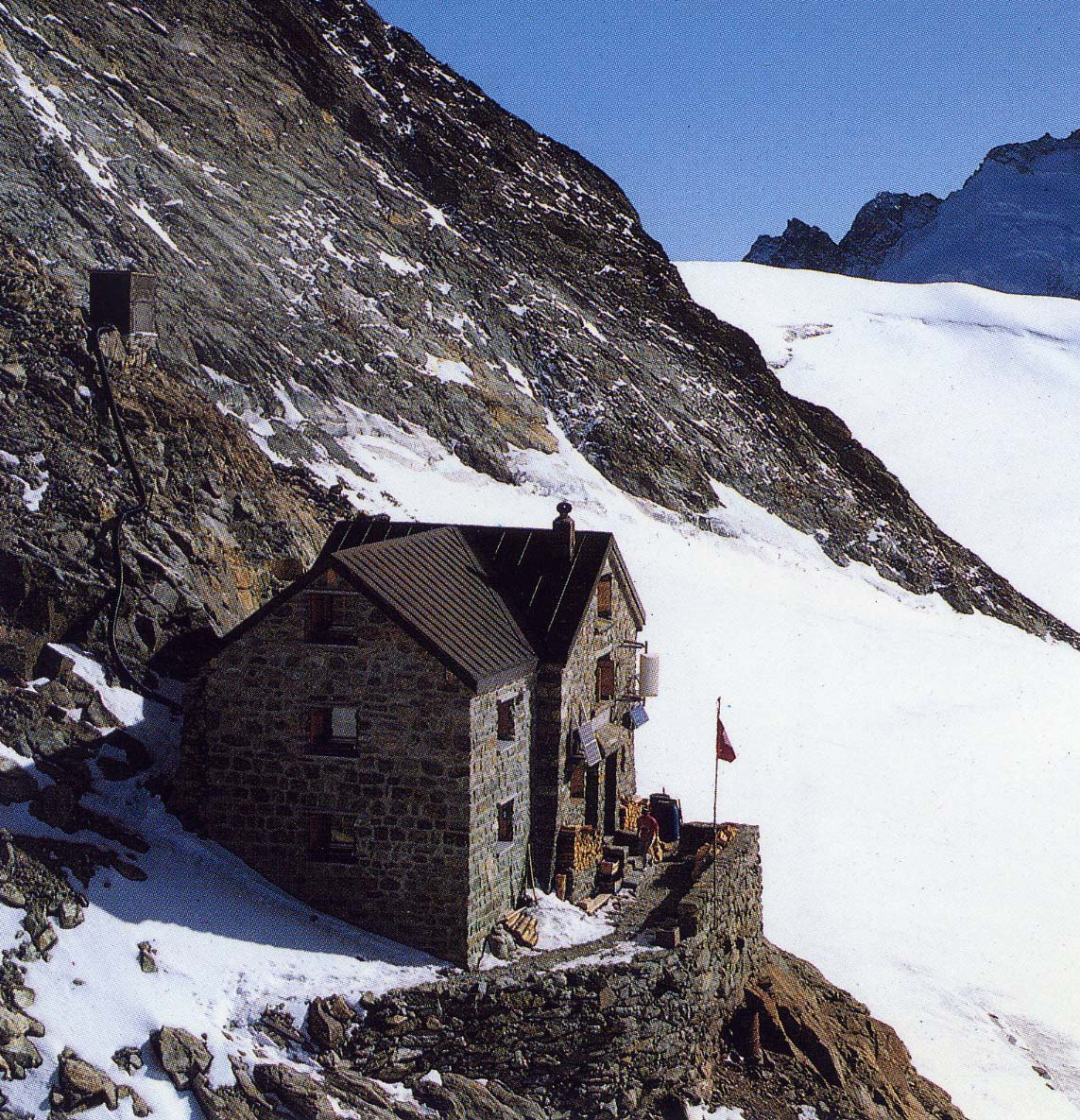
The Dent Blanche Hut with the Ferpècle Glacier in background

The Dent Blanche Hut (French: Cabane de la Dent Blanche or Cabane Rossier) is a mountain hut of the Swiss Alpine Club, located south of Les Haudères in the canton of Valais. The hut lies at a height of 3,507 metres above sea level, at the foot of the Dent Blanche in the Pennine Alps. The hut, located at the upper end of the valley of Hérens near the watershed with the valley of Zermatt, overlooks the Ferpècle Glacier.

All accesses to the hut involve glacier crossing, except from the Ferpècle valley where due to glacier recession its possible to walk over rock in peak summer.

== See also ==
- List of buildings and structures above 3000 m in Switzerland
