= List of buildings and structures in Switzerland above 3000 m =

This is a list of buildings and infrastructures above 3,000 metres (9,843 ft) in Switzerland. As this height approximately corresponds to the level of the climatic snow line in the Alps, infrastructures located above it are generally subject to harsh weather conditions and are more difficult to build. This list also includes structures located precisely on the Italian border (*) that could be partially in Switzerland.

== List ==
Building (or location)	Type	Elevation	Canton(s)	Municipality(ies)	Notes
Margherita Hut*	Mountain hut	4,554 m (14,941 ft)	Valais	Zermatt	Highest building in Europe, entirely in Italian territory
Solvay Hut	Mountain hut	4,003 m (13,133 ft)	Valais	Zermatt	Highest mountain hut of the Swiss Alpine Club
Bivacco Città di Gallarate*	Mountain hut	3,960 m (12,992 ft)	Valais	Zermatt	
Gobba di Rollin	Ski lift terminus	3,899 m (12,792 ft)	Valais	Zermatt	Highest ski lift in Europe
Klein Matterhorn	Observation deck	3,883 m (12,740 ft)	Valais	Zermatt	Highest observation deck in Europe
Mischabeljochbiwak	Mountain hut	3,847 m (12,621 ft)	Valais	Saas-Fee/Täsch	
Carrel Hut*	Mountain hut	3,829 m (12,562 ft)	Valais	Zermatt	
Klein Matterhorn	Cable car station, restaurant	3,820 m (12,533 ft)	Valais	Zermatt	Highest station and restaurant in Europe
Schalijochbiwak	Mountain hut	3,786 m (12,421 ft)	Valais	Anniviers/Randa	
Plateau Rosa	Ski lift terminus	3,740 m (12,270 ft)	Valais	Zermatt	
Bivacco Giorgio e Renzo Novella*	Mountain hut	3,706 m (12,159 ft)	Valais	Zermatt	
Jungfraujoch radio relay station	Radio relay	3,705 m (12,156 ft)	Bern/Valais	Lauterbrunnen/Fieschertal	
Bivouac Biaggio Musso	Mountain hut	3,658 m (12,001 ft)	Valais	Bourg-Saint-Pierre	
Mönchsjoch Hut	Mountain hut	3,657 m (11,998 ft)	Valais	Fieschertal	
Sphinx Observatory	Observatory, observation deck	3,572 m (11,719 ft)	Bern/Valais	Lauterbrunnen/Fieschertal	
Mittelallalin	Ski lift terminus	3,560 m (11,680 ft)	Valais	Saas-Fee	
Bivouac de la Dent Blanche	Mountain hut	3,540 m (11,614 ft)	Valais	Anniviers/Evolène	
Dent Blanche Hut	Mountain hut	3,507 m (11,506 ft)	Valais	Evolène	
Furggen*	Cable car station	3,492 m (11,457 ft)	Valais	Zermatt	Abandoned building
Testa Grigia*	Cable car station, mountain hut	3,479 m (11,414 ft)	Valais	Zermatt	
Mittelallalin	Funicular station, restaurant	3,457 m (11,342 ft)	Valais	Saas-Almagell/Saas-Fee	Highest funicular in the world
Jungfraujoch, Top of Europe	Railway station, restaurants, research center	3,454 m (11,332 ft)	Valais	Fieschertal	Highest railway station and post office in Europe
Stockhorn	Ski lift terminus	3,405 m (11,171 ft)	Valais	Zermatt	
Furggsattel	Chairlift station	3,360 m (11,024 ft)	Valais	Zermatt	
Mittellegi Hut	Mountain hut	3,355 m (11,007 ft)	Bern	Grindelwald	
Mischabel Hut	Mountain hut	3,335 m (10,942 ft)	Valais	Saas-Fee	
Theodul Hut*	Mountain hut	3,317 m (10,883 ft)	Valais	Zermatt	
Bertol Hut	Mountain hut	3,311 m (10,863 ft)	Valais	Evolène	
Mont Fort	Cable car station, bar	3,308 m (10,853 ft)	Valais	Bagnes/Nendaz	
Piz Corvatsch	Cable car station, restaurant	3,303 m (10,837 ft)	Graubünden	Samedan/Silvaplana	Highest building in Eastern Switzerland
Bergli Hut	Mountain hut	3,299 m (10,823 ft)	Bern	Grindelwald	
Refuge des Pantalons Blancs	Mountain hut	3,278 m (10,755 ft)	Valais	Hérémence	
Hohtälli	Cable car station	3,275 m (10,745 ft)	Valais	Zermatt	
Hörnli Hut	Mountain hut	3,260 m (10,696 ft)	Valais	Zermatt	
Oberaarjoch Hut	Mountain hut	3,256 m (10,682 ft)	Valais	Fieschertal	
Tracuit Hut	Mountain hut	3,256 m (10,682 ft)	Valais	Anniviers/Oberems	
Rote Nase	Cable car station	3,251 m (10,666 ft)	Valais	Zermatt	
Hollandia Hut	Mountain hut	3,240 m (10,630 ft)	Valais	Blatten	
Arbenbiwak	Mountain hut	3,224 m (10,577 ft)	Valais	Zermatt	
Rothorn Hut	Mountain hut	3,198 m (10,492 ft)	Valais	Zermatt	
Scopi	Cable car station, radar	3,190 m (10,466 ft)	Graubünden/Ticino	Medel/Blenio	
Bivacco Colombo*	Mountain hut	3,186 m (10,453 ft)	Graubünden	Sils im Engadin	
Bivouac de l'Aiguillette à la Singla	Mountain hut	3,176 m (10,420 ft)	Valais	Bagnes	
Georgy Hut	Mountain hut	3,175 m (10,417 ft)	Graubünden	La Punt Chamues-ch/Pontresina	
Trient Hut	Mountain hut	3,170 m (10,400 ft)	Valais	Trient	
Bivacco Tita Ronconi*	Mountain hut	3,168 m (10,394 ft)	Graubünden	Bregaglia	
Eismeer	Railway station	3,160 m (10,367 ft)	Bern	Grindelwald	
Vignettes Hut	Mountain hut	3,160 m (10,367 ft)	Valais	Evolène	
Hohsaas	Gondola station, restaurant	3,140 m (10,302 ft)	Valais	Saas-Grund	
Gornergrat Kulm Hotel	Hotel, observatory	3,120 m (10,236 ft)	Valais	Zermatt	
Hohstock	Ski lift terminus, tunnel	3,118 m (10,230 ft)	Valais	Naters	
Unterrothorn	Cable car station, restaurant	3,104 m (10,184 ft)	Valais	Zermatt	
Hohsaas Hut	Mountain hut	3,101 m (10,174 ft)	Valais	Saas-Grund	
Gornergrat	Railway station	3,090 m (10,138 ft)	Valais	Zermatt	Highest open-air railway station in Europe
Hockenhorngrat	Gondola station	3,086 m (10,125 ft)	Valais	Wiler	
Klein Titlis	Cable car station, restaurant, antenna	3,062 m (10,046 ft)	Obwalden	Engelberg	Highest building in Central Switzerland
Weingartensee	Dam	3,058 m (10,033 ft)	Valais	Täsch	
Finsteraarhorn Hut	Mountain hut	3,048 m (10,000 ft)	Valais	Fieschertal	
Fletschhorn Hut	Mountain hut	3,040 m (9,974 ft)	Valais	Eisten/Visperterminen	
Britannia Hut	Mountain hut	3,030 m (9,941 ft)	Valais	Saas-Almagell	
Valsorey Hut	Mountain hut	3,030 m (9,941 ft)	Valais	Bourg-Saint-Pierre	
Gandegg Hut	Mountain hut	3,029 m (9,938 ft)	Valais	Zermatt	
Piz Nair	Cable car station, restaurant	3,022 m (9,915 ft)	Graubünden	St. Moritz	
Egginerjoch	Ski lift terminus	3,021 m (9,911 ft)	Valais	Saas-Almagell/Saas-Fee	
Fletschhornbiwak	Mountain hut	3,014 m (9,888 ft)	Valais	Simplon	
Mittelaletschbiwak	Mountain hut	3,013 m (9,885 ft)	Valais	Betten	
Sass Queder	Chairlift station	3,004 m (9,856 ft)	Graubünden	Pontresina	
Mont Gelé	Cable car station	3,002 m (9,849 ft)	Valais	Bagnes	

== See also ==
- List of highest railway stations in Switzerland
- List of mountains of Switzerland above 3000 m
- List of mountain huts in the Alps
