= Schwarzberghorn =

Mountain in Switzerland

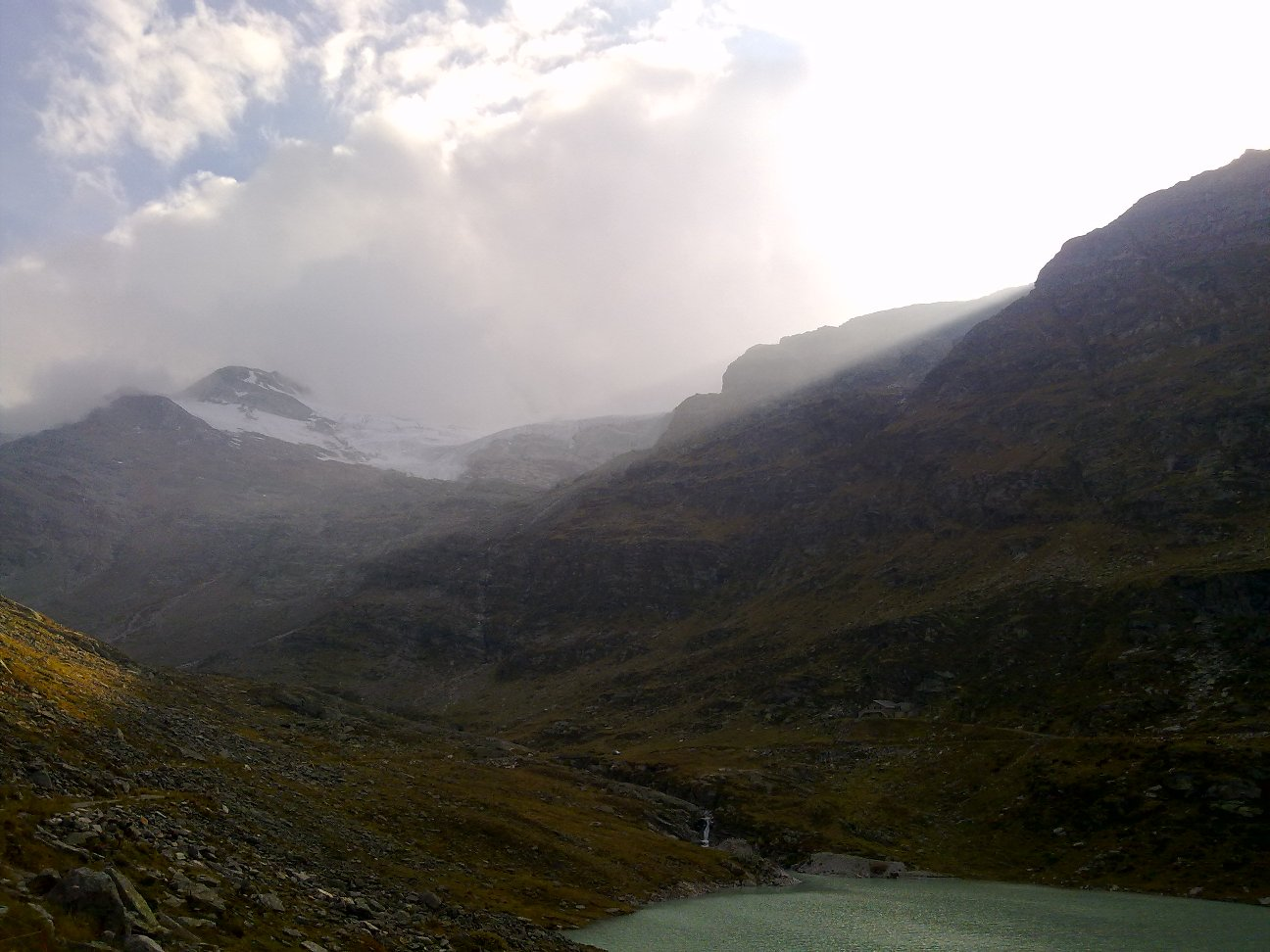
- View of Lake Mattmark and the chain between Monte Moro and Schwarzberghorn from Distelalp in the Saas valley (Valais).

Highest point
- Elevation: 3,609 m (11,841 ft)
- Prominence: 54 m (177 ft)
- Parent peak: Unnamed summit (3,641 m)
- Coordinates: 45°59′49.3″N 7°54′31.7″E

Naming
- Native name: Schwarzberghorn (German); Corno Nero (Italian)

Geography
- Location within Alps
- Countries: Switzerland and Italy
- Canton/Region: Valais and Piedmont
- Parent range: Pennine Alps

The Schwarzberghorn (Italian: Corno Nero) is a mountain of the Pennine Alps, located on the border between Switzerland and Italy. Its summit (3,609 m) is the tripoint between the valleys Mattertal, Saastal (both in Valais) and Valle Anzasca (in Piedmont) and the southernmost point of the Mischabel-Strahlhorn chain, and the northern end of the Weissgrat.
