= Allalin Glacier =

Glacier in Switzerland

Coordinates: 46°2′40″N 7°55′38″E

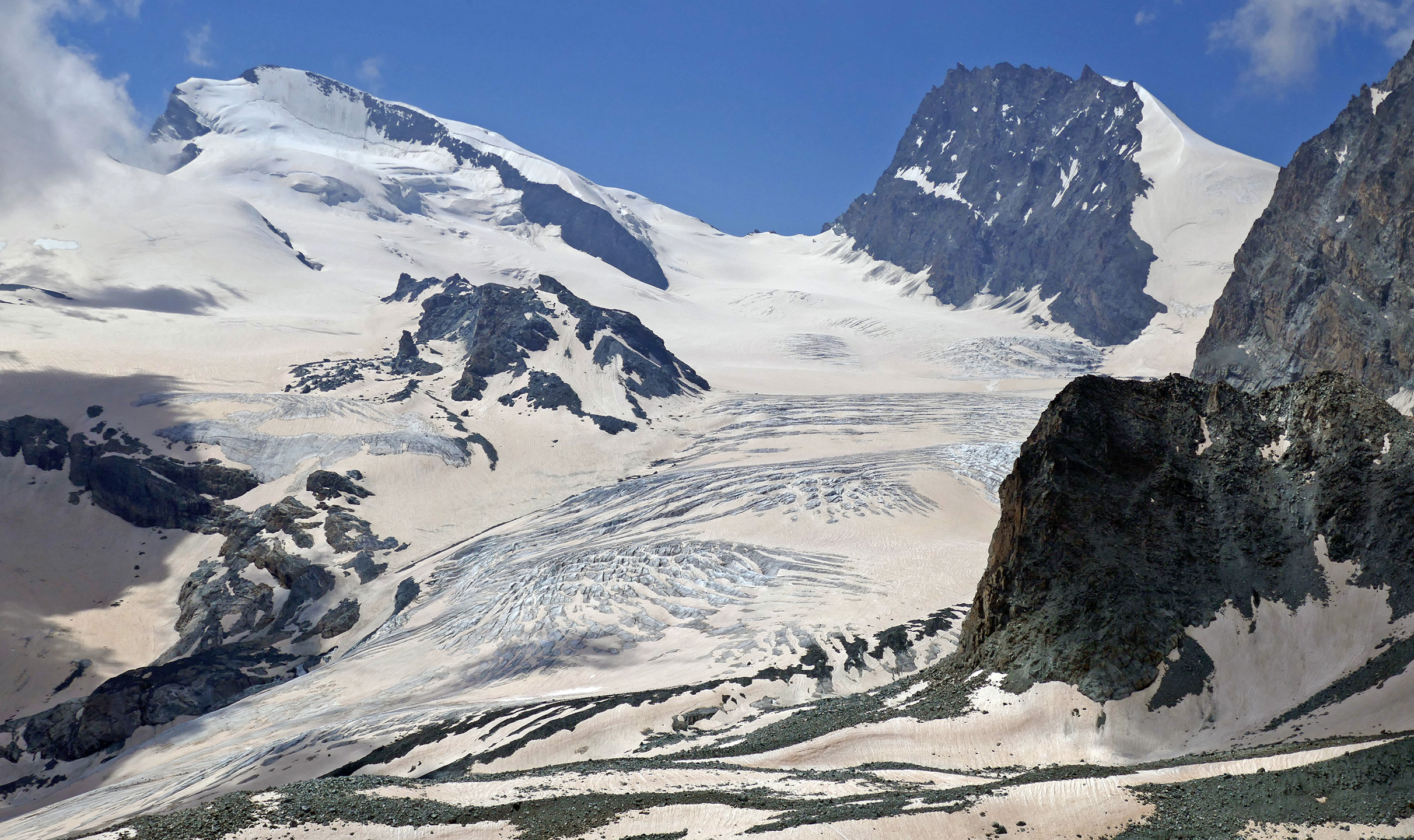
Allalin Glacier

The Allalin Glacier (German: Allalingletscher) is a 6 km (3.7 mi) long glacier (2005) situated in the Pennine Alps near the Allalinhorn in the canton of Valais in Switzerland. In 1973 it had an area of 9.9 km^{2} (3.8 sq mi). The glacier is bordered on the west by the Allalinhorn, Rimpfischhorn and Strahlhorn. It is not to be confused with the Fee Glacier which lies on the northern flank of Allalinhorn.

== Physical evolution ==
Allalin Glacier flows 6.2 km from the north-east face of the Allalinhorn (4,027 m) to a present terminus at ~2,150 m. GLAMOS surveys show the glacier retreated 1,260 m between 1880 and 2022 and its surface area fell from 9.9 km^{2} (1973) to 7.3 km^{2} in 2019. Long-term mass-balance series record a cumulative loss of greater than 33 m water equivalent since 1960, with exceptionally negative years in 2003, 2022 and 2023 when large parts of the ablation zone became snow-free by early July.

== Ice avalanches and Mattmark disaster ==
On 30 August 1965 approximately two million cubic metres of ice detached from the steep tongue during an "active phase" of enhanced basal slip and swept 800 m downvalley, burying construction barracks at the Mattmark dam site and killing 88 workers—the deadliest glacier accident ever recorded in Switzerland. Detailed post-event mapping and photogrammetry revealed that the active phases recur every 1–3 years, driven by seasonal melt-water pressurisation of a thin basal till layer beneath the cold, hanging tongue. A smaller break-off of about 100,000 cubic metres occurred in July 2000 but was successfully forecast days in advance thanks to surface-velocity and icequake monitoring, prompting evacuations along the avalanche path.

== Monitoring and modelling ==
Because of its repeat instabilities Allalin has become a test-bed for early-warning technology. Continuous GPS, radar interferometry and automatic seismic arrays installed since 1998 detect precursory acceleration patterns, log-periodic displacement oscillations and rising icequake rates that typically precede break-off by 2–10 days. Numerical models constrained by these data reproduce the gravity-driven rupture as a transition from distributed creep to localised shear along a temperate–cold ice interface, improving time-to-failure forecasts that are now issued by cantonal authorities whenever sliding speed exceeds 40 cm per day. The glacier is thus one of only a few worldwide where real-time hazard bulletins are routinely disseminated to construction sites, alpine huts and ski lifts in the Saas Valley.

== See also ==
- List of glaciers in Switzerland
- List of glaciers
- Retreat of glaciers since 1850
- Swiss Alps
