= Charles Egmond d'Arcis =

Swiss alpinist

- Born: 1 January 1877; Florence, Italy
- Died: 7 December 1971 (aged 94); Geneva
- Occupation: Journalist
- Known for: Mountaineering, climbing, UIAA President

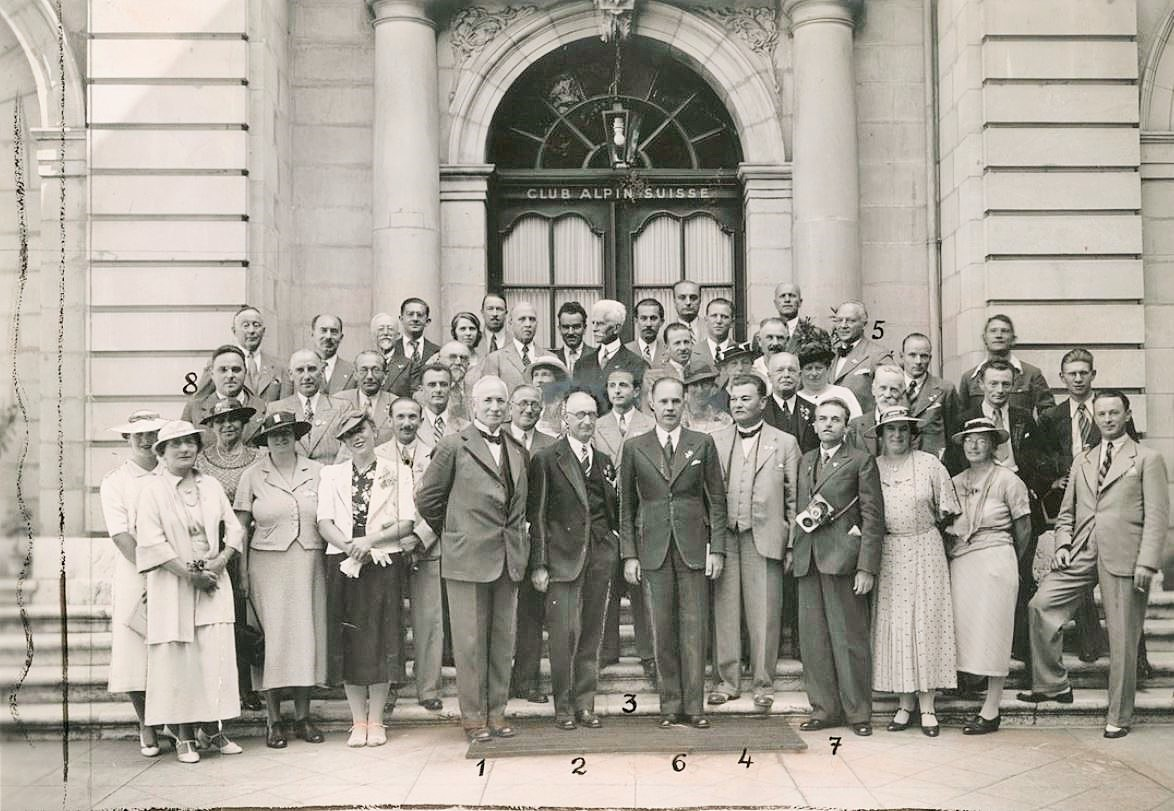
UIAA General Assembly Geneva 1936: 1. Kalbermatten SAC, 2. D'Arcis President. UIAA, 3. Desio CAI, 4. Sjogren Sweden, 5. Lory CAF, 6–8 Goetel, Klemensiewicz, Szatkowski Poland

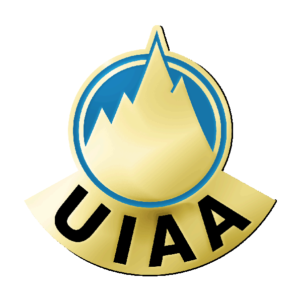
UIAA honorary member medal

Charles Egmond d'Arcis (1887 – 7 December 1971) was a Swiss journalist and alpinist. He was the first president of the International Climbing and Mountaineering Federation (UIAA).

== Biography ==
Arcis grew up in Geneva with two brothers, where he attended school and studied. His father was the Englishman Arthur d'Arcis (1853–1921), his mother was Swiss. He spoke fluent Italian, English, German and French. He studied from 1907 to 1913 at the Faculty of Philosophy and Social Sciences of the University of Geneva and was a member of the student society Zofingia. In 1914 he was a teacher at the Higher Commercial School in Geneva.

In Geneva he worked for English newspapers including The Economist and The Times of London and reported on the activities of the League of Nationses during the interwar period. He was thus acting in an important place and at a crucial time when the League of Nations was putting a lot of energy into maintaining its reputation and image and negotiating its relationship with the press.

After the war, Arcis played a leading role in the internationalisation of the media community and in promoting Geneva as an international city. He was a member and in 1934 president of the Cercle des Amitiés Internationales CAI (International Friendship Circle) and from 1955 to 1956 he served as president of the Association de la Presse Etrangère en Suisse et au Liechtenstein APES. He was a writer and critic with the Tribune de Genève.

In addition to his journalistic activities, he was, like his father and his two brothers, passionate about the mountains and nature, about which he wrote numerous articles and books. In 1905 he joined the Geneva Section of the Swiss Alpine Club (SAC) and later became its president. He was a member of the Valais Association for Natural Sciences ("La Murithienne") and the Geneva Geographical Society. In the Alpine Centre Zermatt, founded in 1944, he served as president.

From 1932 to 1964, he was President of the newly founded UIAA. Like the League of Nations, the UIAA was deeply rooted in Geneva with its international spirit, which was upheld by contemporary authors such as Robert de Traz and the Swiss government. During the war the UIAA presidency was suspended.

In 1964 he became UIAA Honorary Member. He was a member and honorary member of the Association of British Members of the Swiss Alpine Club.

== Publications ==
- with Marcel Raisin: La gare... demeure et ne se vend pas : revue en deux actes et trois tableaux, jouée au Banquet d'Escalade de la Société de Zofingue, le 15 décembre 1909. Imprimerie de la Tribune de Genève, Genf 1909.
- Souvenir de l'inauguration de la Britannia Hut le 17 août 1912 Écho des Alpes: organe du Club alpin suisse pour les sections de langue française, 19. Oktober 1912.
- «Rule, Britannia!». Les Anglais et la Guerre. Delachaux & Niestlé, Neuchâtel 1916.
- with David-Louis Delètra und Emile Thury: Les cabanes de la Section genevoise du C.A.S., 1924.
- En Montagne. Récits et Souvenirs. Editeurs Sonor SA, Genf 1936.
- Neiges éternelles. V. Attinger, Neuchâtel Paris 1945.
- with Walter Schmid: Au vent des quatre mille: dans les Alpes suisses. Payot, Lausanne 1953.
- L'évolution de l'alpinisme. Conquête des Alpes: deux siècles d'art et d'histoire. Musée d'art et d'histoire, Exposition du 26 février au 20 mars 1955.
- with Edouard Wyss-Dunant und Otto Hassler: La Section genevoise du Club alpin suisse, 1865–1965 Genève : Club alpin suisse, 1965.

== Literature ==
- Ilaria Scaglia: The Emotions of Internationalism. Feeling International Cooperation in the Alps in the Interwar Period. University Press, Oxford 2020, ISBN 978-0-19-884832-5
- Martin Andreas Lutz: Britische Propaganda in der Schweiz während des Zweiten Weltkriegs 1939–1945. Dissertation University of Lucerne, Luzern 2019
