= Feechopf =

Mountain in Switzerland

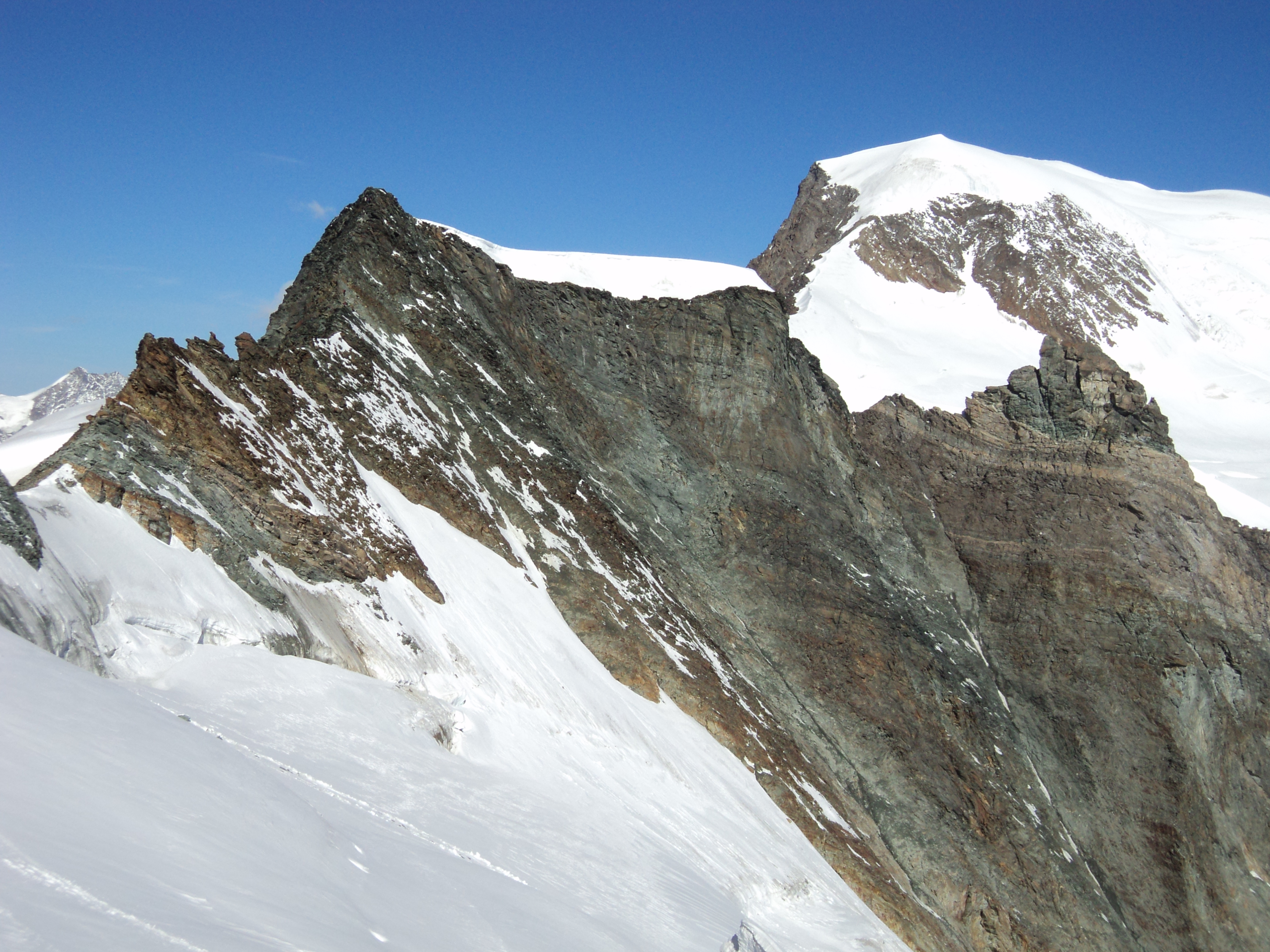
- The Feechopf (left), the Alphubel (right) and, below, the Feechopf-North-Ridge-Gendarme pt 3863 m

Highest point
- Elevation: 3,887 m (12,753 ft)
- Prominence: 79 m (259 ft)
- Parent peak: Allalinhorn
- Coordinates: 46°02′58.8″N 7°52′57.8″E

Geography
- Location within Switzerland
- Location: Valais, Switzerland
- Parent range: Pennine Alps

The Feechopf is a mountain of the Swiss Pennine Alps, located near Saas Fee in the canton of Valais. It lies between the Alphubel and the Allalinhorn. The significant north-ridge-gendarme has a height of 3863 m.
