= Mattmarksee =

Reservoir in Valais, Switzerland

Mattmark dam
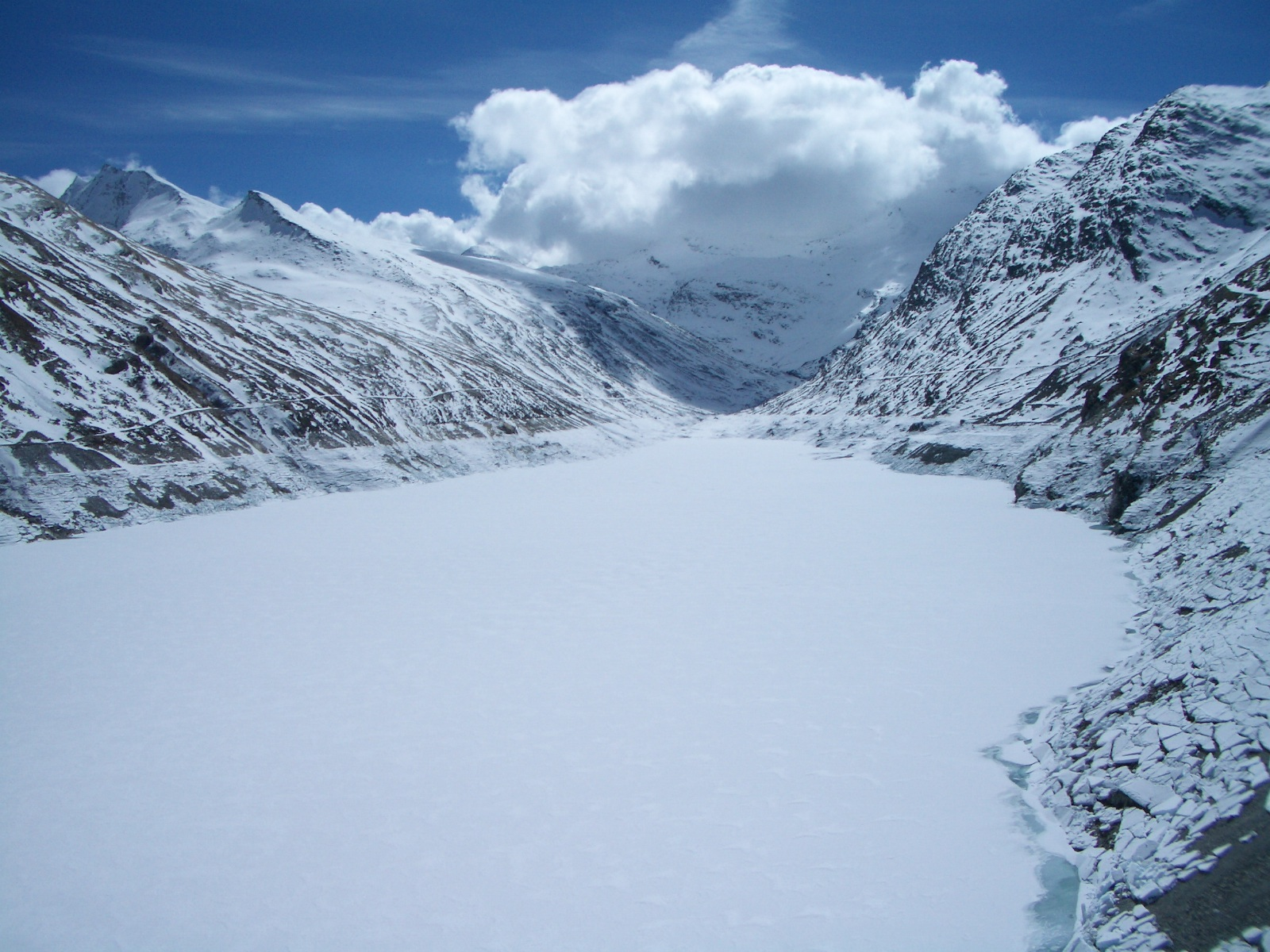

- Location within Canton of Valais Location within Switzerland Location within Alps
- Interactive map of Mattmark dam
- Location: Saas Valley, Valais
- Coordinates: 46°2′17″N 7°57′36″E
- Type: reservoir
- Catchment area: 37.10 km^{2} (14.32 sq mi)
- Basin countries: Switzerland
- Max. length: 3.2 km (2.0 mi)
- Surface area: 1.76 km^{2} (0.68 sq mi)
- Max. depth: 93 m (305 ft)
- Water volume: 100 million cubic metres (81,000 acre⋅ft)
- Surface elevation: 2,197 m (7,208 ft)

Mattmark dam is a reservoir in the Saas Valley of the Canton of Valais, Switzerland. The Mattmark dam was built from 1960 to 1965. The lake's surface area is 1.76 km^{2} (0.68 sq mi).

The lake lies at a height of 2,197 metres above sea level, between the massifs of the Rimpfischhorn and Stellihorn. The highest peak visible from the lake is the Strahlhorn (4,190 m).

== Engineering and dimensions ==
Mattmark is the largest rock-fill/earth dam in Europe: a 120 m-high embankment 780 m long that impounds up to 100 million cubic metres of water behind a 373 m-wide crest. Construction began in 1958 and the first full impoundment was reached in 1969, two years after commissioning. The reservoir's natural catchment of 37 km^{2} is augmented by diversion tunnels that tap several glacial side-valleys, so that almost half of the 88 km^{2} total intake area is glacier-covered.

== Power generation ==
The dam forms the upper basin of Kraftwerke Mattmark AG's storage scheme. Water descends 1,200 m through pressure tunnels to underground turbines at Zermeiggern and Stalden, giving the plant a combined installed capacity of about 130 MW. Annual production averages roughly 625 GWh, enough to power more than 140,000 Swiss households. Shareholders include Axpo (38.9 %), Centralschweizerische Kraftwerke (CKW), (27.8 %) and BKW Energie (11.1 %), with the remaining equity held by the municipalities of Sion and Siders.

== Mattmark disaster ==
On 30 August 1965, 88 construction workers, 56 of them of Italian nationality, were buried under 2,000,000 m³ of ice and debris by a glacier collapse of the Allalin glacier. The risk involved in constructing the accommodation barracks directly below the glacier tongue, which eventually broke off, was not taken into account. No other reservoir in Switzerland claimed so many victims during construction. Seven years after the accident, the Valais judiciary acquitted all 17 defendants, including engineers and managers of Elektrowatt and officials of the Swiss Accident Insurance Fund. In 2005, journalist Kurt Marti revealed that those responsible for the construction site knew about the dangers of the Allalin glacier and that the court ignored all incriminating facts in its decision.

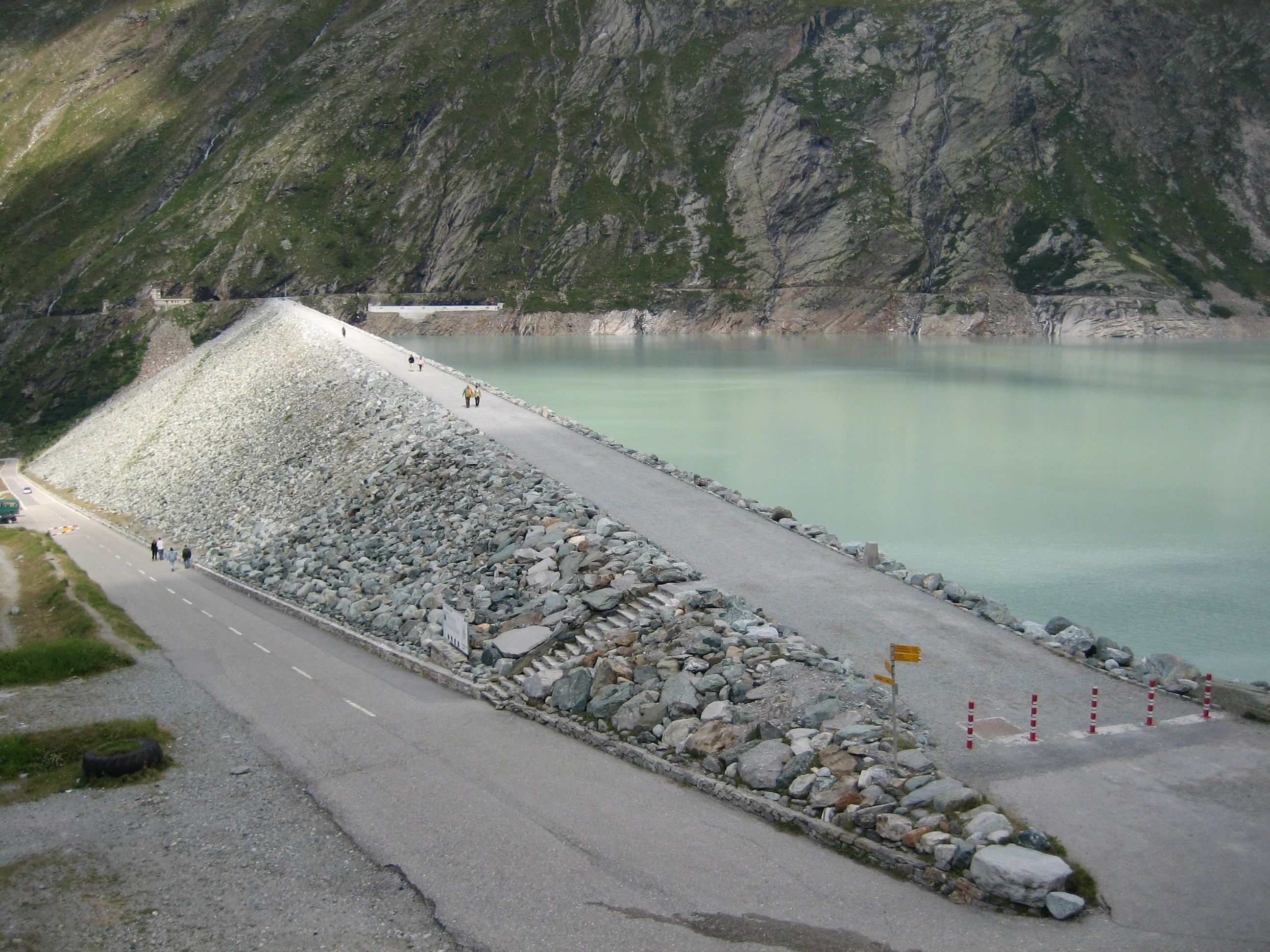
Mattmark dam

== See also ==
- List of lakes of Switzerland
- List of mountain lakes of Switzerland
