= Georgy Hut =

Coordinates: 46°29′14″N 9°57′21″E

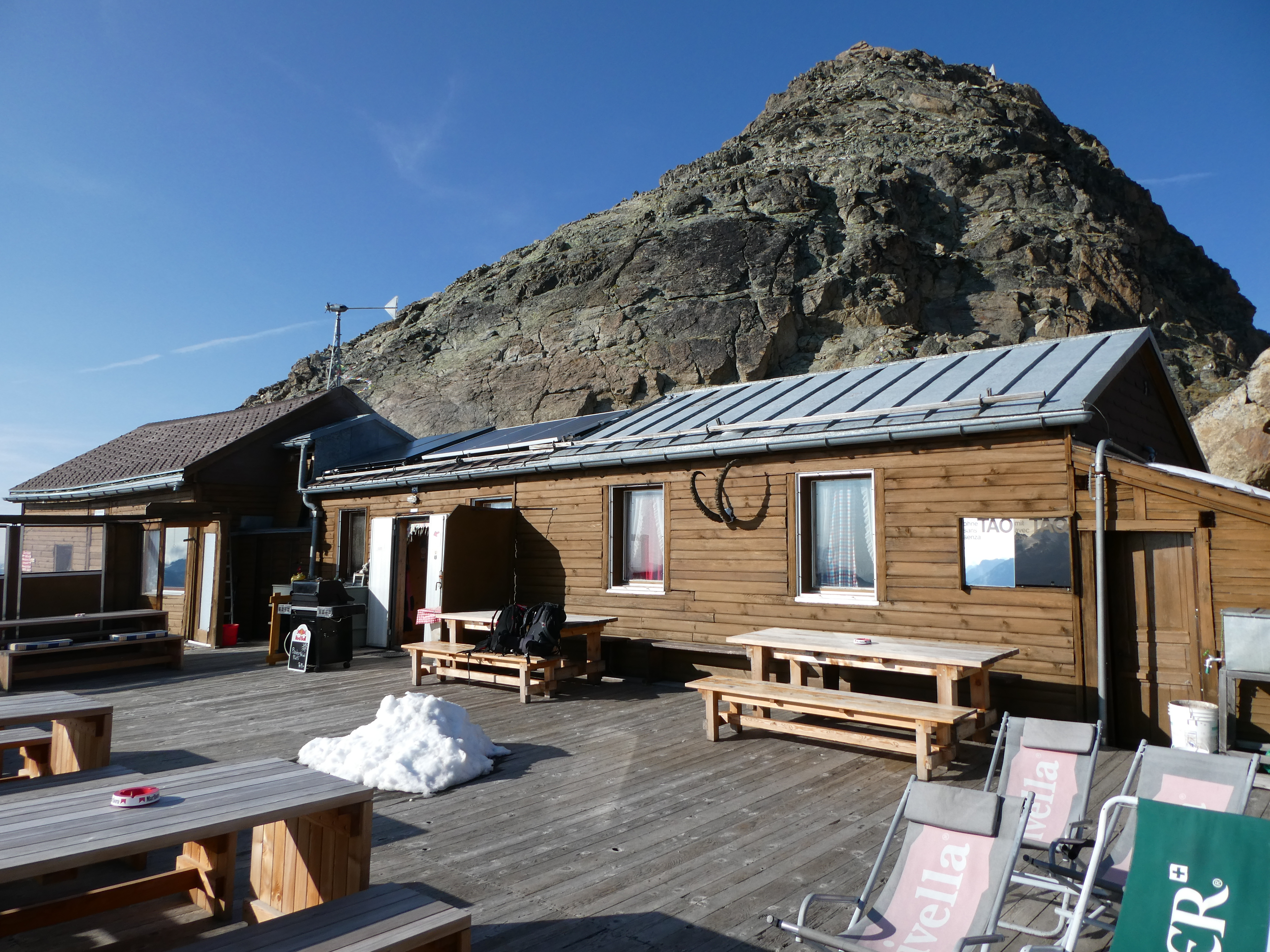
Georgy Hut, in the background Piz Languard.

The Georgy Hut (Romansh: Chamanna Georgy, German: Georgyhütte or Georgy's Hütte) is a mountain hut in the Swiss Alps, located on Piz Languard, above Pontresina. At 3,175 metres above sea level, it is the highest mountain hut in the canton of Graubünden.

== See also ==
- List of buildings and structures above 3000 m in Switzerland
