= Weingartensee =

Lake in Valais, Switzerland

- Location within Canton of Valais Location within Piedmont Location within Switzerland Location within Italy Location within Alps
- Interactive map of Weingartensee
- Location: Valais
- Coordinates: 46°03′48″N 7°50′20″E
- Basin countries: Switzerland
- Surface area: 0.64 ha (1.6 acres)
- Surface elevation: 3,058 m (10,033 ft)

The Weingartensee is a small lake located east of Täsch at the foot of the Alphubel, in the Swiss canton of Valais. The lake has a surface area of 0.64 ha and is located at 3,058 metres above sea level. It lies near the bottom of the Weingartengletscher glacier.

Following the flood of June 2001, a dam was built and the water level was slightly reduced.
