= Felskinn =

Mountain in Switzerland

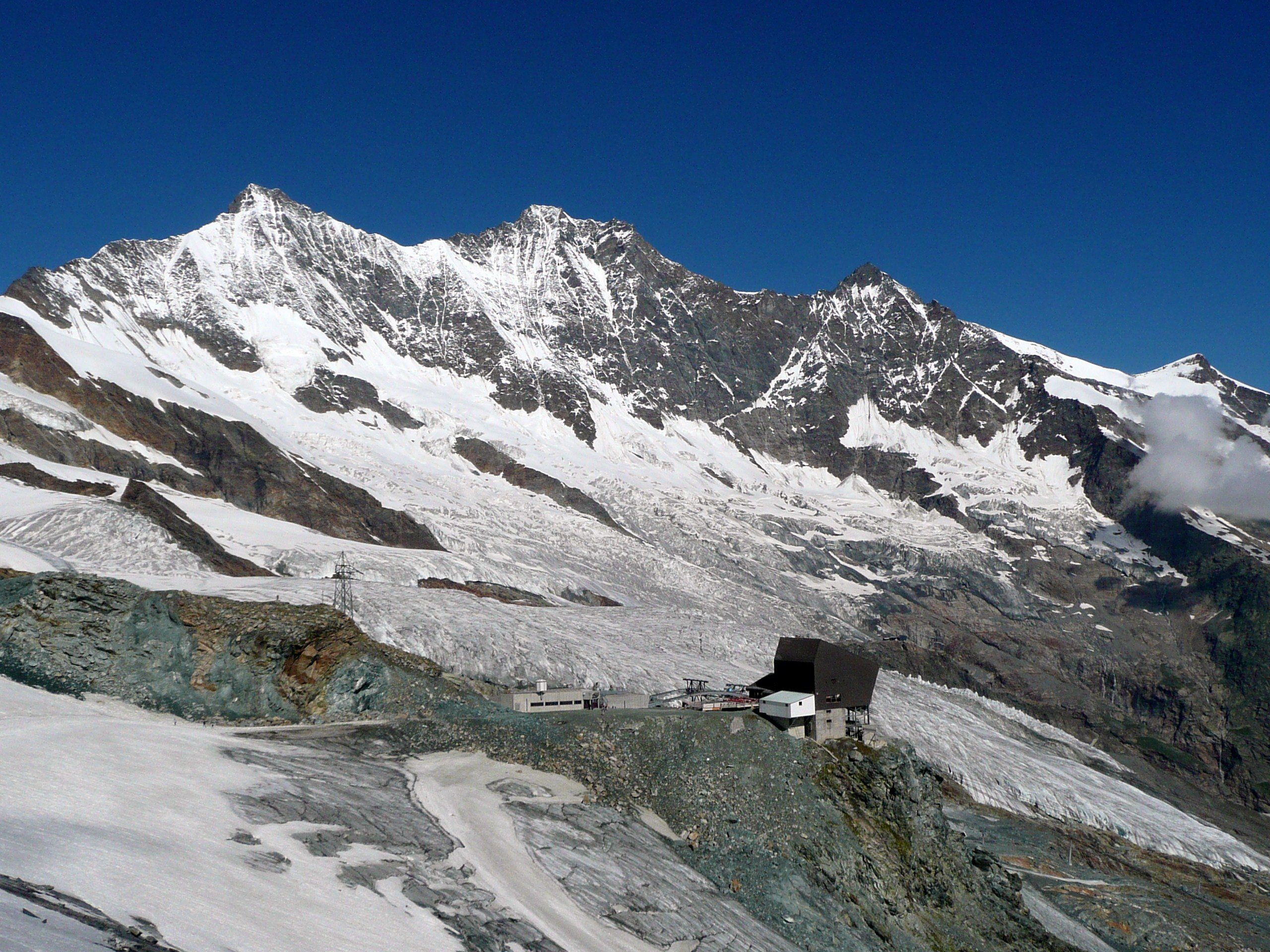

Highest point
- Elevation: 2,989 m (9,806 ft)
- Coordinates: 46°4′6.5″N 7°54′55.7″E

Geography
- Location within Switzerland
- Location: Valais, Switzerland
- Parent range: Pennine Alps

Climbing
- Easiest route: Aerial tramway

Felskinn is a rocky outcrop of the Pennine Alps, situated above Saas Fee in the canton of Valais.

Felskinn is the lower station of the Metro Alpin which gives access to the Mittelallalin.
