= Rothorn Hut =

Mountain hut in Valais, Switzerland

Coordinates: 46°02′55″N 7°41′51″E

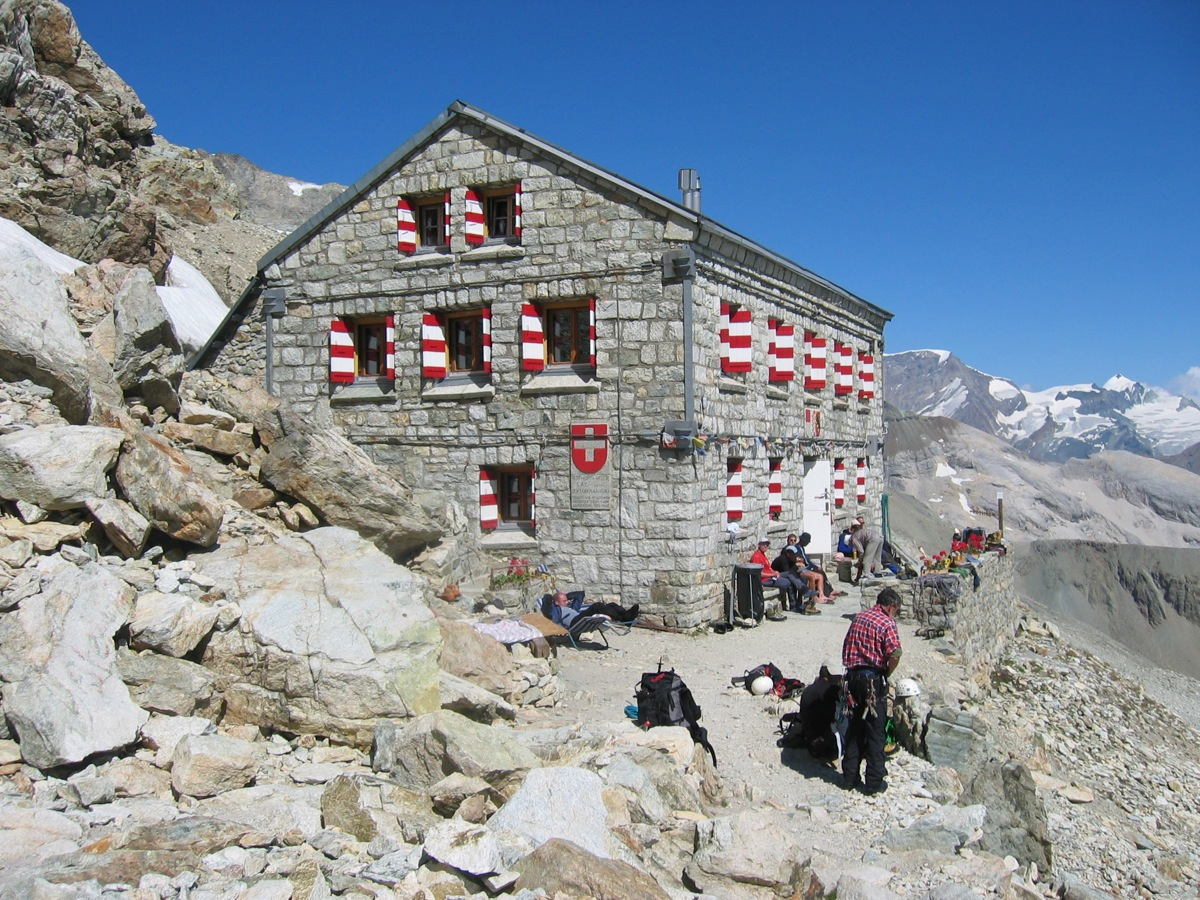
The Rothorn Hut

The Rothorn Hut (German: Rothornhütte) is an alpine hut, located above Zermatt in the canton of Valais. It is located at a height of 3,198 metres above sea level, at the foot of the Zinalrothorn. It can be accessed via the Trift valley by a trail from Zermatt.

== See also ==
- List of buildings and structures above 3000 m in Switzerland
