= Ferpècle Glacier =

Glacier in Switzerland

Coordinates: 46°1′39″N 7°34′17″E

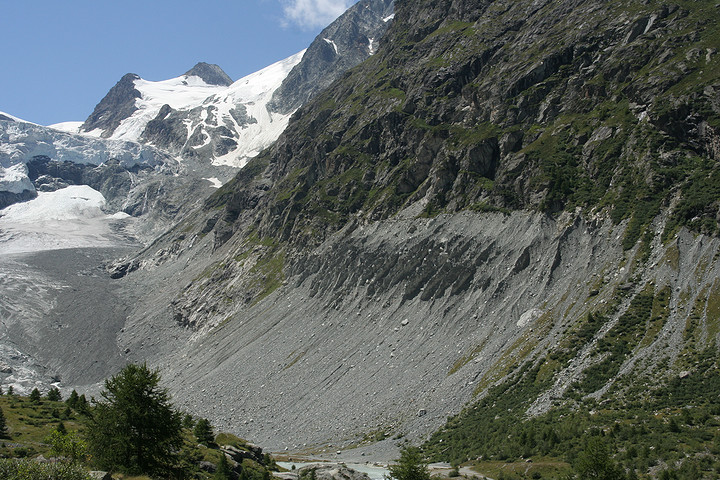
view of glacier

The Ferpècle Glacier (French: Glacier de Ferpècle) is a 6.5 km (4.0 mi) long glacier (2005) situated in the Pennine Alps in the canton of Valais in Switzerland. In 1973 it had an area of 9.8 km^{2} (3.8 sq mi).

== See also ==
- List of glaciers in Switzerland
- List of glaciers
- Retreat of glaciers since 1850
- Swiss Alps
