= Strahlhorn =

Mountain of the Swiss Pennine Alps

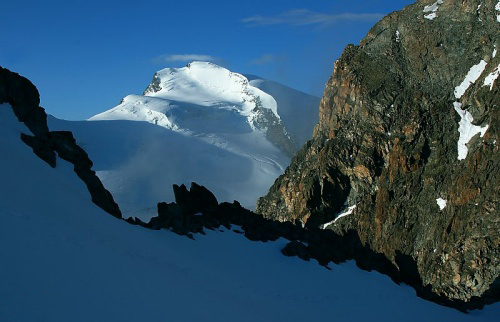

Highest point
- Elevation: 4,190 m (13,750 ft)
- Prominence: 404 m (1,325 ft)
- Parent peak: Rimpfischhorn
- Coordinates: 46°00′47.6″N 7°54′06.3″E

Geography
- Location within Switzerland
- Location: Valais
- Country: Switzerland
- Parent range: Pennine Alps
- Topo map: Swiss Federal Office of Topography swisstopo

Climbing
- First ascent: 15 August 1854 by Christopher Smyth, Ulrich Lauener, Edmund J. Grenville and Franz-Josef Andenmatten
- Easiest route: Basic snow climb

The Strahlhorn (4,190 m) is a mountain of the Swiss Pennine Alps, located south of Saas-Fee and east of Zermatt in the canton of Valais. It lies on the range that separates the Mattertal from the Saastal and is located approximately halfway between the Rimpfischhorn and the Schwarzberghorn.

There are three less known peaks of the same name in Switzerland (3027m, 3194m, 3200m).

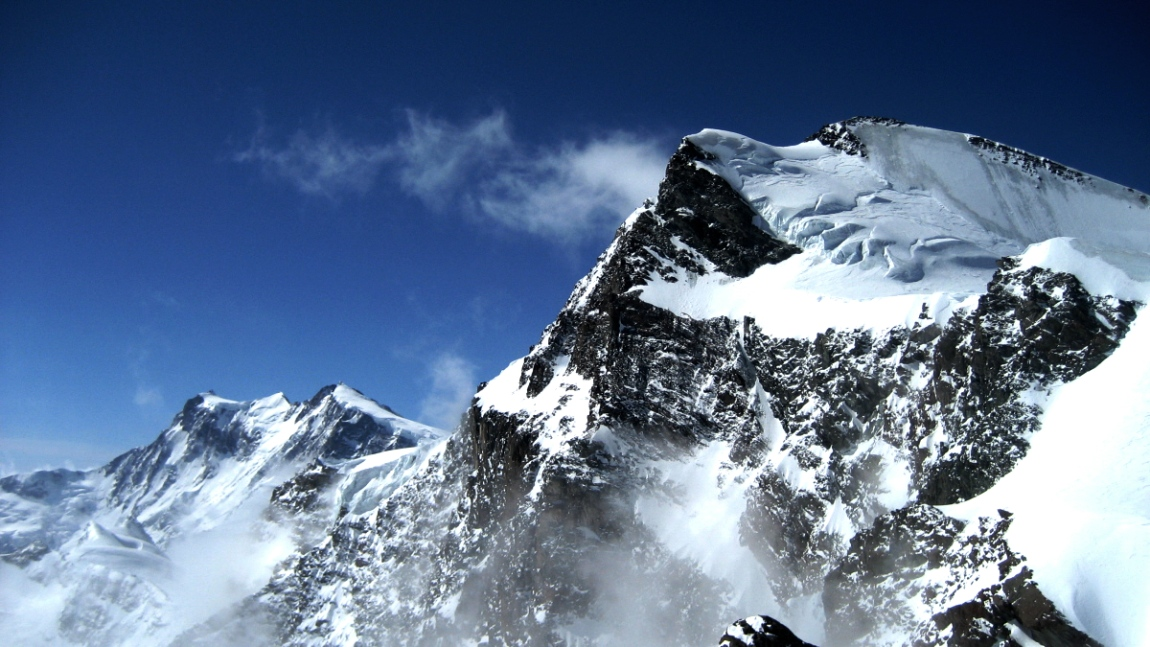
Monte Rosa and Strahlhorn (right)

== See also ==
- List of 4000 metre peaks of the Alps

== Sources ==
- Dumler, Helmut and Willi P. Burkhardt, The High Mountains of the Alps, London: Diadem, 1994
