= Saastal =

Alpine valley in Switzerland

Coordinates: 46°07′N 7°56′E

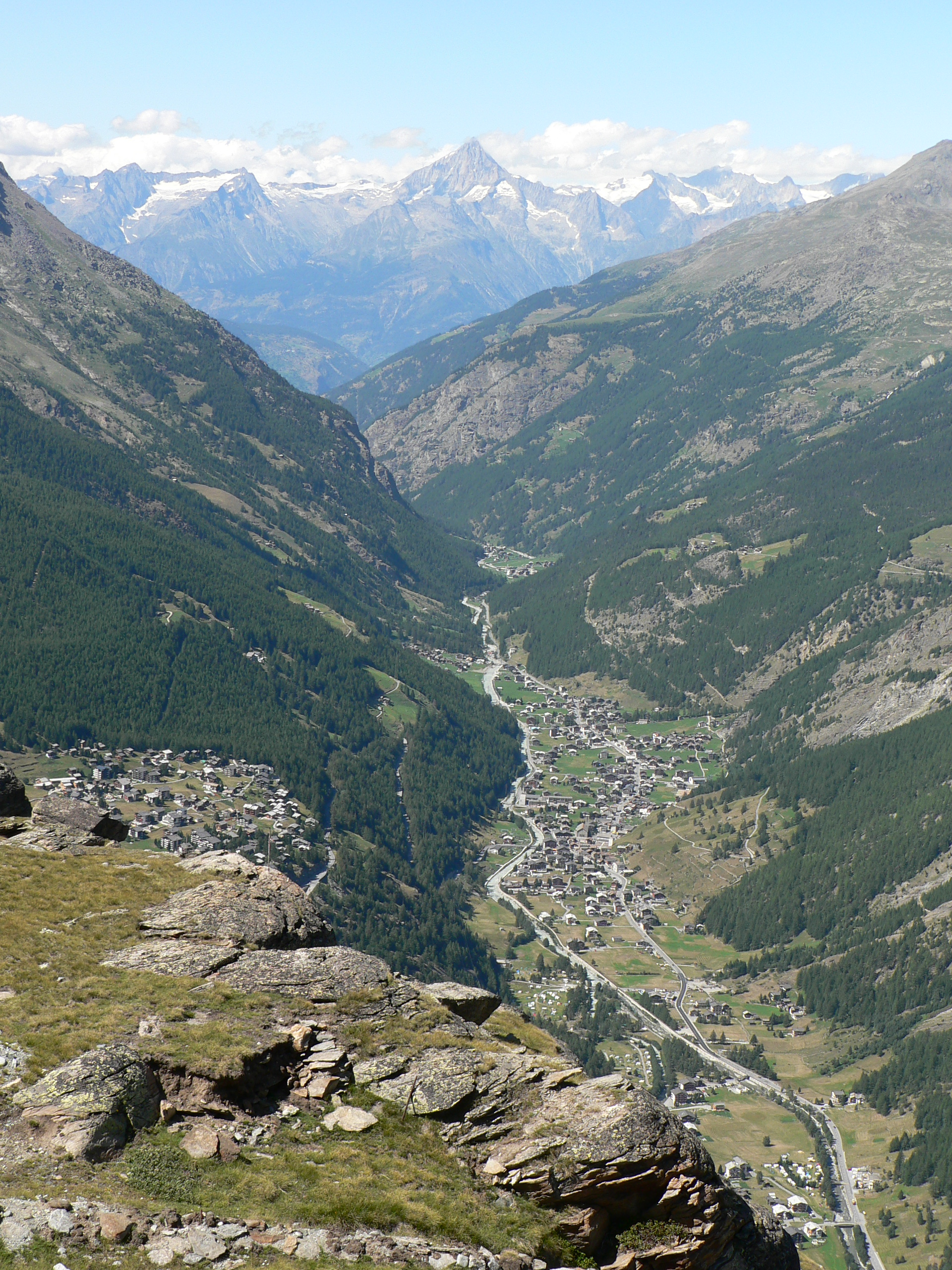
Saastal with Saas-Fee and Saas-Grund

The Saastal or the Saas Valley is an alpine valley in the district of Visp, in the eastern part of the Canton of Valais, Switzerland. It is the valley of the river Saaser Vispa. It is separated from the Mattertal to the west by the Mischabel massif. Villages in the valley are, upstream, Eisten, Saas-Balen, Saas-Grund, Saas-Fee and Saas-Almagell. Until 1893, the municipalities of Almagell, Balen, Fee and Grund were a single parish, with the only church in Grund. Mattmarksee is a reservoir built in the 1960s.

The region hosts an extensive winter sports region, comprising the separate ski areas of Saas-Fee, Saas-Grund and Saas-Almagell. As well as individual ski passes a combined pass is available; each of these areas is connected to the other parts of the region by postal bus, rather than dedicated skilifts.

== Geography ==
The Saastal (Saas Valley) is an alpine valley in the district of Visp, in the eastern part of the Canton of Valais, Switzerland. It forms the catchment of the Saaser Vispa, which flows northwards to join the Rhône at Visp. The valley is flanked to the west by the Mischabel massif, whose highest summit, the Dom (4,545 m), is the tallest peak entirely within Swiss territory. Villages in the Saastal, from lowermost to uppermost, are Eisten, Saas-Balen, Saas-Grund, Saas-Fee and Saas-Almagell.

== History ==
Until 1893, the four modern municipalities of Almagell, Balen, Fee and Grund formed a single ecclesiastical parish, with the sole church located in Saas-Grund. Administrative separation into the current four communes only took place when each built its own local church and civil administration.

== Infrastructure ==
In the early 1960s, the Mattmarksee reservoir was constructed high in the valley to serve hydroelectric schemes and regulate seasonal runoff. The dam, completed in 1965, impounds meltwater from the Fee Glacier and supplements winter sports infrastructure by ensuring reliable water supply for snowmaking.

On 30 August 1965 an approximately 2 million-cubic metre ice avalanche broke from the Allalin Glacier and engulfed the Mattmark dam construction site at the head of the Saastal, killing 88 workers. The accident, the worst alpine construction disaster in Swiss history, delayed completion of the hydro-electric project and led to tighter national safety standards for working beneath hanging glaciers.

== Tourism and economy ==
Since the mid-20th century, the Saastal has developed into a major winter sports destination. Three separate ski areas—Saas-Fee, Saas-Grund and Saas-Almagell—offer over 150 km of pistes, all linked by postal bus rather than inter-resort lifts. A single combined ski pass provides access to all three, while summer tourism focuses on glacier excursions, high-alpine hiking and mountaineering.

The Saastal's landscape is dominated by almost twenty glaciers, but they are shrinking rapidly. Glacier Monitoring Switzerland (GLAMOS) reported that the country lost about 10 % of its total ice volume during the hot summers of 2022 and 2023 alone, the steepest two-year decline on record. Southern Valais glaciers, including the Fee and Allalin ice bodies above Saas-Fee, recorded some of the greatest thickness losses, and several small cirque glaciers vanished entirely.

== Maps ==
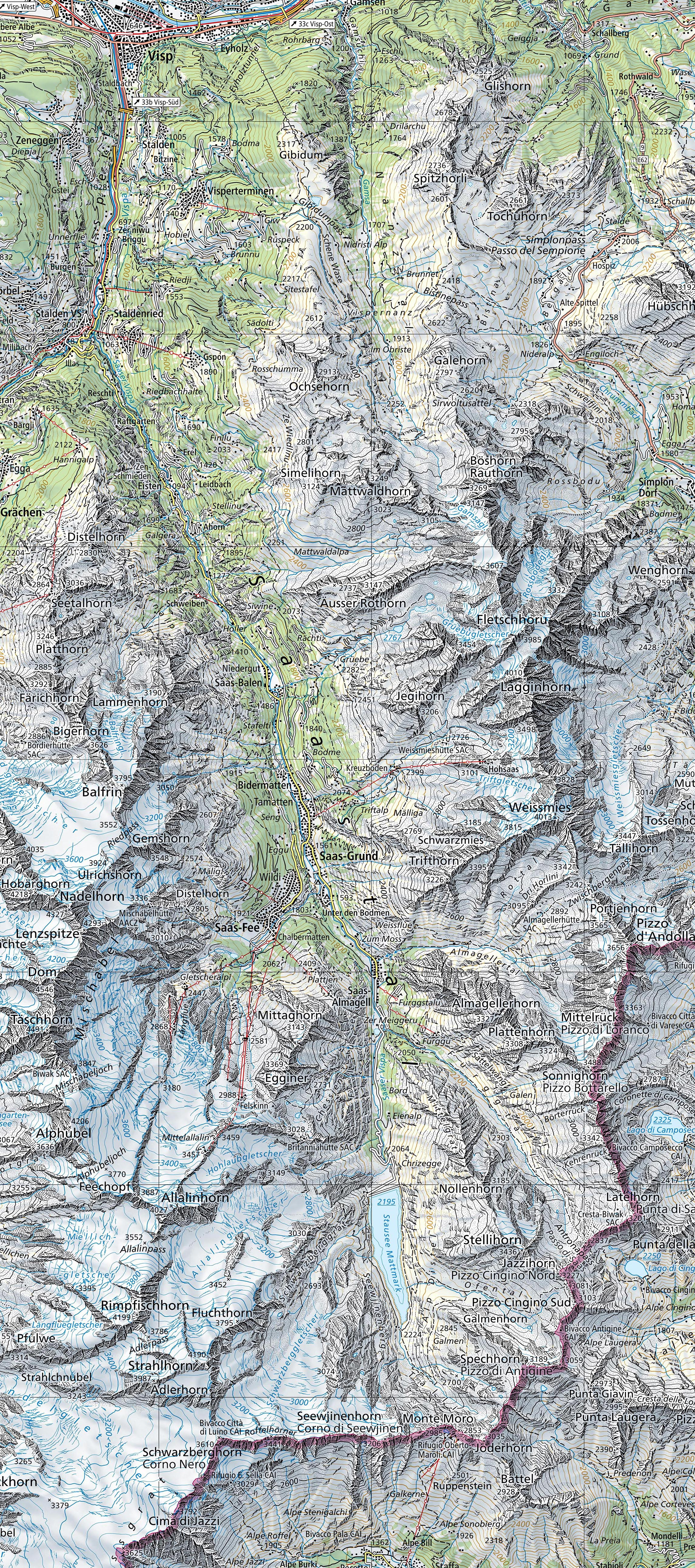
Swisstopo map of the Saastal in the canton of Valais. Its confluence with the Mattertal to its west is visible in the north, as well as the Rhône valley. The 4000m peaks of the Weissmies, Lagginhorn, Rimpfischhorn, Allainhorn, Taschhorn, Dom, Lenzspitze and Hobarghorn are visible surrounding the valley.
