= Schwarzberg Glacier =

Glacier in Switzerland

Coordinates: 46°0′19″N 7°55′40″E

The Schwarzberg Glacier (German: Schwarzberggletscher) is a 3 km long glacier (2005) situated in the Pennine Alps in the canton of Valais in Switzerland. In 1973 it had an area of 6.09 km^{2}. A measurement in 2004 showed its area to be 5.33 km^{2}. In September 2010, its length was surveyed to be 3.66 km.

== See also ==
- List of glaciers in Switzerland
- Swiss Alps
