= Mittelallalin =

Summit below the Allalinhorn in Switzerland

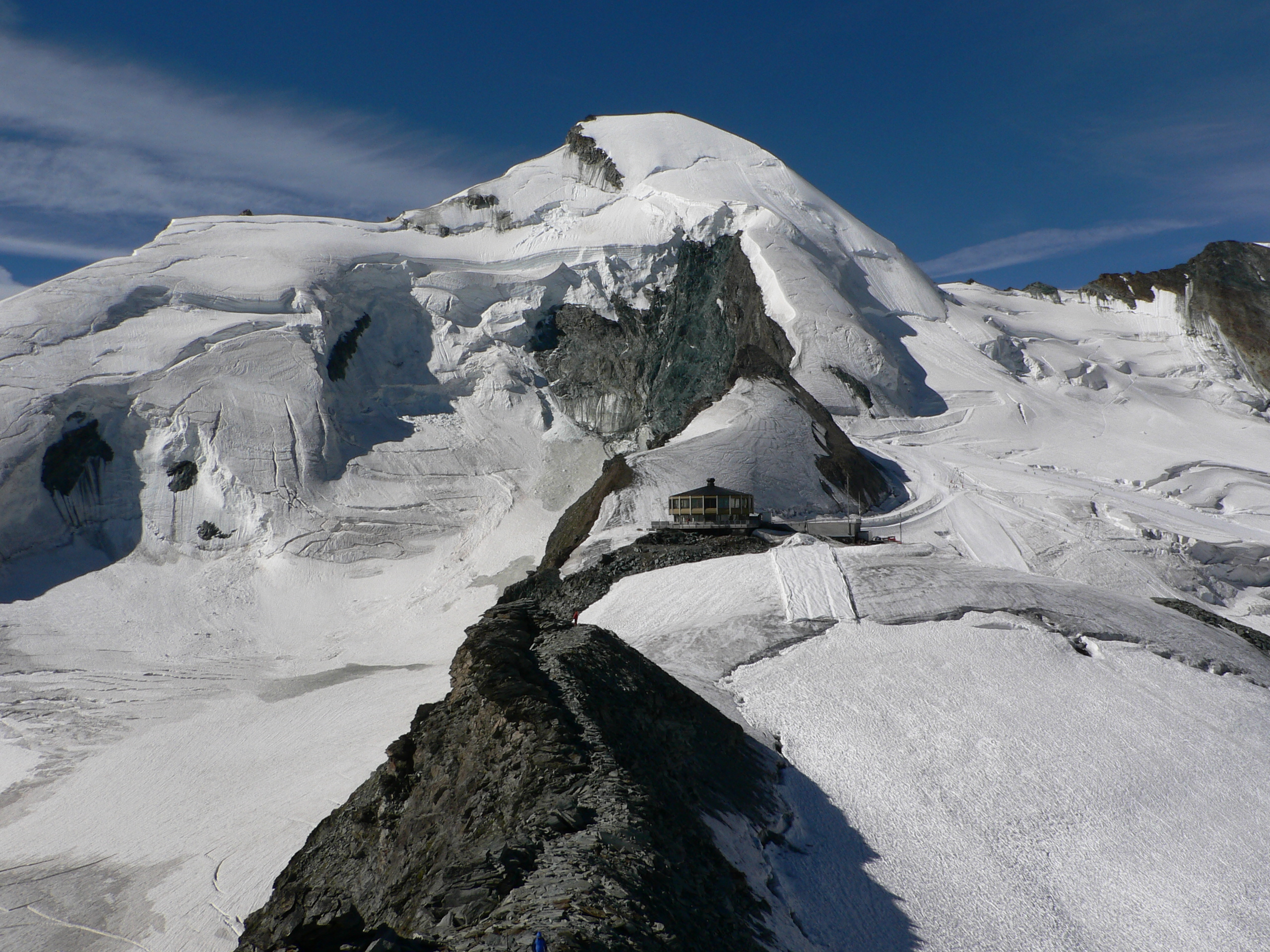
- The Allalinhorn behind Mittelallalin

Highest point
- Elevation: 3,456 m (11,339 ft)
- Coordinates: 46°03′28″N 7°54′18″E

Geography
- Location within Switzerland
- Location: Valais, Switzerland
- Parent range: Pennine Alps

Climbing
- Easiest route: Cable car

The Mittelallalin (3,456 metres (11,339 ft)) is a minor summit below the Allalinhorn situated above Saas Fee. This place is well known for the revolving restaurant which is the highest in the world and a glacier cave.

== Access ==
Mittelallalin can be reached easily by cable car from Saas Fee to the Felskinn intermediate station and finally to the top with the Metro Alpin, the highest funicular in the world.

== Ski and mountain-climbing ==
The Mittelallalin is also an all year round ski area (between 1,800 and 3,600 metres (5,900 and 11,800 ft) in winter, Fee Glacier in summer). From there the ascent of Allalinhorn 4,027 metres (13,212 ft) is very popular and can be done in just two hours.

== See also ==
- List of ski areas and resorts in Switzerland
- Swiss Alps
