= Mattertal =

Valley in southwestern Switzerland

Coordinates: 46°05′N 7°48′E

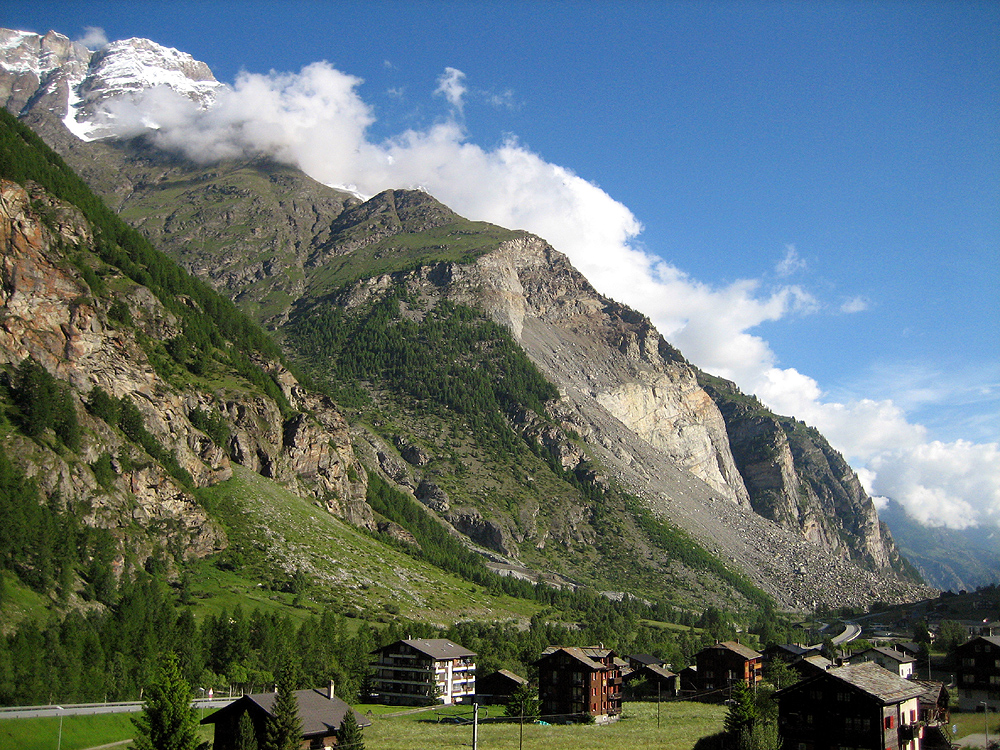
A large debris fan, deposited by a rockslide in the 1990s, can be seen above the village of Randa in the Matter valley.

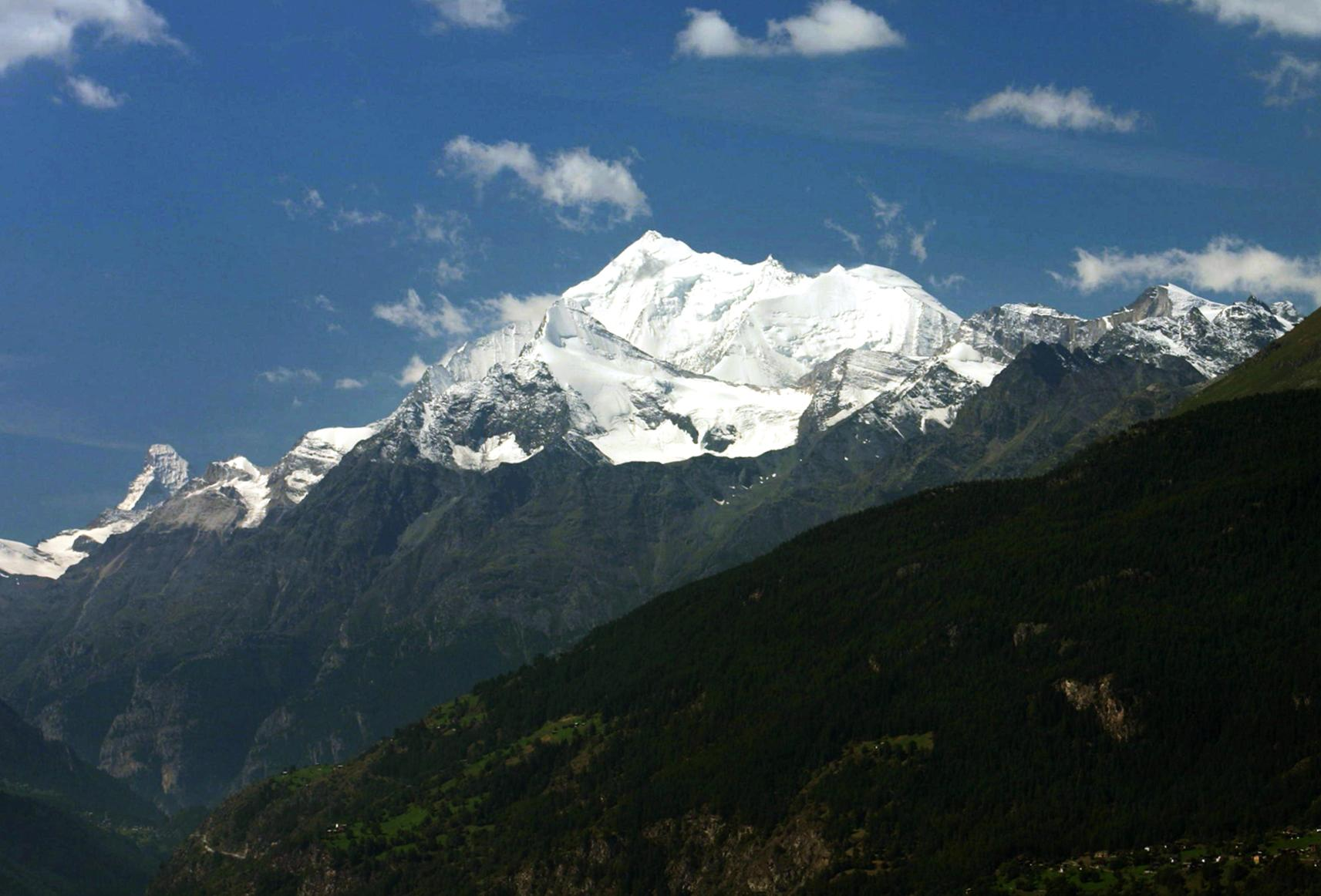
The Weisshorn above the Matter valley (background).

The Matter Valley (German: Mattertal, or sometimes Nikolaital) is located in southwestern Switzerland, south of the Rhône valley in the canton of Valais. The village of Zermatt is the most important settlement of the valley, which is surrounded by many four-thousanders, including the Matterhorn.

== Geography ==
Located in the Pennine Alps, the Matter Valley is drained by the Matter Vispa, a tributary of the Rhone. The valley itself ends at Stalden where it meets the Saas Valley. The resulting Visp Valley continues for a few kilometres until it reaches the town of Visp on the young river Rhone. The valley starts between the high summits south of Zermatt (Monte Rosa, Matterhorn) on the border with Italy. The upper side is glaciated, the second largest glacier of the Alps, the Gorner Glacier lies at the foot of Monte Rosa (4,634 m), while the Zmutt Glacier lies at the foot of the Matterhorn (4,478 m). Around the village of Randa are located the Weisshorn (4,505 m) and the Dom (4,545 m). The difference of height between the talweg and the summits on both side reaches over 3 km. The total length of the valley is about 40 km.

=== Settlements ===
Zermatt (1,600 m), with approx. 5,600 inhabitants, is the largest and highest town in the valley. St. Niklaus follows with 2,400 inhabitants. Between them are located the smaller villages of Täsch and Randa. The villages of Grächen, Embd and Törbel are located above the valley. Stalden, located at the end of the valley, is the lowest village (800 m).

== Transport ==
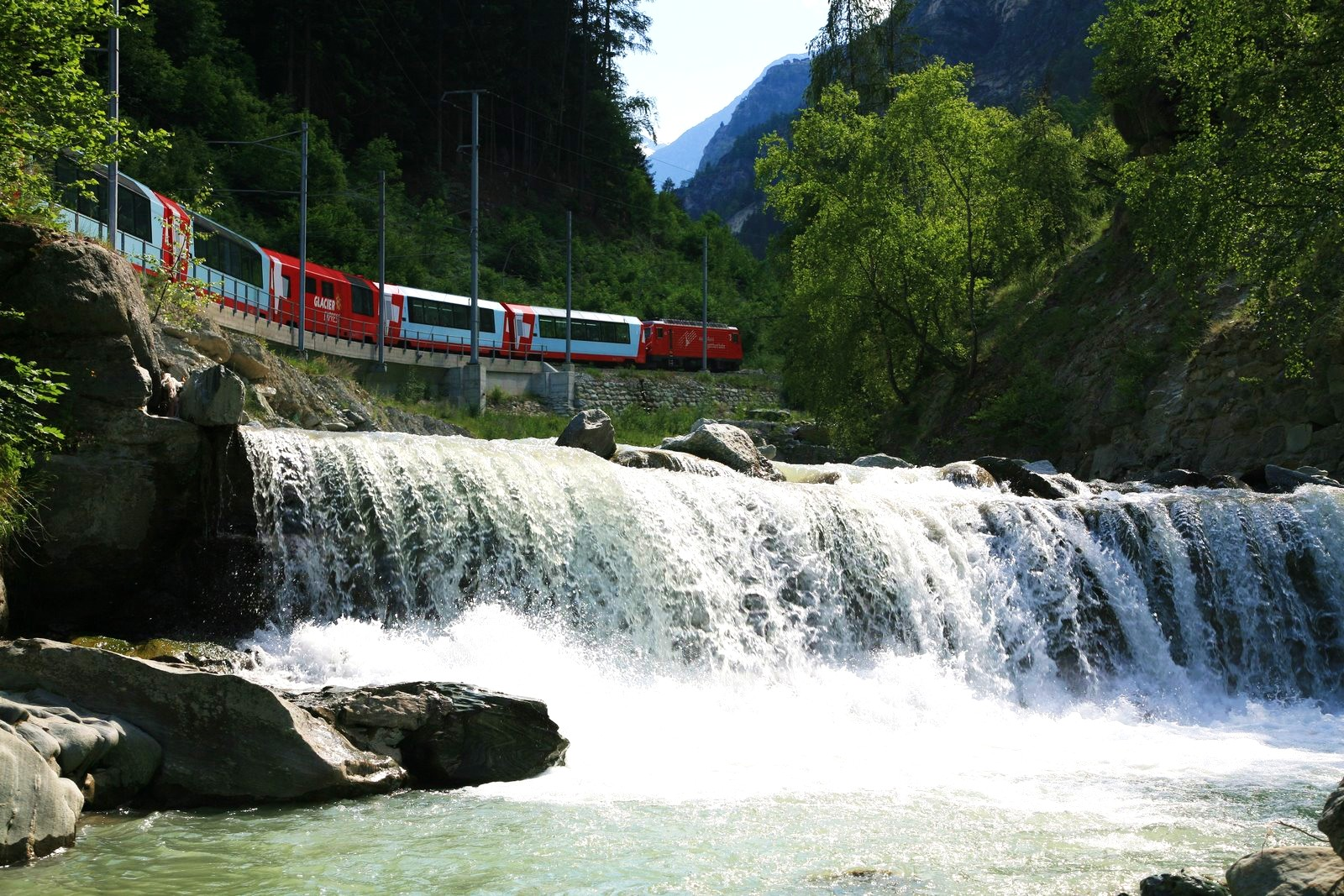
The Glacier Express along the Matter Vispa

Since the end of the nineteenth century the upper end of the valley is connected by rail from Visp (Matterhorn Gotthard Bahn). If the main road connect Zermatt from Visp, it cannot be used between Täsch and Zermatt, the latter being completely car-free.

Since 1930 the valley is directly connected to St. Moritz by the Glacier Express panoramic train.

== Maps ==
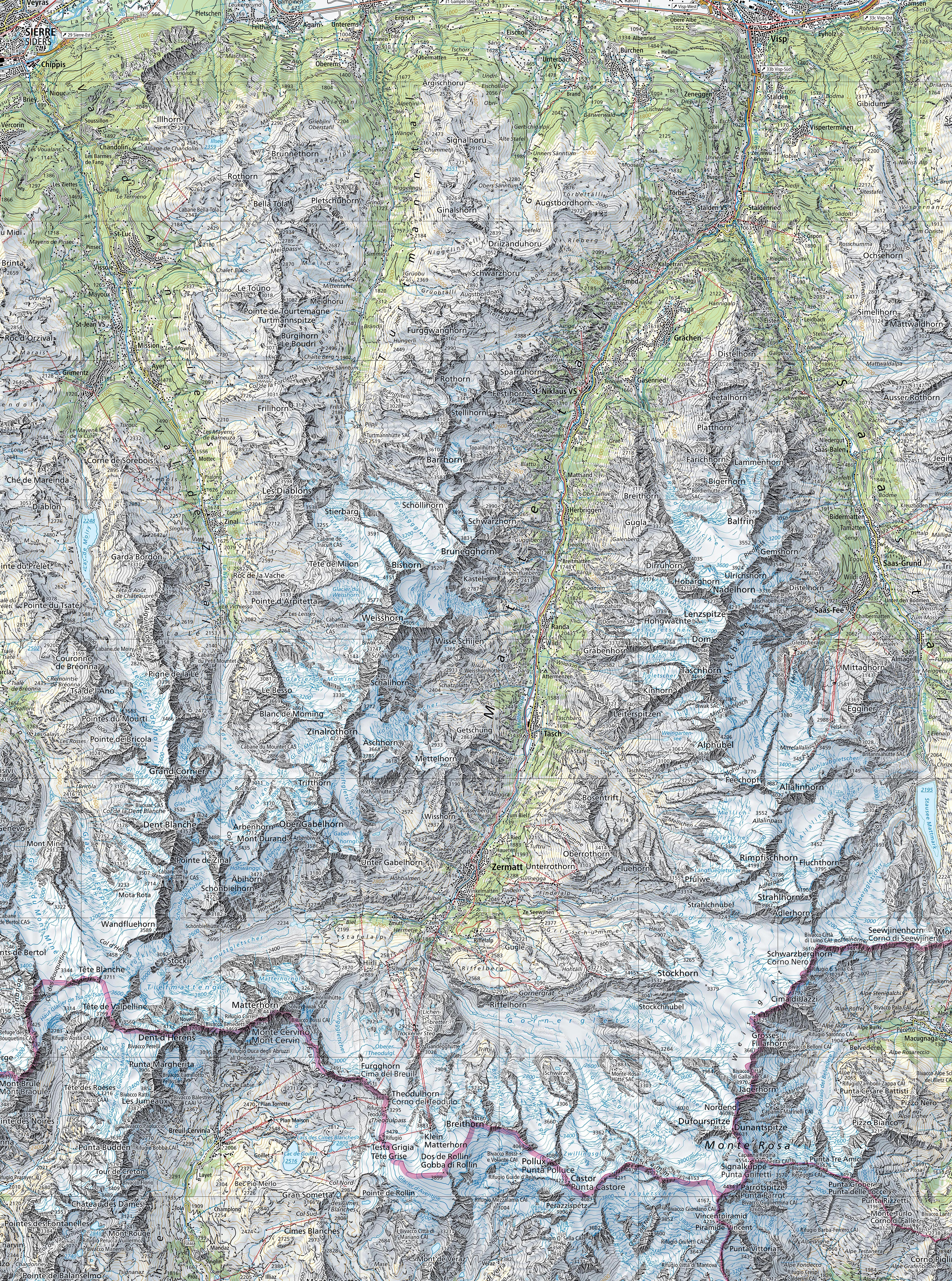
Swisstopo map of the Mattertal (Matter Valley) within the canton of Valais. The Rhône valley is visible to the north. The Matterhorn can be seen to the southwest of Zermatt, as well as Monte Rosa to the southeast. The thick red line traces the Swiss-Italian border. The Mattertal and Saastal have a confluence towards the north.
