= Täsch =

- Municipality
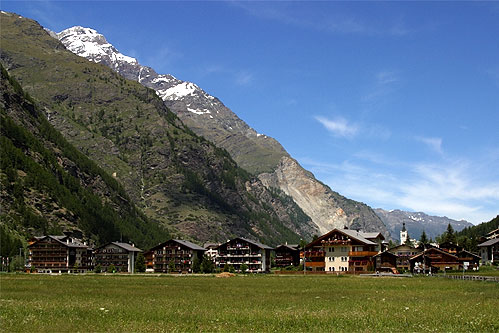
- Täsch village

- Flag Coat of arms
- Location of Täsch
- Location within Switzerland Location within Canton of Valais
- Coordinates: 46°04′N 7°46′E
- Country: Switzerland
- Canton: Valais
- District: Visp

Government
  - Mayor: Christoph Imboden

Area
  - Total: 58.71 km^{2} (22.67 sq mi)
- Elevation: 1,449 m (4,754 ft)

Population (December 2002)
  - Total: 837
  - Density: 14.3/km^{2} (36.9/sq mi)
- Time zone: UTC+01:00 (CET)
  - Summer (DST): UTC+02:00 (CEST)
- Postal code: 3929
- SFOS number: 6295
- ISO 3166 code: CH-VS
- Surrounded by: Ayer, Randa, Saas Almagell, Saas Fee, Zermatt
- Website: gemeinde.taesch.ch

Täsch is a municipality in the district of Visp in the canton of Valais in Switzerland. It is located about 5 km (3.1 mi) north of Zermatt. The local language is Swiss German.

== History ==
Täsch is first mentioned in 1302 as Tech. In Latin it was known as Pera.

== Geography ==
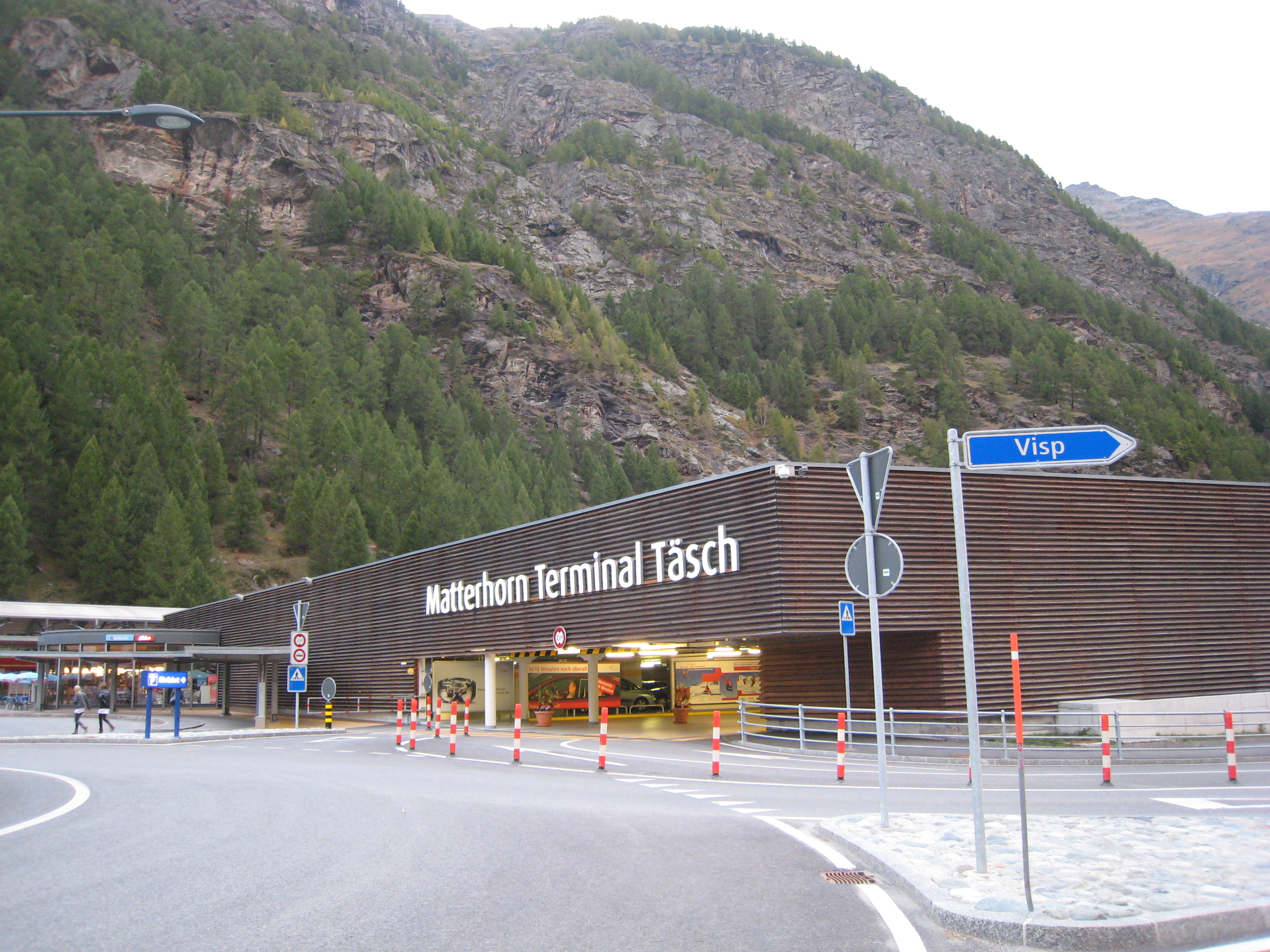
The main way to reach the car-free town of Zermatt and the Matterhorn is through the Matterhorn station in Täsch

Täsch has an area, as of 2011, of 58.7 square kilometers (22.7 mi^{2}). Of this area, 11.7% is used for agricultural purposes, while 9.3% is forested. Of the rest of the land, 0.9% is settled (buildings or roads) and 78.1% is unproductive land.

The municipality is located in the Visp district, in the Mattertal valley, which contains almost all the highest peaks in the Alps such as Monte Rosa, Dom and Weisshorn. The 4,490 m (14,730 ft) high Täschhorn lies directly above the village. It consists of the village of Täsch and the hamlets of Zermettjen and Täschberg as well as the Täschalp hiking region.

== Transportation ==
Zermatt is a car-free town at the end of the valley, so the only connection is the frequent train shuttle from Täsch railway station. Car drivers can park their cars at Täsch and continue to Zermatt by train.

== Coat of arms ==
The blazon of the municipal coat of arms is Gules a Fess Argent, in chief a Mullet [of Six] of the same.

== Demographics ==
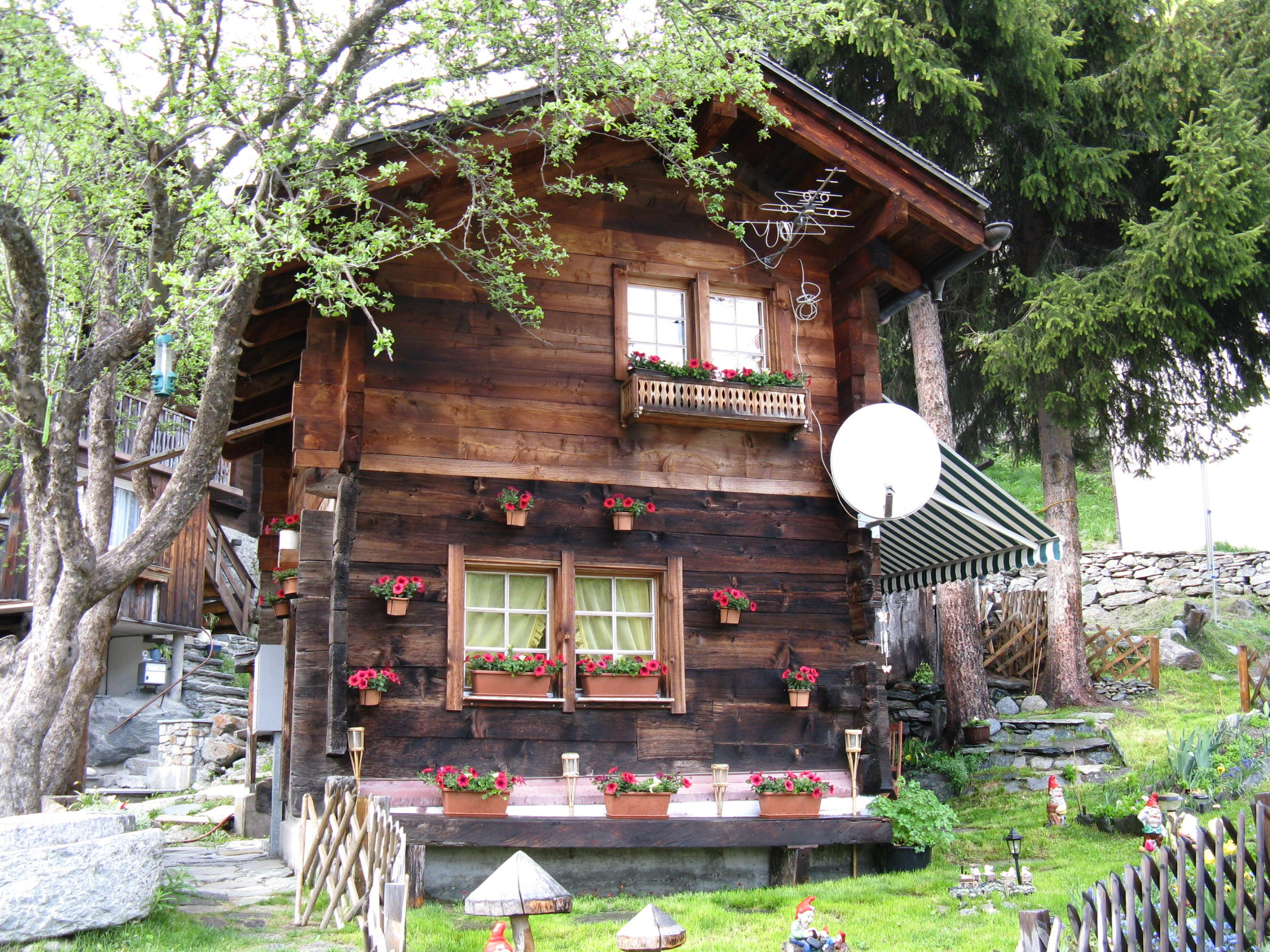
A house in Täsch

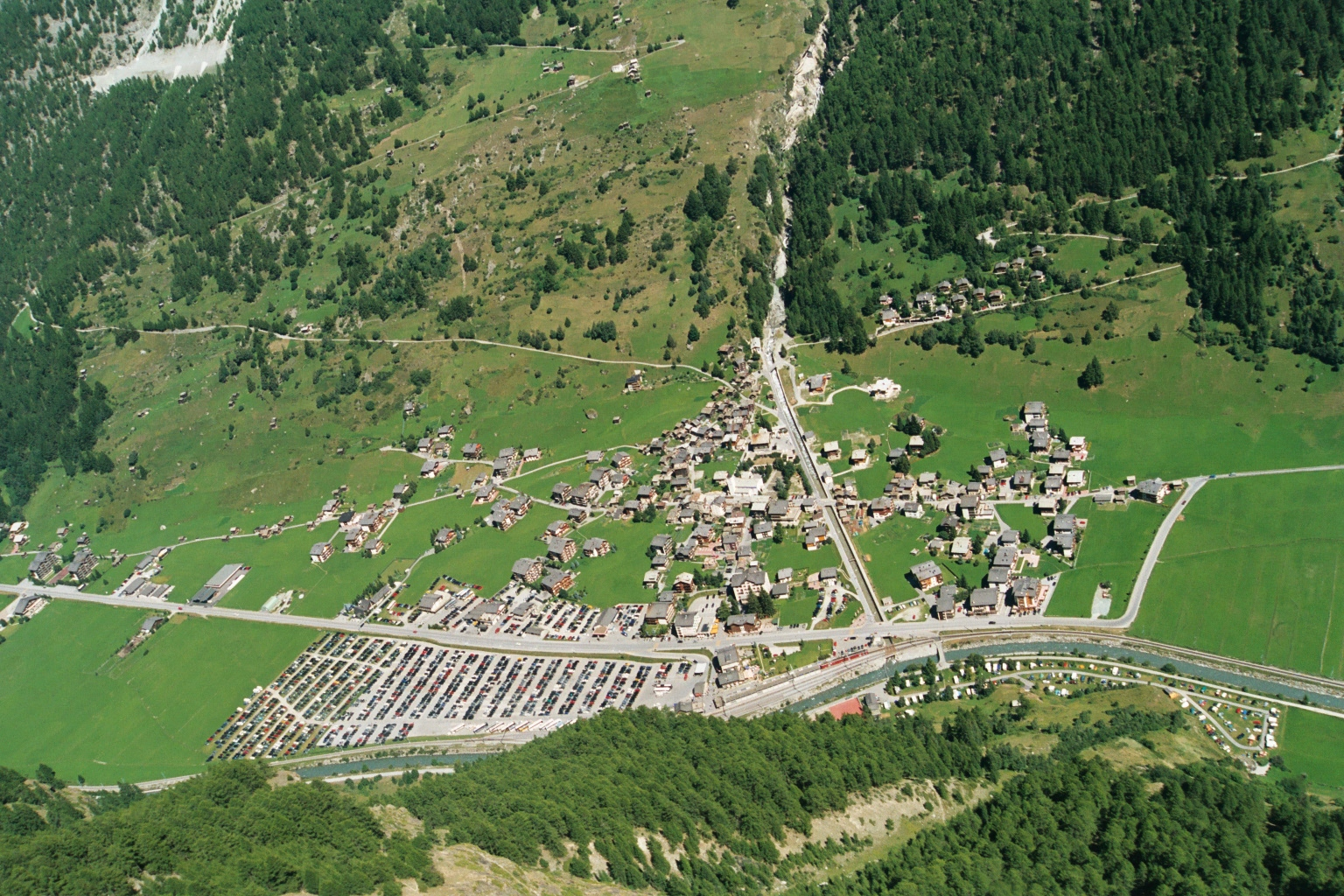
Täsch village, the car park for the Matterhorn station is visible to the left

Täsch has a population (as of December 2020) of 1,345. As of 2008, 45.8% of the population are resident foreign nationals. From 2000 to 2010, the population has changed at a rate of 27.6%. It has changed at a rate of 21% due to migration and at a rate of 4.7% due to births and deaths.

Most of the population (as of 2000) speaks German (710 or 85.4%) as their first language, Serbo-Croatian is the second most common (36 or 4.3%) and Portuguese is the third (32 or 3.9%). There are 7 people who speak French, 7 people who speak Italian and 1 person who speaks Romansh.

As of 2008, the population was 51.0% male and 49.0% female. The population was made up of 282 Swiss men (26.1% of the population) and 270 (25.0%) non-Swiss men. There were 283 Swiss women (26.2%) and 247 (22.8%) non-Swiss women. Of the population in the municipality, 435 or about 52.3% were born in Täsch and lived there in 2000. There were 137 or 16.5% who were born in the same canton, while 49 or 5.9% were born somewhere else in Switzerland, and 197 or 23.7% were born outside of Switzerland.

As of 2000, children and teenagers (0–19 years old) make up 26.1% of the population, while adults (20–64 years old) make up 63.4% and seniors (over 64 years old) make up 10.5%.

As of 2000, there were 393 people who were single and never married in the municipality. There were 368 married individuals, 40 widows or widowers and 30 individuals who are divorced.

As of 2000, there were 310 private households in the municipality, and an average of 2.6 persons per household. There were 83 households that consist of only one person and 22 households with five or more people. In 2000, a total of 288 apartments (51.7% of the total) were permanently occupied, while 258 apartments (46.3%) were seasonally occupied and 11 apartments (2.0%) were empty. As of 2009, the construction rate of new housing units was 16.6 new units per 1000 residents.

The historical population is given in the following chart:

== Politics ==
In the 2007 federal election the most popular party was the CVP which received 53.42% of the vote. The next three most popular parties were the SVP (25.74%), the SP (18.84%) and the Green Party (0.9%). In the federal election, a total of 229 votes were cast, and the voter turnout was 48.9%.

In the 2009 Conseil d'État/Staatsrat election a total of 229 votes were cast, of which 15 or about 6.6% were invalid. The voter participation was 48.1%, which is much less than the cantonal average of 54.67%. In the 2007 Swiss Council of States election a total of 229 votes were cast, of which 5 or about 2.2% were invalid. The voter participation was 49.3%, which is much less than the cantonal average of 59.88%.

== Economy ==
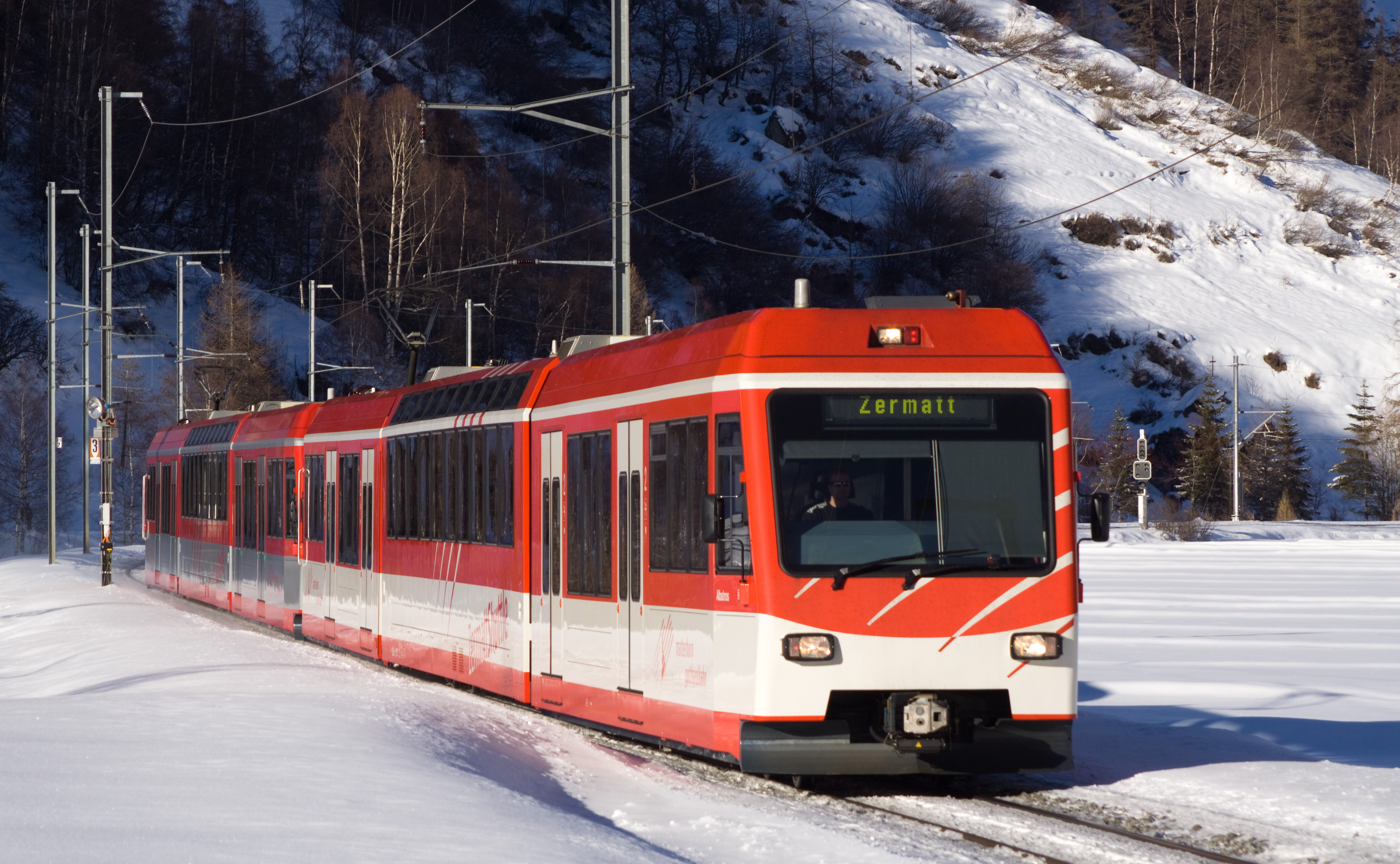
The Zermatt train. Much of the economy of Täsch is based around tourism

As of 2010, Täsch had an unemployment rate of 6.2%. As of 2008, there were 13 people employed in the primary economic sector and about 8 businesses involved in this sector. 18 people were employed in the secondary sector and there were 5 businesses in this sector. 214 people were employed in the tertiary sector, with 35 businesses in this sector. There were 449 residents of the municipality who were employed in some capacity, of which females made up 41.6% of the workforce.

In 2008 the total number of full-time equivalent jobs was 198. The number of jobs in the primary sector was 5, all of which were in agriculture. The number of jobs in the secondary sector was 17 of which 5 or (29.4%) were in manufacturing and 12 (70.6%) were in construction. The number of jobs in the tertiary sector was 176. In the tertiary sector; 22 or 12.5% were in wholesale or retail sales or the repair of motor vehicles, 48 or 27.3% were in the movement and storage of goods, 71 or 40.3% were in a hotel or restaurant, 1 was in the information industry, 2 or 1.1% were the insurance or financial industry, 1 was a technical professional or scientist, 5 or 2.8% were in education and 22 or 12.5% were in health care.

In 2000, there were 39 workers who commuted into the municipality and 315 workers who commuted away. The municipality is a net exporter of workers, with about 8.1 workers leaving the municipality for every one entering. Of the working population, 49.4% used public transportation to get to work, and 26.9% used a private car.

== Religion ==
From the 2000 census, 709 or 85.3% were Roman Catholic, while 18 or 2.2% belonged to the Swiss Reformed Church. Of the rest of the population, there were 8 members of an Orthodox church (or about 0.96% of the population), there were 2 individuals (or about 0.24% of the population) who belonged to the Christian Catholic Church, and there were 10 individuals (or about 1.20% of the population) who belonged to another Christian church. There were 50 (or about 6.02% of the population) who were Islamic. There were 2 individuals who were Buddhist. 16 (or about 1.93% of the population) belonged to no church, are agnostic or atheist, and 21 individuals (or about 2.53% of the population) did not answer the question.

== Education ==
In Täsch about 255 or (30.7%) of the population have completed non-mandatory upper secondary education, and 41 or (4.9%) have completed additional higher education (either university or a Fachhochschule). Of the 41 who completed tertiary schooling, 56.1% were Swiss men, 22.0% were Swiss women, 12.2% were non-Swiss men.

As of 2000, there was one student in Täsch who came from another municipality, while 31 residents attended schools outside the municipality.
