= Fee Glacier =

Glacier in Switzerland

- Feegletscher
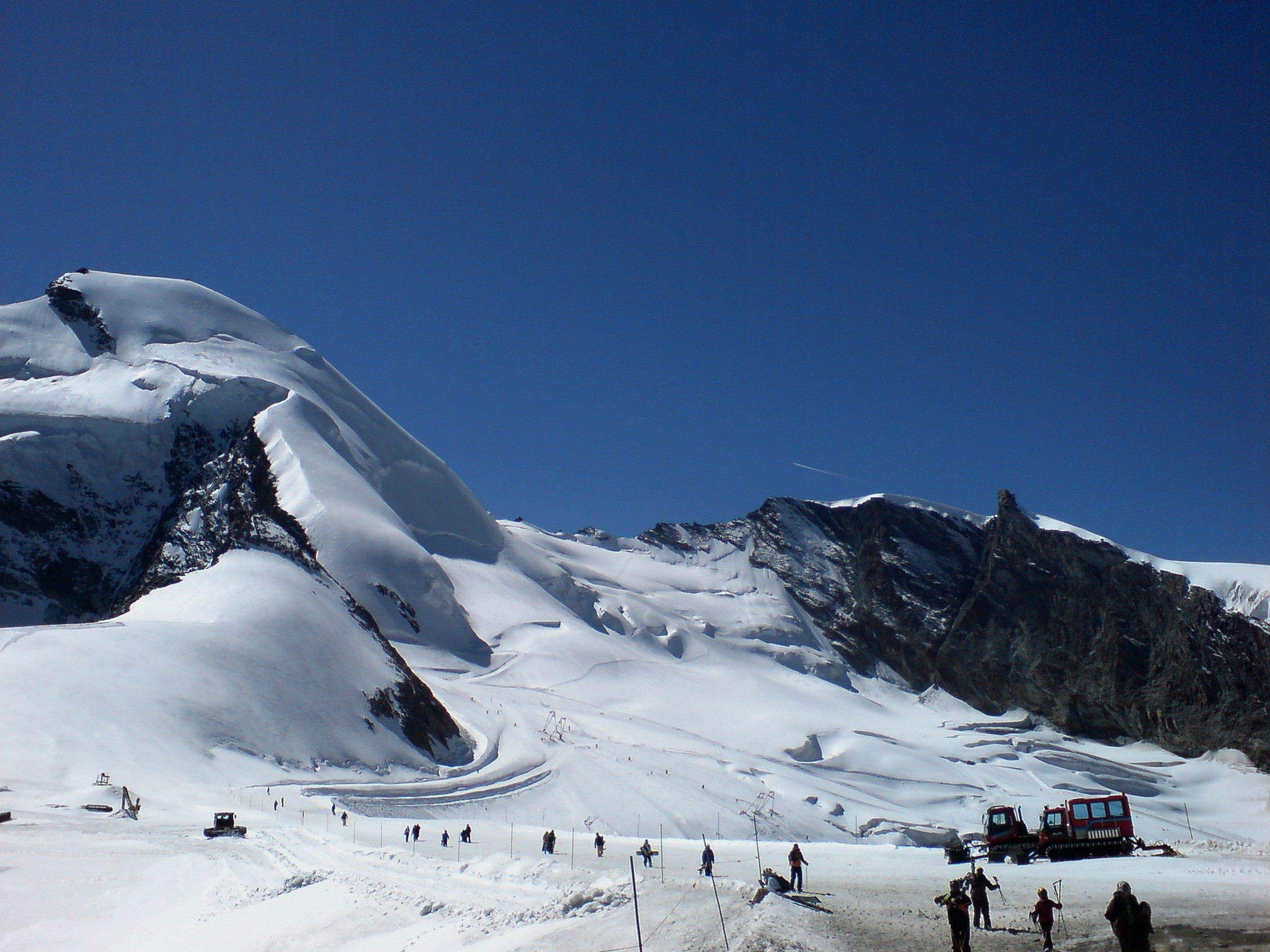
- Summer ski area in Mittelallalin
- Interactive map of Fee Glacier
- Location: Valais, Switzerland
- Coordinates: 46°3′49″N 7°53′50″E
- Length: 4.7 km

The Fee Glacier (German: Feegletscher) is a 4.7 km (2.9 mi) long glacier (2005) situated in the Pennine Alps in the canton of Valais in Switzerland. In 1973, it had a length of 5.0 km (3.1 mi) and an area of 7.5 km^{2} (2.9 sq mi). It lies east of the Mischabel range, between the summit of Dom on the north and Allalinhorn on the south. The glacier is accessible via the Mittelallalin cable car and is used as a ski area.

== Physical characteristics ==
Fee Glacier (German: Feegletscher) descends on the north-east flank of the Mischabel range, splitting into Feegletscher Nord and Süd above the resort of Saas-Fee. Glacier Monitoring of Switzerland (GLAMOS) length surveys show that the glacier measured roughly 4.6 km in 2019 and has retreated by about 1,100 m since systematic observations began in 1883, equivalent to one quarter of its 19th-century extent. The monitoring network also records a strongly negative specific-mass trend since the late 1980s, with ice-thickness losses commonly exceeding 1 m w.e. a year during the extreme summers of 2022–24.

== Geomorphology ==
During the Little Ice Age the glacier over-rode a prehistoric rock-avalanche deposit known as the Guglen slide. Detailed sediment mapping of the Feegletscher Nord foreland shows a tongue of unsorted avalanche boulders partly re-worked into an arcuate end-moraine and hummocky debris zone as the advancing ice bulldozed coarse talus downslope. Clast-fabric analysis and grain-size data confirm a mosaic of paraglacial and subglacial processes: pulverised bedrock and muddy, poorly-sorted sandy gravels sit side-by-side with subglacially sheared tills, demonstrating how a single glacier advance can redistribute millions of cubic metres of pre-existing collapse material across the valley floor.

== Economy and tourism ==
Part of the Saas-Fee lift system rises to Mittelallalin (3,500 m), where 20 km of pistes on the upper Fee Glacier still permit summer glacier skiing. According to a 2024 sustainability study, Saas-Fee and Zermatt are now the only Swiss resorts able to operate commercial glacier skiing through July-August, and summer training by elite race teams accounts for up to half of Saas-Fee's warm-season cable-car income. Operators combat ablation by snow grooming and geotextile covers, yet interviewees report that deteriorating surface conditions in 2022 forced several national squads to relocate to the southern hemisphere. The study concludes that continued retreat threatens both the economic viability of summer skiing and the valley's wider four-season tourism model.

== See also ==
- List of glaciers in Switzerland
- List of glaciers
- Retreat of glaciers since 1850
- Swiss Alps
