= Allalinhorn =

Mountain in Switzerland

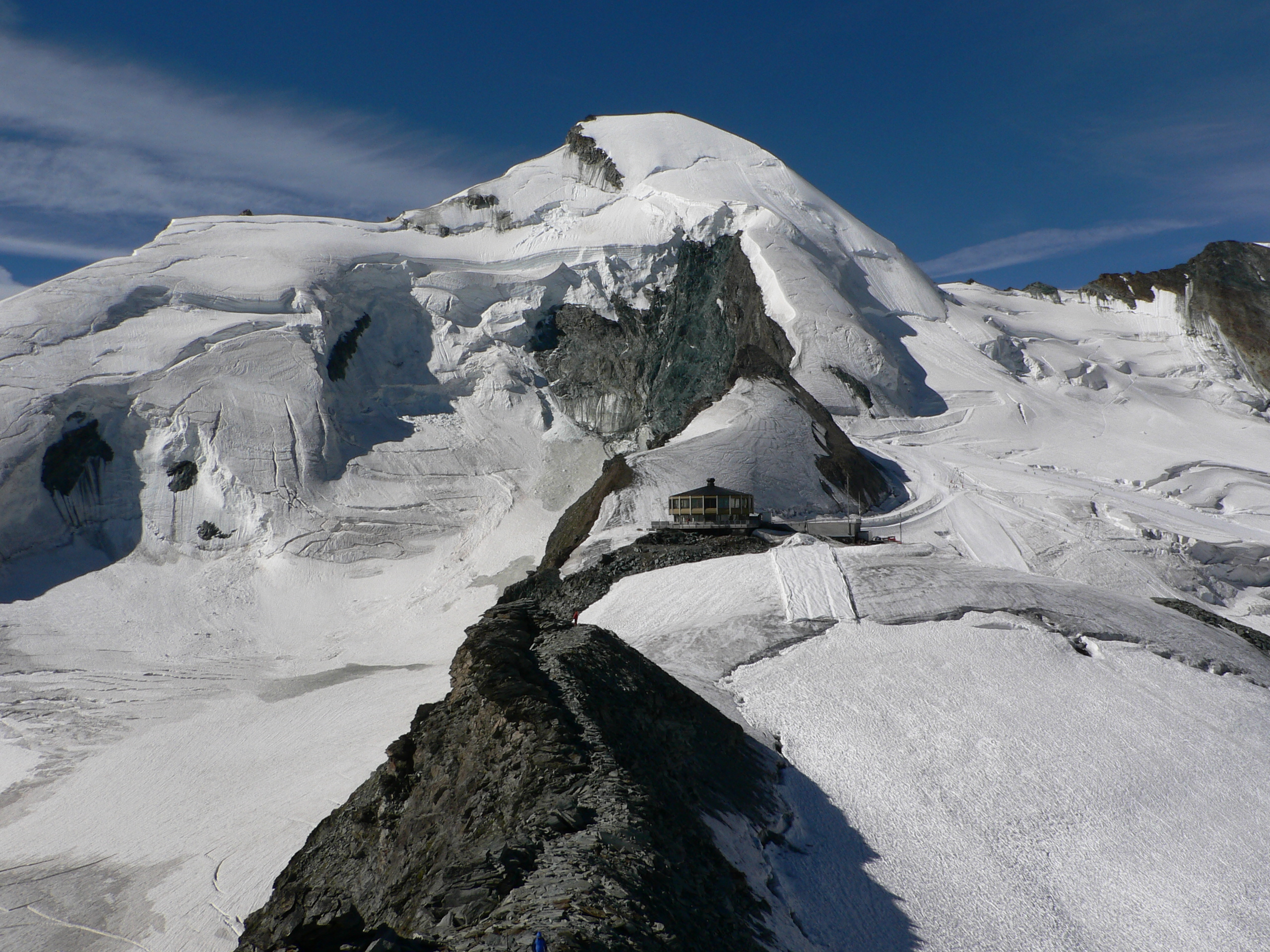
- The Allalinhorn and restaurant on Mittelallalin, in August

Highest point
- Elevation: 4,027 m (13,212 ft)
- Prominence: 257 m (843 ft)
- Parent peak: Dom
- Coordinates: 46°02′46.1″N 7°53′41.3″E

Geography
- Location within Switzerland
- Location: Valais, Switzerland
- Parent range: Pennine Alps

Climbing
- First ascent: 28 August 1856 by Edward Levi Ames, a member of the Imseng family and Franz-Josef Andenmatten
- Easiest route: North-west ridge (PD); a snow climb

The Allalinhorn (4,027 m (13,212 ft)) is a mountain in the Pennine Alps in Switzerland. It lies between Zermatt and Saas-Fee in the canton of Valais, and is part of the Mischabel range, which culminates at the Dom (4,545 m).

It was first climbed by London barrister Edward Levi Ames, a member of the Imseng family and Franz-Josef Andenmatten on 28 August 1856.

The building of the Metro Alpin funicular to the Mittelallalin (3456 m) just below the north-east face has turned the mountain into one of the easiest and popular 4000-metre peaks of the Alps, when climbed by the standard route (WNW Ridge, difficulty Grade F). On the normal route, climbers can ride up to the Mittelallalin; from there, there are only about 500 vertical metres to tackle. However, even the 'easiest' route still has objective dangers from crevasses and should not be attempted by inexperienced mountaineers without a mountain guide or adequate crevasse rescue training.

== See also ==
- List of 4000 metre peaks of the Alps
