= Randa =

Randa may refer to:

== Places ==
- Jrarrat, Kotayk, Armenia, formerly Randa
- Randa, Djibouti
- Randa, Switzerland
- Randa, Mallorca, Spain
  - Puig de Randa, a summit on Mallorca

== People ==
- Randa (rapper), New Zealand rapper
- Randa Abdel-Fattah (born 1979), Australian sociologist, writer, and lawyer
- Joe Randa, American baseball player
- Rudolph T. Randa (1940-2016), United States District Court judge
- Tomáš Randa, Czech football player

== Other uses ==
- Randa Apparel & Accessories, an American clothing company

== See also ==
- Randa rockslides of 1991 (Switzerland)
