= Volvelle =

Paper construct with rotating parts

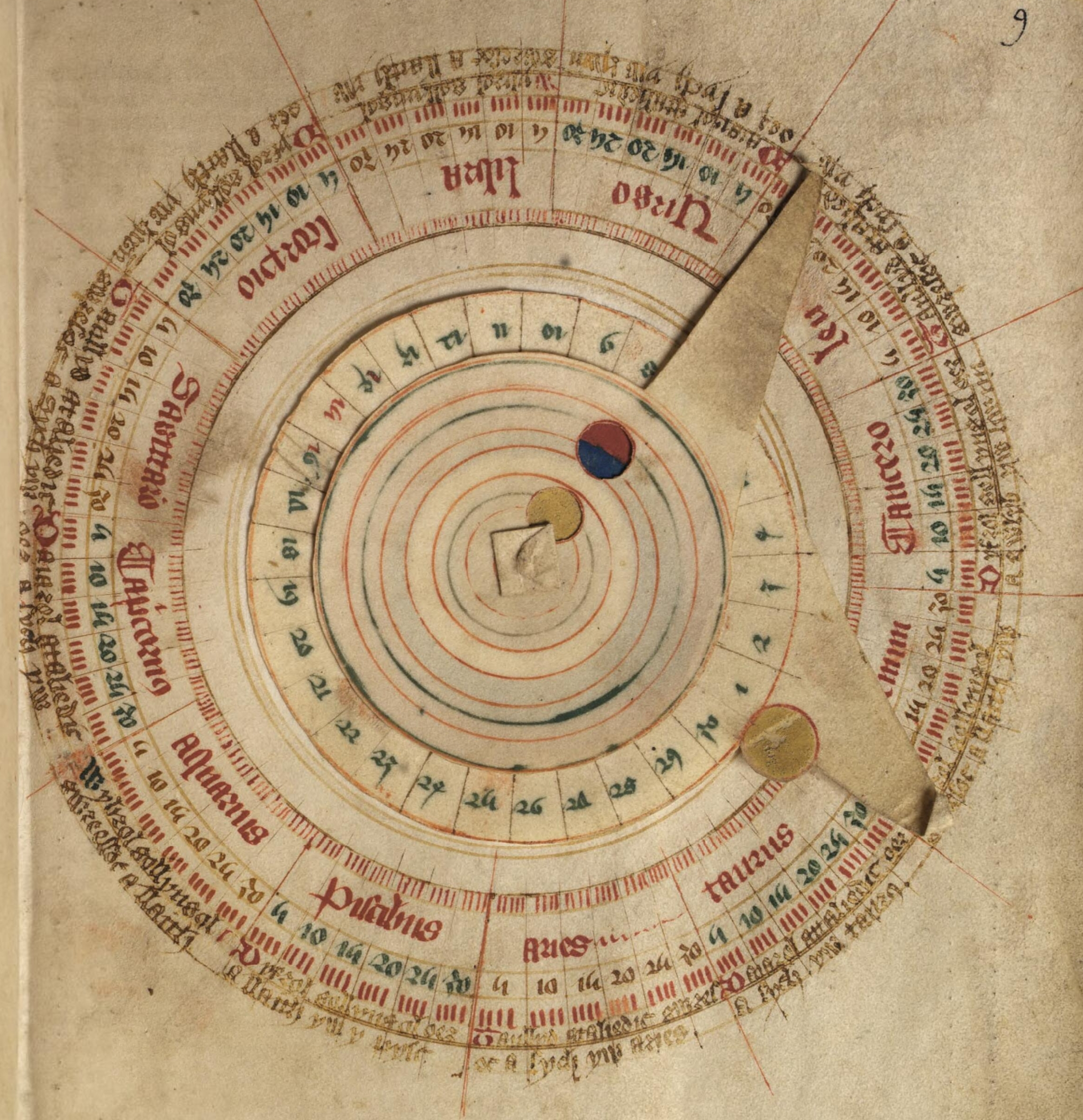
A 15th century volvella of the moon

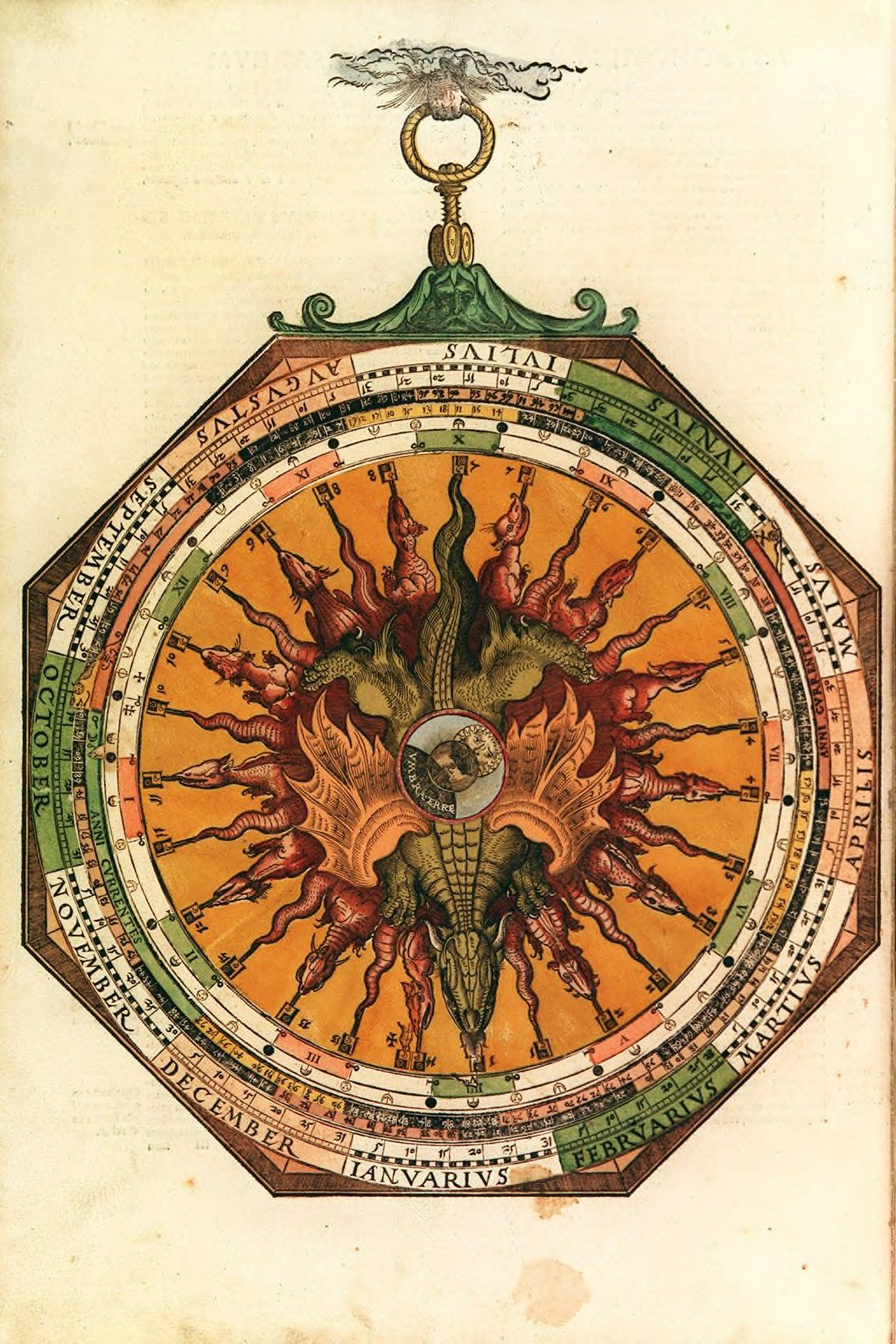
A sixteenth-century wheel chart, a page of Astronomicum Caesareum by Petrus Apianus, 1540, apparently relating to the Moon. The red dragons mark out one odd-sized and 26 equal-sized central divisions; the orbital period of the moon is 27.3 days.

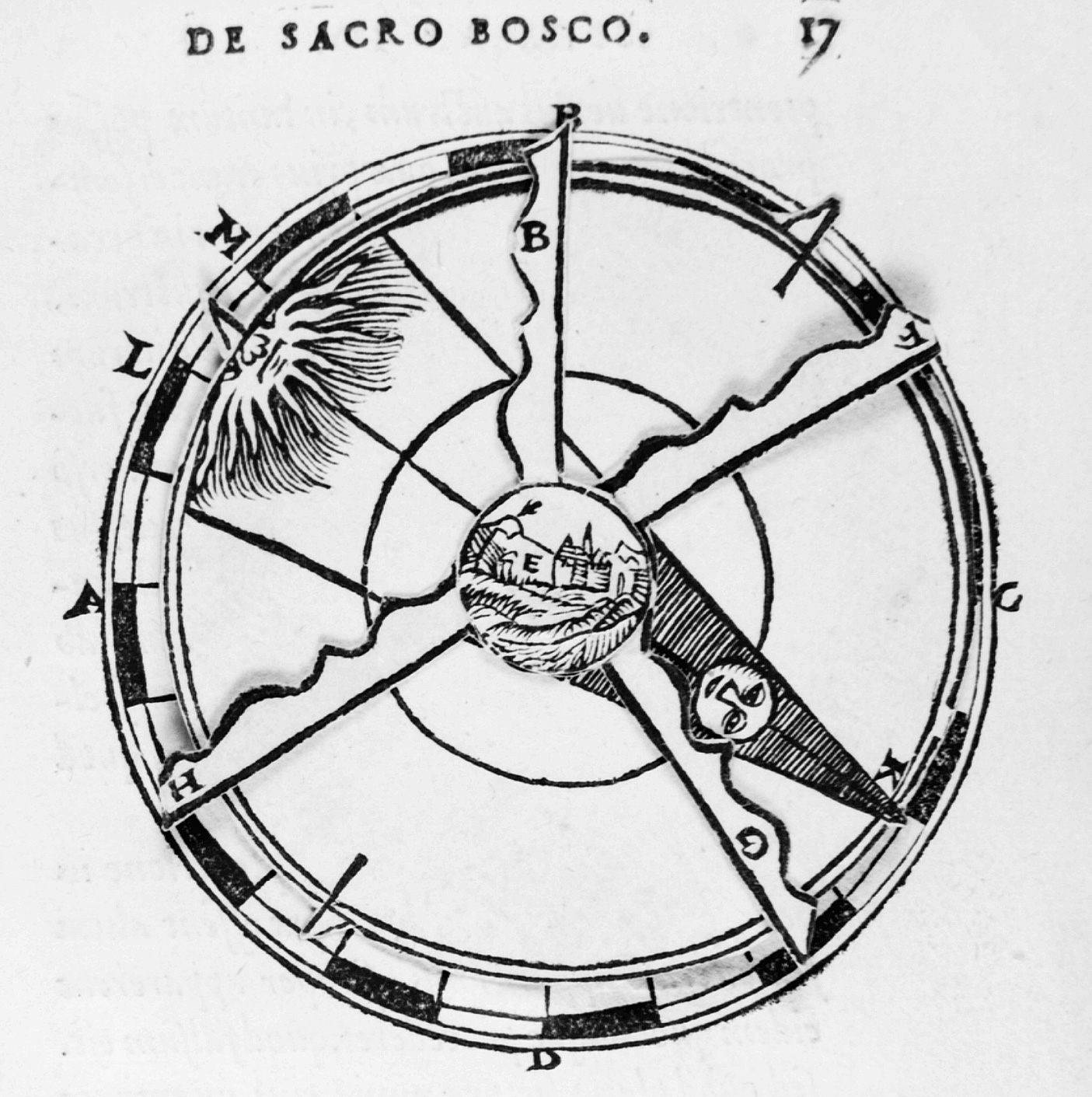
A volvelle from the sixteenth century edition of the De sphaera mundi by Johannes de Sacrobosco.

A volvelle or wheel chart is a type of slide chart, a paper construction with rotating parts. It is considered an early example of a paper analog computer. Volvelles have been produced to accommodate organization and calculation in many diverse subjects. Early examples of volvelles are found in the pages of astronomy books.

A moveable device for working out the position of the sun and moon in the zodiac is known as a volvella.

== 20th century ==
In the twentieth century, the volvelle had many diverse uses. In Reinventing the Wheel, author Jessica Helfand introduces twentieth-century volvelles with this:

The twentieth century saw a robust growth in the design, manufacture, and production of a new generation of independent, free-standing volvelles. Categorically, they not only represent an unusually eclectic set of uses, but demonstrate, too, a remarkable range of stylistic, compositional, mechanical, informational, and kinetic conceits. There are volvelles that arrange their data peripherally, centrifugally, and radially; volvelles that use multiple concentric circles with pointers; and volvelles that benefit from the generous use of the die-cut, a particular technological hallmark of modern printing manufacture. Twentieth-century volvelles—often referred to as wheel charts—offer everything from inventory control to color calibration, mileage metering to verb conjugation. They anticipate animal breeding cycles and calculate radiation exposure, measure chocolate consumption and quantify bridge tips, chart bird calls, convert metrics, and calculate taxes. There are fortune-telling wheels and semaphore-charting wheels; emergency first-aid wheels and electronic fix-it wheels; playful wheels that test phonetics and prophylactic wheels that prevent pregnancy.

The rock band Led Zeppelin employed a volvelle in the sleeve design for the album Led Zeppelin III (1970).

Two games from the game company Infocom included volvelles inside their package as "feelies": Sorcerer (1983) and A Mind Forever Voyaging (1985). Both volvelles served to impede copying of the games, because they contained information needed to play the game. Other games included similar code wheels.

== See also ==
- E6-B flight computer – Circular slide rule used in aviation
- Ramon Llull – Majorcan writer and philosopher (c. 1232 – 1316)
- Planisphere – Class of star chart
- Pop-up book – Book with moving parts, commonly directed at children
- Slide chart – Hand-held device for reference or calculation
- Zairja – Arab astrological machine
