= En Mercè-Mercè =

Catalan folktale about a prince and his horse

Folk tale
- Name: En Mercè-Mercè
- Aarne–Thompson grouping: AaTh 532, "I Don't Know" (The Helpful Horse); ATU 314, "Goldener"
- Region: Randa, Mallorca
- Published in: Aplec de rondalles mallorquines d'en Jordi des Racó, by Antoni Maria Alcover (1935)

En Mercè-Mercè is a Catalan folktale published by author Antoni Maria Alcover in the compilation Aplec de rondalles mallorquines d'en Jordi des Racó. It is classified in the international Aarne-Thompson-Uther Index as ATU 314, "Goldener". It deals with a friendship between a king's son and a magic horse that are forced to flee for their lives due to the boy's own mother, and reach another kingdom, where the boy adopts another identity.

Although it differs from variants wherein a hero acquires golden hair, its starting sequence (persecution by the hero's stepmother) is considered by scholarship as an alternate opening to the same tale type.

== Source ==
According to Alcover, the tale was provided by a source named madò Maria Sastre, from Randa, and collected in 1930.

== Summary ==
A king and a queen suffer for not having children. One day, the king leaves on a hunt and decides to kill himself with a pistol, when a woman stops him. The king reveals his worries about his childlessness, and the woman produces a large apple, to be given half to his wife and half to his best friend (meaning his mare). The king does as instructed and nine months later, a prince is born to the queen, named Bernadet, and a foal to the mare. Some time later, the king departs for war and leaves his wife and his son alone. While he is away, a Turkish king comes and has an affair with the queen, who conspire to kill prince Bernadet and his dog: first, they cook two cakes, one poisoned and the other normal to be given to the prince, lying that they were a gift from the king. Bernadet comes from school and the horse calls for him to warn about the poisoned cakes, which he is to throw to his dog. The prince follows the horse's instructions and his dog eats it and dies, then he confronts his mother and the Turkish king about their attempt on him. Later on, the horse warns Bernadet that the couple placed animals on his bed to bite and kill him, so he is to sleep in another bed.

Failing both attempts, the Turkish king and the queen deduce the horse is helping Bernadet and set their sights on it: the queen is to feign illness and ask for the horse's fat as remedy. The horse summons Bernadet and reveals the queen's new ruse, so he is to ask for one last ride on the horse, ride around the castle three times, and hold on to the horse's body for the equine will carry him to safety in another kingdom. The Turkish king approaches Bernadet and tells him of the queen's illness and the need to sacrifice the horse, so Bernadet asks for a last ride on it. The Turkish king agrees and lets the prince ride it: he dons pricely garments, saddles the horse and rides away to another kingdom.

At a safe distance, the horse gives Bernardet a tuft of its hairs with a saddlebag with a tinderbox to burn the hairs and summon it in God's name, advises him to dress in shabby clothes and find work with the local king, and only answer "Mercè, mercè", then gallops away. The prince does as instructed and assumes the identity of the lowly Mercè-Mercè, who the local king hires as a new servant to the castle. However, the other servants cannot work with him, so Merce-Merce is moved to work as assistant to the gardener, who makes bouquets for the princesses and is paid pesetas for it, while Merce-Merce drives the water wheel on a mule.

One day, when the gardener is absent, the prince summons his horse and asks for bouquets for the princesses. The horse tells him to don his princely clothes, ride around the garden along the flowers and sing a song. He does exactly that, and the youngest princess watches the event from her window, admiring and falling in love with the gardener's assistant. Merce-Merce helps the gardener prepare bouquets for the princesses, delivers them and is paid handsomely by the princesses, then gives the gardener the money.

In time, the king decides to marry his three daughters and orders three golden pears made for them, so that they throw the fruits to their suitors of choice from an assemblage of noble suitors who are to pass in front of the castle. The elder two throws theirs to noble men, while the cadette withholds hers. The king questions the princess and she says none of the rich young men were to her liking, so he is to issue another decree for man of every rank and file to pass by her window. The king agrees, and a litany of men pass by her window; when she spots Merce-Merce, she throws him the pear, representing her choice. The king gives Merce-Merce a key for the boy to live in the castle, while he goes to deal with the princess later.

Some time later, war breaks out, and the king and his two sons-in-law are fighting in the war. The gardener sends Merce-Merce on a lame mule to help the king, and the prince summons his loyal horse, which he asks to summon a black horse as his mount and an army of riders on white horses to join him and to help the king. Merce-Merce rides into the battlefield with the magic army and helps his father-in-law to ward off the enemy army, then retreats to his lowly position. War breaks out a second time, and Merce-Merce summons his horse to ask for a white horse and an army of riders on black horses. The king and his sons-in-law return and gloat about their victory.

Later, the king becomes blind, and only water from the Bella Font can restore it. The sons-in-law depart ahead of him, and the gardener bids Merce-Merce to soon join if he wants to prove himself to the king. Merce-Merce summons his horse, which points him the way to Bella Font: throw some dust in the air and follow where the wind takes it, then walk past a sleeping giant towards a fountain, fill a bottle and return without spilling a drop. Merce-Merce rides the lame mule towards Bella Font, bottles some water, and rushes back, the giant following him. After missing the giant, Merce-Merce's mule is stuck in the mud, and his brothers-in-law meet him en route. They do not recognize Merce-Merce, who says he has the water from the Bella Font and spins a false story he caught it for his father. The brothers-in-law ask for some, and Merce-Merce barters it for the duo's golden pears. A deal is made, and the brothers-in-law return with the water and gloating they found the remedy.

The king falls ill again, this time from a confusion of mind and soul, and the doctors precribe lioness's milk as cure. The sons-in-law gallop ahead, and the gardener sends Merce-Merce after. The boy summons his horse and asks for directions of a nursing lioness: he is to ride south, enter a thick forest to find a lioness, remove a cub from its teats and fill the bottle with its milk, then rush back. It happens thus, and Merce-Merce fetches the lioness's milk, but on the road back his mule is again stuck in the mud. His brothers-in-law meet him en route, but do not recognize him, and ask for the milk. Merce-Merce makes a deal with them: the milk in exchange for branding their legs with a horseshoe. It happens thus, and the brothers-in-law bring back the milk.

Merce-Merce returns empty-handed and unlocks the room with the key the king gave him, in order to rest from an arrow wound caused by the king during the second war. By God's will, the wound seals up, and the third princess appears to him. Merce-Merce tells her to have her father summon the men in order to give the crown to those who have earned it, and he will know what to do. Later, the king issues a decree and knights and noblemen assemble at his castle, even the Turkish king. Merce-Merce doffs his lowly disguise, dons his princely clothes and rides on his horse towards the palace, to the princesses' astonishment.

The king asks the people who saved them, and Bernadet declares twice it was with his armies, then produces the arrowhead stuck in his thigh. The monarch asks again who brough the water from Bella Font, and Bernadet produces the two golden pears, proving he was the one to did it. Finally, he asks who brought the lioness's milk, and Bernadet points to his brothers-in-law, mentioning the marks on their thighs. The sons-in-law lower their trousers and show them the marks. The king makes Bernadet his heir and he explains his story: he is the son of a king whom his mother and the Turkish king tried to kill, so he fled and assumed the identity of Merce-Merce. In the crowd, his father goes to embrace his son, while his mother dies on the spot and the Turkish king tries to escape, but is captured and sentenced to be drawn and quartered. Bernadet and the third princess marry in a seven-day celebration.

== Analysis ==
=== Tale type ===
The tale was classified as Catalan type AaTh 532, No ho sé ("I Don't Know"): the hero is menaced by his mother, escapes with his talking horse and is instructed to always utter "No ho sé"; the king's sons-in-law are sent for a remedy for the king, which the hero finds and trades with them for a precious object; at the end of the tale, the hero reveals to the king he was the one who brought him the remedy, and becomes king after his father-in-law. The Spanish Folktale Catalogue, by scholars Julio Camarena and Maxime Chevalier (1995), classified it as type 532, "[EL MUCHACHO QUE A TODO RESPONDÍA <NO SÉ>]" ("The youth who always answered "I Don't Know""), as the only entry in Spain. (Note: For clarification, Camarena-Chevalier classified it as a combination of types: type 590 (the hero's traitorous mother), type 511A (persecution of boy and animal friend by boy's mother and demanding animal's organ), and type 532 (uttering only "I don't know" and helpful horse).)

The Catalan type corresponds, in the international Aarne-Thompson Index (henceforth, AaTh), as tale type AaTh 532, "I Don't Know (The Helpful Horse)". However, folklorist Stith Thompson, in his work The Folktale, doubted the existence of the story as an independent tale type, since, barring a different introduction, its main narrative becomes "the same as in the Goldener tale [tale type 314]". This prompted him to suppose the tale type was a "variety" of "Goldener".

A similar notion is shared by Greek folklorists Anna Angelopoulou, Marianthi Kapanoglou and Emmanuela Katrinaki, editors of the Greek Folktale Catalogue: although they classified the Greek variants under type 532 (Greek: Ο Μπιλμέμ), they still recognized that they should be indexed as type 314 (Greek: Ο Κασίδης), since their only difference seems to lie in the introductory episodes. The Hungarian Folktale Catalogue (MNK) also took notice of the great similarity between types 532 and 314, which difficulted a specific classification into one or the other.

Furthermore, German folklorist Hans-Jörg Uther, in his 2004 revision of the international tale type index (henceforth, ATU), subsumed type AaTh 532 under a new tale type, ATU 314, "Goldener", due to "its similar structure and content".

==== Introductory episodes ====
Scholarship notes three different opening episodes to the tale type: (1) the hero becomes a magician's servant and is forbidden to open a certain door, but he does and dips his hair in a pool of gold; (2) the hero is persecuted by his stepmother, but his loyal horse warns him and later they both flee; (3) the hero is given to the magician as payment for the magician's help with his parents' infertility problem. Folklorist Christine Goldberg, in Enzyklopädie des Märchens, related the second opening to former tale type AaTh 532, "The Helpful Horse (I Don't Know)", wherein the hero is persecuted by his stepmother and flees from home with his horse.

American folklorist Barre Toelken recognized the spread of the tale type across Northern, Eastern and Southern Europe, but identified three subtypes: one that appears in Europe (Subtype 1), wherein the protagonist becomes the servant to a magical person, finds the talking horse and discovers his benefactor's true evil nature, and acquires a golden colour on some part of his body; a second narrative (Subtype 3), found in Greece, Turkey, Caucasus, Uzbekistan and Northern India, where the protagonist is born through the use of a magical fruit; and a third one (Subtype 2). According to Toelken, this Subtype 2 is "the oldest", being found "in Southern Siberia, Iran, the Arabian countries, Mediterranean, Hungary and Poland". In this subtype, the hero (who may be a prince) and the foal are born at the same time and become friends, but their lives are at stake when the hero's mother asks for the horse's vital organ (or tries to kill the boy to hide her affair), which motivates their flight from their homeland to another kingdom.

=== Motifs ===
Professor Anna Birgitta Rooth stated that the motif of the stepmother's persecution of the hero appears in tale type 314 in variants from Slavonic, Eastern European and Near Eastern regions. She also connected this motif to part of the Cinderella cycle, in a variation involving a male hero and his cow.

==== The hero's utterance ====
According to professor Josep Antoni Grimalt, the "most characteristic" motif of type 532 involves the hero pretending he is unable to say anything other than "Do not know" or something similar, like "Mercè-mercè", in the Catalan tale. In the same vein, in Stith Thompson's 1961 revision of the international index, in type 532 the hero's helpful horse advises him to answer every question with the sentence "I don't know".

==== The suitor selection test ====
The motif of the princess throwing a pear to her suitor is indexed as motif H316, "Suitor test: apple thrown indicates princess' choice (often golden apple)". According to mythologist Yuri Berezkin and other Russian researchers, the motif is "popular" in Iran, and is also attested "in Central Europe, the Balkans, the Caucasus, the Near East, and Central Asia".

According to Turkologist Karl Reichl, types ATU 314 and ATU 502 contain this motif: the princess chooses her own husband (of lowly appearance) in a gathering of potential suitors, by giving him an object (e.g., an apple). However, he also remarks that the motif is "spread in folk literature" and may appear in other tale types.

Germanist Günter Dammann, in Enzyklopädie des Märchens, argued that Subtype 2 (see above) represented the oldest form of the Goldener narrative, since the golden apple motif in the suitor selection roughly appears in the geographic distribution of the same subtype.

==== Quest for the remedy ====
A motif that appears in tale type 314 is the hero having to find a cure for the ailing king, often the milk of a certain animal (e.g., a lioness). According to scholar Erika Taube, this motif occurs in tales from North Africa to East Asia, even among Persian- and Arabic-speaking peoples. Similarly, Hasan M. El-Shamy noted that the quest for the king's remedy appears as a subsidiary event "in the Arab-Berber culture area". In addition, Germanist Gunter Dammann, in Enzyklopädie des Märchens, noted that the motif of the quest for the remedy appeared "with relative frequency" in over half of the variants that start with the Subtype 2 opening (stepmother's persecution of hero and horse).

==== Branding the brothers-in-law ====
According to German scholars Günther Damman and Kurt Ranke, another motif that appears in tale type ATU 314 is the hero branding his brothers-in-law during their hunt. Likewise, Ranke stated that the hero's branding represented a mark of his ownership over his brothers-in-law.

Ranke located the motif in the Orient and in the Mediterranean. In the same vein, Hungarian professor Ákos Dömötör, in the notes to tale type ATU 314 in the Hungarian National Catalogue of Folktales (MNK), remarked that the motif was a "reflection of the Eastern legal custom", which also appears in the Turkic epic Alpamysh.

== Variants ==
=== Spain ===
In a Spanish language tale from informant named Ana Álvarez, from San Pedro de Alcántara, with the title El príncipe jardinero ("The Gardener Prince"), a prince wants to have a horse unlike any other, and whenever the king procures such an equine, he is without luck. In time, the gardener's mare foals a green colt. The prince sees the colt and wants it as his mount, which he asks the gardener to raise. When it grows into a horse, the prince asks the gardener to open the stables, then asks the king to let him ride it. The prince equips and saddles the horse, then gallops so fast he and the horse run away from the kingdom. The prince discovers the green horse can talk and it says it is a magic horse. The green horse takes the prince to an island, then explains a king lives with his three enchanted daughters, then advises the prince to only say "me" to disenchant the princesses. It also teaches him a command to summon it, then rides away. The prince enters the castle on the island and goes to talk to the youngest princess in rags, breaking the enchantment on the family by uttering "me". The princess introduces him to her father, who marries him to his cadette and hires him as a gardener. Later, the king falls ill, and the royal doctor prescribes the orange from the castle of Irás Y No Volverás. The king's two other sons-in-law, who married the other princesses, rush to fetch the fruit, while the prince summons his green horse to join them. The green horse takes the prince to the castle, then advises him to enter the castle, steal the orange, and go immediately back, for the castle will soon close. It happens thus, and the prince rides back home. His brothers-in-law find him on the road, and seeing the orange in his hands, they ask for it. The prince makes a deal: the orange for pieces of their ears. Next, the royal doctors prescribe lioness's milk as a second cure: the prince-gardener summons his green horse, rushes to a jungle and obtains milk from a lioness. On the road back, the prince finds his brothers-in-law, who do not recognize him, and offers the lioness's milk in exchange for the green horse branding their buttocks with its hooves. Some time later, war breaks out with a neighbouring country, and the king sends his three sons-in-law to defend the realm. The gardener-prince defeats the enemy army and steals the flag as proof of his deed. On the road, he meets his brothers-in-law and lets them have the flag, but keeps the tassles to himself. The king then gathers the kingdom for a celebratory feast, and sends for his absent cadette and her gardener husband. The gardener-prince requests the doors to be closed, and questions the king who brought him the orange and mentions the people whose ears are cut off. The king sees his sons-in-law are missing parts of their ears, which confirms the gardener's words. The prince questions who brought the lioness's milk, indicating the hoof marks on their buttocks, and who truly won the war, by showing the flag's missing tassles. The king is furious at his sons-in-law and asks the prince what should be done to them, and the prince says they should be demoted to tend the gardens. It happens thus, and the prince and his wife rule the kingdom. The tale was also classified as type AaTh 532.

== See also ==
- Adventures of a Boy
- Donotknow
- Green-Vanka
- The Prince and the Foal
- Nemtudomka
