= Book of the Dispute of Raymond the Christian and Omar the Saracen =

Philosophy, Theology

Book of the dispute of Raymond the Christian and Omar the Saracen (Latin: Liber disputationis Raimundi christiani et Homeri Saraceni) is an autobiographical work by Ramon Llull written in 1308 in Pisa. It documents the debate between the Catalan philosopher and an anonymous Muslim philosopher, whom Llull calls Homer and from whom no other information has reached us, although we can assume that his real name was Omar. Llull presents the book as the reworked transcription of the dispute over the Christian dogmas of the Trinity and the Incarnation, denied by Omar through reductio ad absurdum in the scholastic fashion and affirmed by Llull using his "a priori" demonstrative method, called demonstratio per aequiparantiam'. The book was originally written in Arabic during Llull's captivity in Bejaia (Algeria), losing it in the shipwreck that he suffered on his return to Genoa. He rewrote it in Latin while he was in Pisa, sending a copy to Pope Clement V.
