= Book of the Gentile and the Three Wise Men =

Book by Ramon Llull

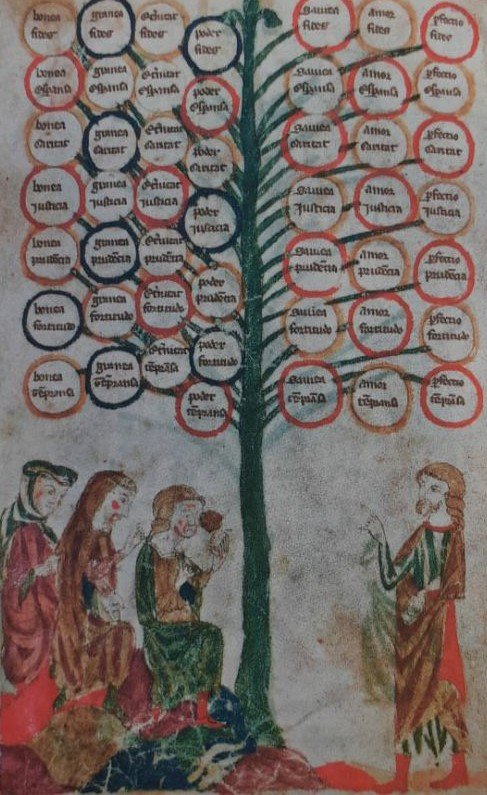
- Author: Ramon Llull
- Original title: كتاب الكافر والحكماء الثلاثة
- Language: Arabic, Catalan, Latin

The Book of the Gentile and the Three Wise Men (Arabic: كتاب الكافر والحكماء الثلاثة, Catalan: Llibre del gentil e dels tres savis) is an apologetic by Ramon Llull. It was first written in Arabic, then in Catalan and Latin.

== Content ==
The book tells of a "Gentile" (in this case a Pagan) who speaks with "three wise men," each representing one of the three main Abrahamic religions—Judaism, Christianity, and Islam. Each of these three men presents his religion, and the Gentile makes his choice. When it might be expected of a Christian polemicist such as Llull to establish the superiority of Christianity, he does not disclose the gentile's choice and leaves it as an open-ended question:

"But before the three wise men left, the Gentile asked them in astonishment why they did not wait to hear which religion he would choose in preference to the others. The three wise men answered, saying that, in order for each to be free to choose his own religion, they preferred not knowing which religion he would choose. “And all the more so since this is a question we could discuss among ourselves to see, by force of reason and by means of our intellects, which religion it must be that you will choose. And if, in front of us, you state which religion it is that you prefer, then we would not have such a good subject of discussion nor such satisfaction in discovering the truth." (1:300-301)
