= Slide chart =

Hand-held device for reference or calculation

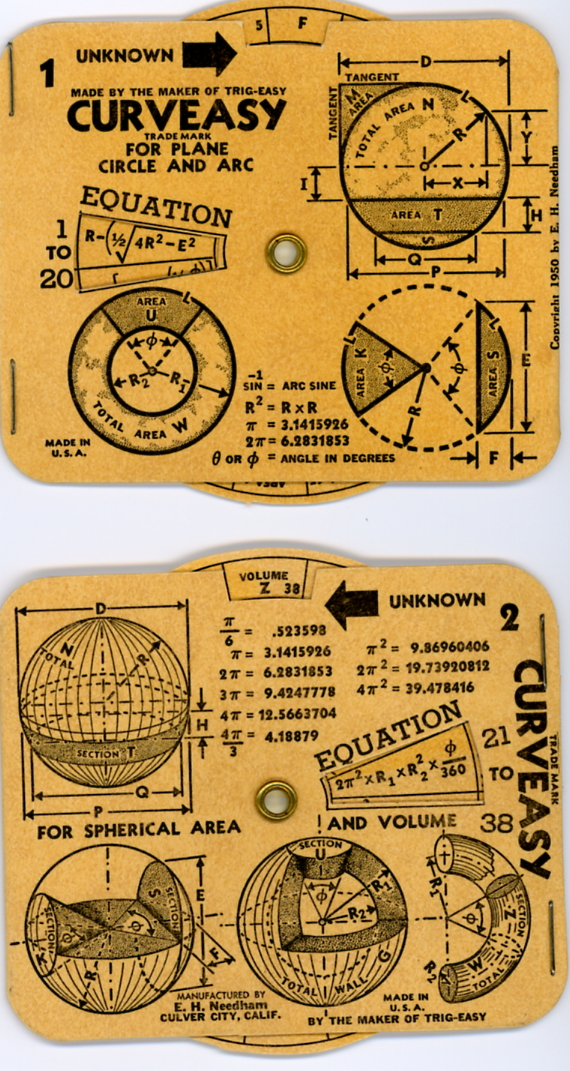
A "Curveasy" slide chart for spherical geometry calculations

A slide chart is a hand-held device, usually of paper, cardboard, or plastic, for conducting simple calculations or looking up information. A circular slide chart is sometimes referred to as a wheel chart or volvelle.

Unlike other hand-held mechanical calculating devices such as slide rules and addiators, which have been replaced by electronic calculators and computer software, wheel charts and slide charts have survived to the present time. There are a number of companies who design and manufacture these devices.

Unlike the general-purpose mechanical calculators, slide charts are typically devoted to carrying out a particular specialized calculation, or displaying information on a single product or a particular process. For example, the "Curveasy" wheel chart displays information related to spherical geometry calculations, and the Prestolog calculator is used for cost/profit calculations. Another example of a wheel chart is the planisphere, which shows the location of stars in the sky for a given location, date, and time.

Slide charts are often associated with particular sports, political campaigns or commercial companies. For example, a pharmaceutical company may create wheel charts printed with their company name and product information for distribution to medical practitioners.

Slide charts are common collectables.

== See also ==
- E6-B flight computer – Circular slide rule used in aviation
