= The Book of One Thousand Proverbs =

1302 book by Ramon Llull

The Book of One Thousand Proverbs (Llibre de mil proverbis) is a book by the polymath Ramon Llull, which contains advice, admonitions, and sayings encompassing various aspects of theology, philosophy, morality, social life, and practical life.

== Summary ==
Ramon Llull wrote these proverbs in Old Catalan in 1302 while at sea, returning from Cyprus. The collection was first published in 1746, printed in Palma de Mallorca by Miquel Cerdà and Miquel Amorós.

The proverbs are distributed across fifty-two chapters, with the amount of proverbs per chapter ranging from seventeen to twenty-two, averaging twenty. Each chapter is dedicated to a virtue or sin, a moral quality, or a human condition. The structure of the book follows a hierarchical order: About God, the Prelate, the Subordinate, the Spouse, the Friend, the Enemy, etc.

The main qualities of Llull's book are its conciseness, its didactic simplicity, and its musicality; the writing avoids the typical scholastic medieval embellishments.
