= Ramon Llull =

Majorcan writer and philosopher (c. 1232 – 1316)

Blessed Ramon Llull TOSF
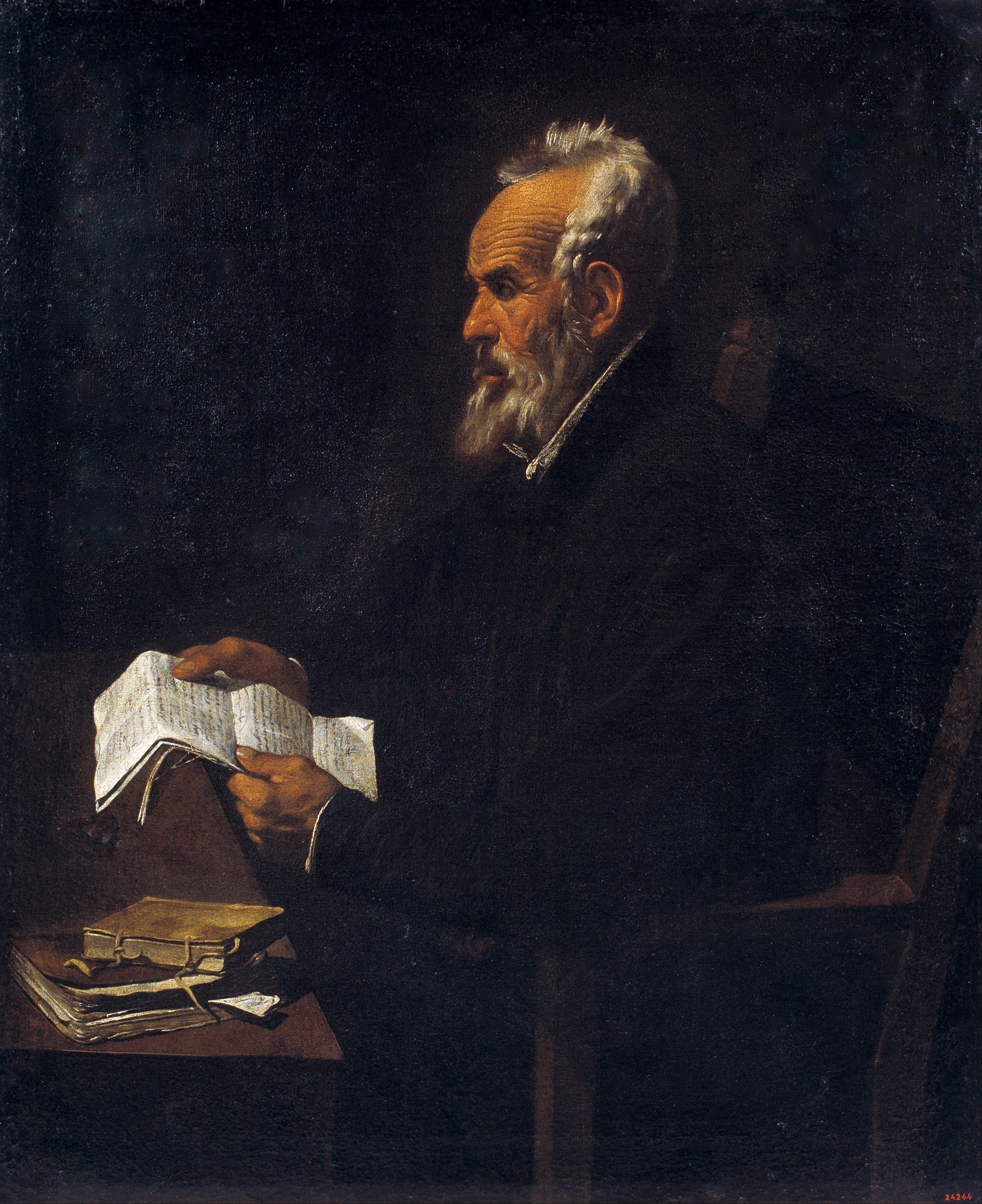
- Anachronistic portrait of Ramon Llull by Francisco Ribalta (1620)
- Born: c. 1232; Palma de Mallorca, Kingdom of Majorca
- Died: 1316 (aged 83–84)
- Venerated in: Catholic Church
- Beatified: 11 September 1847 by Pope Pius IX
- Feast: 30 June
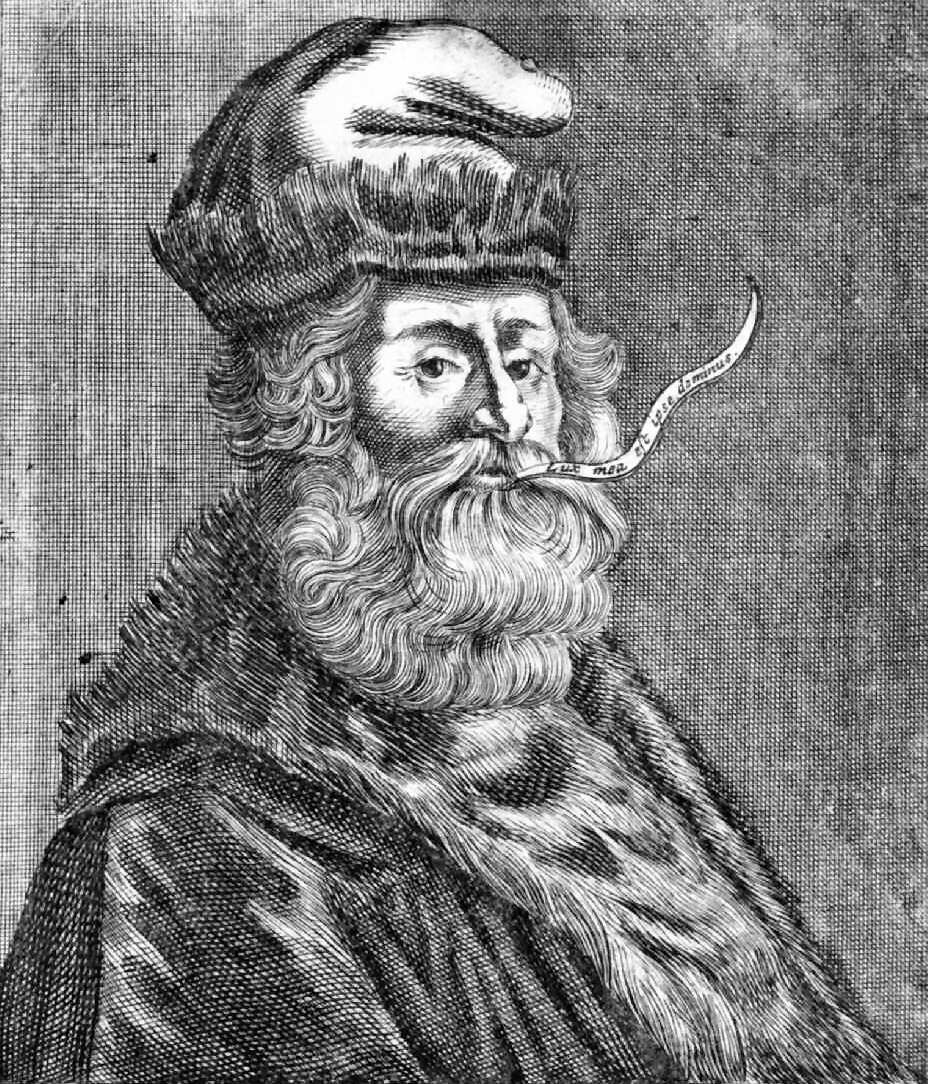
- Anachronistic image of Ramon Llull with speech scroll, by an unknown artist (16th–17th century)

Philosophical work
- Era: Medieval philosophy
- Region: Western philosophy
- School: Lullism
- Main interests: Christian theology; philosophy; logic; mathematics
- Notable works: Blanquerna; Tree of Science; Ars Magna
- Notable ideas: Lullist thought; election theory; computation theory

Ramon Llull (/lʌl/; Catalan: [rəˈmoɲ ˈʎuʎ]; c. 1232 (Note: Born 1232 per Mark D. Johnston in Routledge Encyclopedia of Philosophy (London: Routledge, 1998). Older sources (such as versions of Encyclopædia Britannica at least up to 1955) give 1235; the current Britannica gives 1232–1233.) – 1316), (Note: Variously latinized as Raimundus/Raymundus Lullus/Lulius/Lullius.) sometimes anglicized as Raymond Lully, was a Catholic philosopher, theologian, poet, missionary, apologist and former knight, born in Palma de Mallorca. He invented a philosophical system known as the Art, conceived as a type of universal logic to prove the truth of Christian doctrine to interlocutors of all faiths and nationalities. The Art consists of a set of general principles and combinatorial operations. It is illustrated with diagrams.

A prolific writer, he is also known for his literary works written in Catalan, which he composed to make his Art accessible to a wider audience. In addition to Catalan and Latin, he also probably wrote in Arabic (although no texts in Arabic survive). His books were translated into Occitan, French, and Castilian during his lifetime.

Although his work did not enjoy huge success during his lifetime, he has had a rich and continuing reception. In the early modern period his name became associated with alchemical works. More recently he has been recognized as a precursor of the modern field of social choice theory, 450 years before Borda and Condorcet's investigations reopened the field. His ideas also prefigured the development of computation theory.

Venerated as a saintly figure in the Catholic Church, he was beatified by Pope Pius IX in 1847. In several respects close to the experience of the Beguines, Ramon Llull remained a layman — a secular individual — throughout his entire life; there is no evidence that he ever joined a religious order, not even as a Franciscan tertiary, as was once believed.

== Life ==
=== Early life and family ===
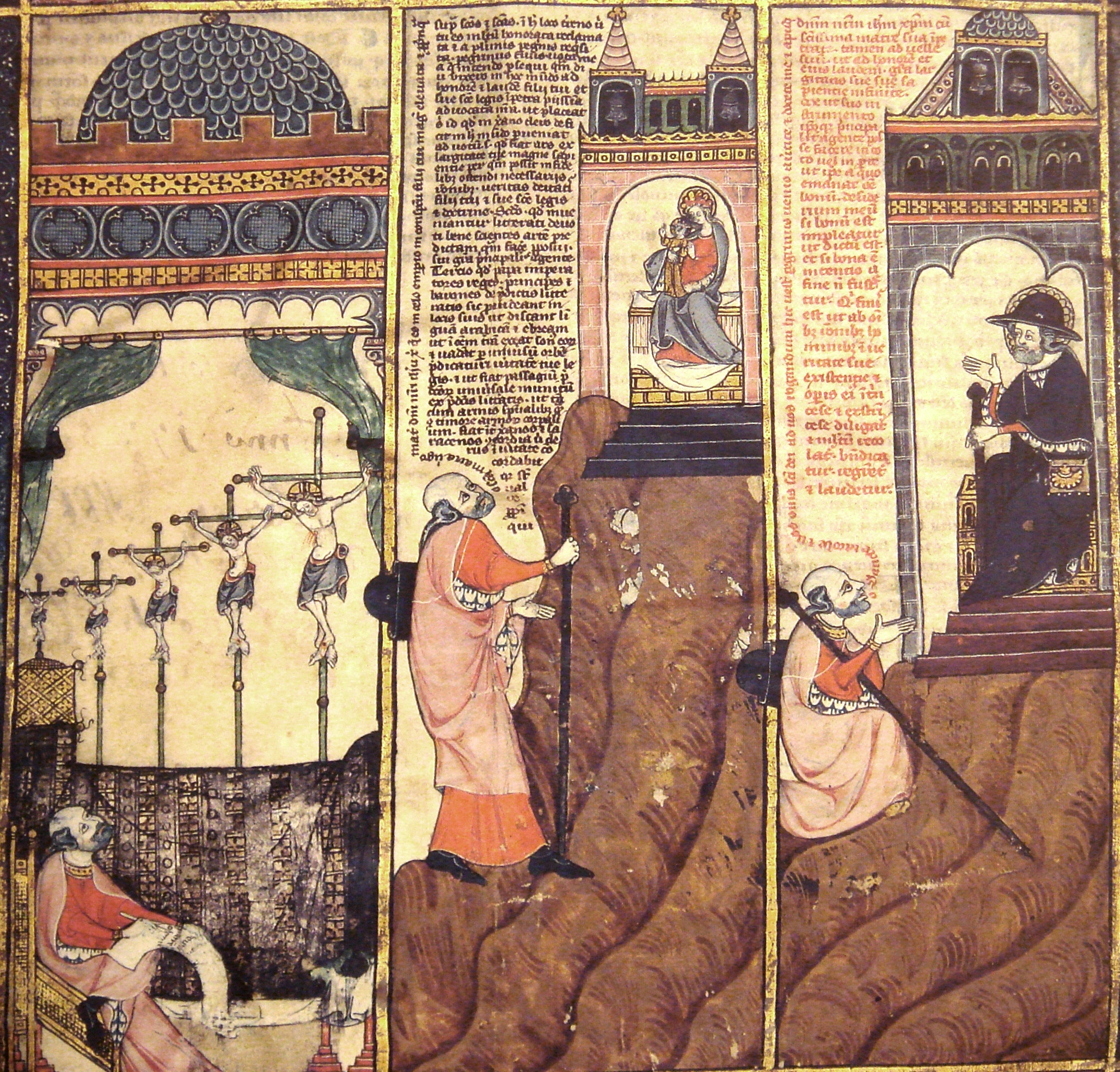
Scenes from the life of Raymond Lull, in a 14th-century manuscript

Llull was born in Palma into a wealthy family of Barcelona patricians who had come to the Kingdom of Majorca in 1229 with the conquering armies of James I of Aragon. James I had conquered the formerly Almohad-ruled Majorca as part of a larger move to integrate the territories of the Balearic Islands (now part of Spain) into the Crown of Aragon. Llull was born there a few years later, in 1232 or 1233. Muslims still constituted a large part of the population of Majorca and Jews were present in cultural and economic affairs.

In 1257 Llull married Blanca Picany, with whom he had two children, Domènec and Magdalena. Although he formed a family, he lived what he would later call the licentious and worldly life of a troubadour.

=== Religious calling ===
In 1263 Llull experienced a series of visions. He narrates the event in his autobiography Vita coaetanea ("A Contemporary Life"):

Ramon, while still a young man and Seneschal to the King of Majorca, was very given to composing worthless songs and poems and to doing other licentious things. One night he was sitting beside his bed, about to compose and write in his vulgar tongue a song to a lady whom he loved with a foolish love; and as he began to write this song, he looked to his right and saw our Lord Jesus Christ on the Cross, as if suspended in mid-air.

The vision came to Llull five times in all and inspired in him three intentions: to give up his soul for the sake of God's love and honor, to convert the Saracens (i.e., Arabs and/or Muslims) to Christianity, and write the best book in the world against the errors of the unbelievers.

Following his visions he sold his possessions on the model of Saint Francis of Assisi and set out on pilgrimages to the shrines of Saint Mary of Rocamadour, Saint James, and other places, never to come back to his family and profession. When he returned to Majorca he purchased a Muslim slave in order to learn Arabic from him. For the next nine years, until 1274, he engaged in study and contemplation in relative solitude. He read extensively in both Latin and Arabic, learning both Christian and Muslim theological and philosophical thought.

In 1270 Llull founded the hermitage of the Holy Trinity in Mallorca, known as Miramar.

Between 1271 and 1274 Llull wrote his first works, a compendium of the Muslim thinker Al-Ghazali's logic and the Llibre de contemplació en Déu (Book on the Contemplation of God), a lengthy guide to finding truth through contemplation.

In 1274, while staying at a hermitage on Puig de Randa, the form of the great book Llull was to write was finally given to him through divine revelation: a complex system that he named his Art, which would become the motivation behind most of his life's efforts.

=== Missionary work and education ===
Llull urged the study of Arabic and other languages in Europe, in order to convert Muslims and schismatic Christians. He travelled through Europe to meet popes, kings, and princes, trying to establish special colleges to prepare future missionaries. In 1276 a language school for Franciscan missionaries was founded at Miramar, funded by the King of Majorca.

About 1291 he went to Tunis, preached to the Saracens, disputed with them in philosophy, and after another brief sojourn in Paris, returned to the East as a missionary. Llull travelled to Tunis a second time in about 1304, and wrote numerous letters to the king of Tunis, but little else is known about this part of his life.

He returned in 1308, reporting that the conversion of Muslims should be achieved through prayer, not through military force. He finally achieved his goal of linguistic education at major universities in 1311 when the Council of Vienne ordered the creation of chairs of Hebrew, Arabic and Chaldean (Aramaic) at the universities of Bologna, Oxford, Paris, and Salamanca as well as at the Papal Court.

=== Death ===
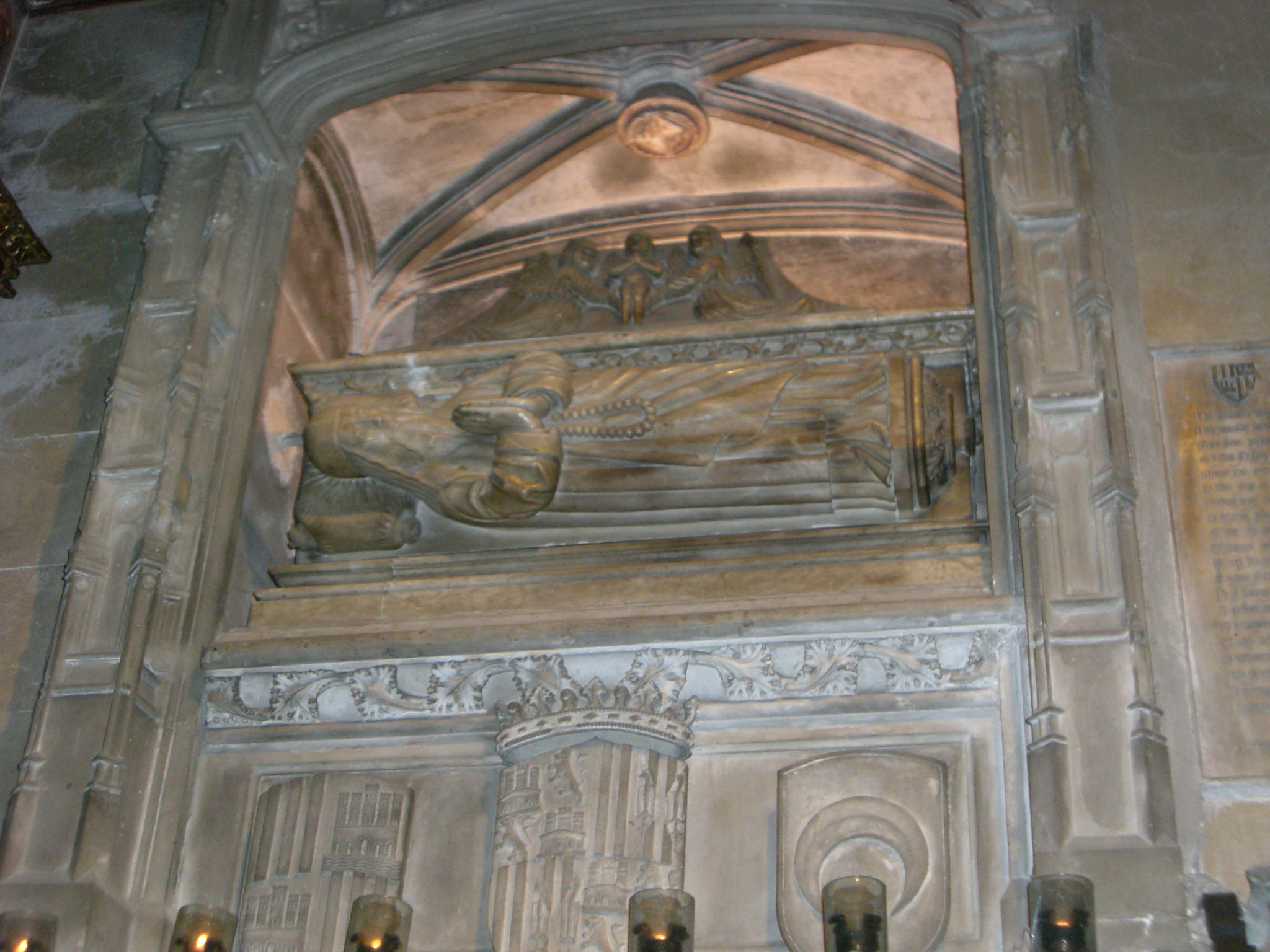
Llull's tomb in Palma

In 1314, at the age of 82, Llull traveled again to Tunis, possibly prompted by the correspondence between King James II of Aragon and al-Lihyani, the Hafsid caliph, indicating that the caliph wished to convert to Christianity. Whereas Llull had been met with difficulties during his previous visits to North Africa, he was allowed to operate this time without interference from the authorities due to the improved relations between Tunis and Aragon.

Later on, in 1315, he was stoned by an angry mob in Bougie or Tunis. Although there was a tradition that he died as a result, and thus is venerated as a martyr, there is now evidence that he was rescued by local Christians and died early the next year, either on board ship returning home to Mallorca, or shortly after his arrival there. Llull's tomb, created in 1448, is in the Franciscan church in Palma de Mallorca. His last work is dated December 1315 in Tunis.

== Veneration ==
Venerated as a saintly figure, Llull was officially considered for canonization after his death. He was beatified on 11 September 1847 by Pope Pius IX.

== Works ==
=== Llull's Art ===
Llull's Art (in Latin Ars) is at the center of his thought and undergirds his entire corpus. It is a system of universal logic based on a set of general principles activated in a combinatorial process. Its intent is to prove statements about God and creation (e.g., "God is a Trinity"). Often the Art formulates these statements as questions and answers (e.g., Q: "Is there a Trinity in God?" A: "Yes"). It works cumulatively through an iterative process; statements about God's nature must be proved for each of God's essential attributes in order to prove the statement true for God (i.e., Goodness is threefold, Greatness is threefold, Eternity is threefold, Power is threefold, etc.).

What sets Llull's system apart is its unusual use of letters and diagrams, giving it an algebraic or algorithmic character. He developed the Art over the course of many decades, writing new books to explain each new version. The Art's trajectory can be divided into two main phases, although each phase contains numerous variations. The first is sometimes called the Quaternary Phase (1274–1290) and the second the Ternary Phase (1290–1308). This terminology was coined by Anthony Bonner.

==== Quaternary Phase ====
The two main works of the Quaternary Phase are Ars compendiosa inveniendi veritatem (c. 1274) and Ars demonstrativa (c. 1283). The Ars demonstrativa has 12 main figures. A set of 16 principles, or "dignities" (divine attributes) comprise the general foundation for the system's operation. These principles are displayed in the first figure (Figure A) and assigned letters (B through R). The rest of the figures are intended to enable the user to combine these principles to demonstrate the truth of statements. Figure T, for instance, contains "relative principles" (e.g., minority, majority, equality, etc.), also assigned letters. Figure S displays the Augustinian powers of the soul (will, intellect, and memory) and their acts (willing, understanding, and remembering).

==== Ternary Phase ====
Llull inaugurated the Ternary Phase with two works written in 1290: Ars inventiva veritatis and Ars amativa (or Ars amativa boni). The culmination of this phase came in 1308 with a finalized version of the Art called Ars generalis ultima. In the same year, Llull wrote an abbreviated version called the Ars brevis. In these works, Llull revised the Art to have only four main figures. He reduced the number of divine principles in the first figure to nine (goodness, greatness, eternity, power, wisdom, will, virtue, truth, glory). Figure T also now has nine relational principles (difference, concordance, contrariety, beginning, middle, end, majority, equality, and minority), reduced from 15. Llull kept the combinatorial aspect of the process.

==== Correlatives ====
Llull introduced an aspect of the system called the "correlatives" just before the final transition to the Ternary Phase. The correlatives first appear in a work called the Lectura super figuras Artis demonstrativae (c. 1285–1287) and came to undergird his formulation of the nature of being. The doctrine of correlatives stipulates that everything, at the level of being, has a threefold structure: agent, patient, and act. For example, the divine principle "goodness" consists of "that which does good" (agent), "that which receives good" (patient), and "to do good" (act). Llull used a system of Latin suffixes to express the correlatives, e.g. for bonitas (goodness): bonificans, bonificatus, and bonificare, respectively. This became his basis for attempting to prove that the divine principles are distinct yet equivalent in God (each principle has the same underlying threefold structure, yet retains its own unique correlatives). This supports the combinatorial operation of the Art; for example, in God, goodness is greatness and greatness is goodness, goodness is eternity and eternity is goodness, etc. It is also the basis of the Lullian approach to proof of the Trinity (each divine principle has the three correlatives, and together the principles comprise the Godhead; therefore, the Godhead is threefold), and proof of the Incarnation (the active and passive correlatives are equivalent to matter and form, and the trinitarian unfolding of being occurs on all levels of reality).

Within this framework, Liber Chaos – a section of the Lectura – explores the concept of primordial chaos as the initial state of creation, whereat divine principles had yet to impose order upon formless potential. Llull's treatment of chaos aligns with his system of correlatives, suggesting that chaos itself contains within it the active force of divine causation, the passive potential of undifferentiated being, and the act of transformation by which it becomes structured reality. This concept – though philosophical, in Llull's system – bears a striking resemblance to alchemical notions of prima materia, the raw substance from which all transmutations were said to arise.

=== Other works ===
==== Influence of Islam and early works ====
It has been pointed out that the Art's combinatorial mechanics bear a resemblance to zairja, a device used by medieval Arab astrologers. The Art's reliance on divine attributes also has a certain similarity to the contemplation of the ninety-nine Names of God in the Muslim tradition. Llull's familiarity with the Islamic intellectual tradition is evidenced by the fact that his first work (1271–72) was a compendium of Al-Ghazali's logic.

==== Dialogues ====
From early in his career Llull composed dialogues to enact the procedure of the Art. This is linked to the missionary aspect of the Art; Llull conceived of it as an instrument to convert all peoples of the world to Christianity, and experimented with more popular genres to make it easier to understand. His earliest and most well-known dialogue is the Book of the Gentile and the Three Wise Men, written in Catalan in the 1270s and later translated into Latin. It is framed as a meeting of three wise men (a Muslim, a Jew, and a Christian) and a Gentile in the woods. They learn about the Lullian method when they encounter a set of trees with leaves inscribed with Lullian principles. Lady Intelligence appears and informs them of the properties of the trees and the rules for implementing the leaves. The wise men use the trees to prove their respective Articles of Faith to the Gentile (although some of the Islamic tenets cannot be proved with the Lullian procedure), and in the end the Gentile is converted to Christianity.

Llull subsequently composed many other dialogues. Later in his career, when he became concerned with heretical activity in the Arts Faculty of the University of Paris, he wrote "disputations" with philosophers as interlocutors. He also created a character for himself, and he stars in many of these dialogues as the Christian wise man (for instance: Liber de quaestione valde alta et profunda, composed in 1311).

==== Tree diagrams ====
Llull structured many of his works around trees. In some, like the Book of the Gentile and the Three Wise Men, the "leaves" of the trees stand for the combinatorial elements (principles) of the Art. In other works a series of trees shows how the Art generates all ("encyclopedic") knowledge. The Tree of Science (1295–96) comprises sixteen trees ranging from earthly and moral to divine and pedagogical. Each tree is divided into seven parts (roots, trunk, branches, twigs, leaves, flowers, fruits). The roots always consist of the Lullian divine principles and from there the tree grows into the differentiated aspects of its respective category of reality.

==== Proverbs ====
Llull wrote several books of proverbs in Catalan, to make it easier for local people to read. The Book of One Thousand Proverbs, written in 1302, compiled maxims that encompassed various fields: theology, philosophy, morality, social life, and practical life. The main virtues noted of Llull's proverbs are concision, didactic simplicity, and musicality.

==== Novels ====
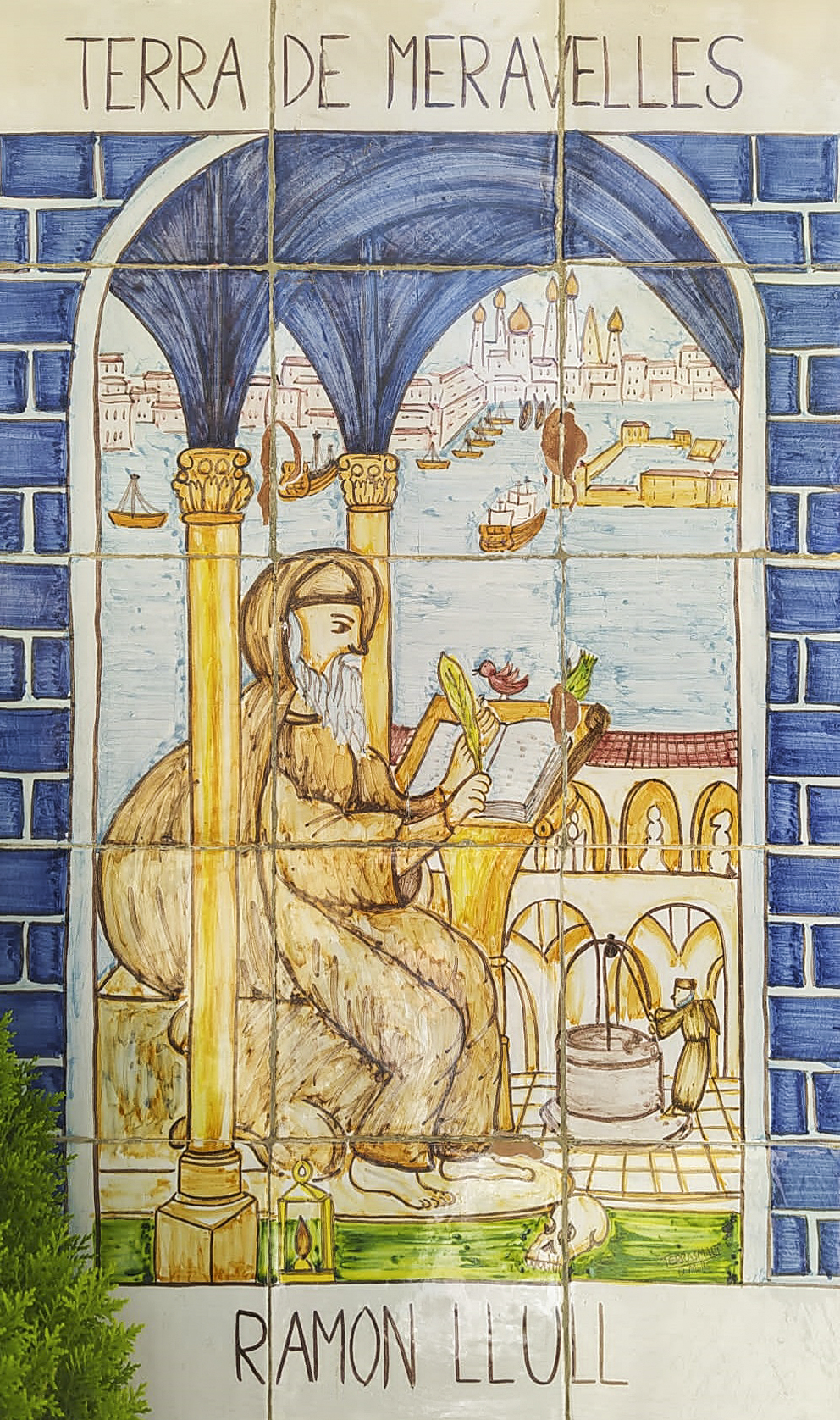
Ceramic ceiling light in the Sanctuary of Cura, Puig de Randa

Llull also wrote narrative prose drawing on the literary traditions of his time (epic, romance) to express the Art. These works were intended to communicate the potentially complex operations of the Art to a lay audience. Blanquerna (c. 1276–1283) is the best known of his novels; Felix (1287–1289) is also notable, though it was not widely circulated during his lifetime and was only available in Catalan. It is a Bildungsroman, of sorts, in which the titular protagonist sets out on a journey at the instigation of his father, who has written a "Book of Wonders". The book is divided into ten chapters—echoing the encyclopedic range of the Tree of Science—as Felix gains knowledge of God, angels, heavens, elements, plants, minerals, animals, man, Paradise, and Hell. Felix's journey ends at a monastery, where he relates the "Book of Wonders"—now embellished and fused with the account of his own adventures.

== Reception ==
=== Medieval ===
==== Academic theology ====
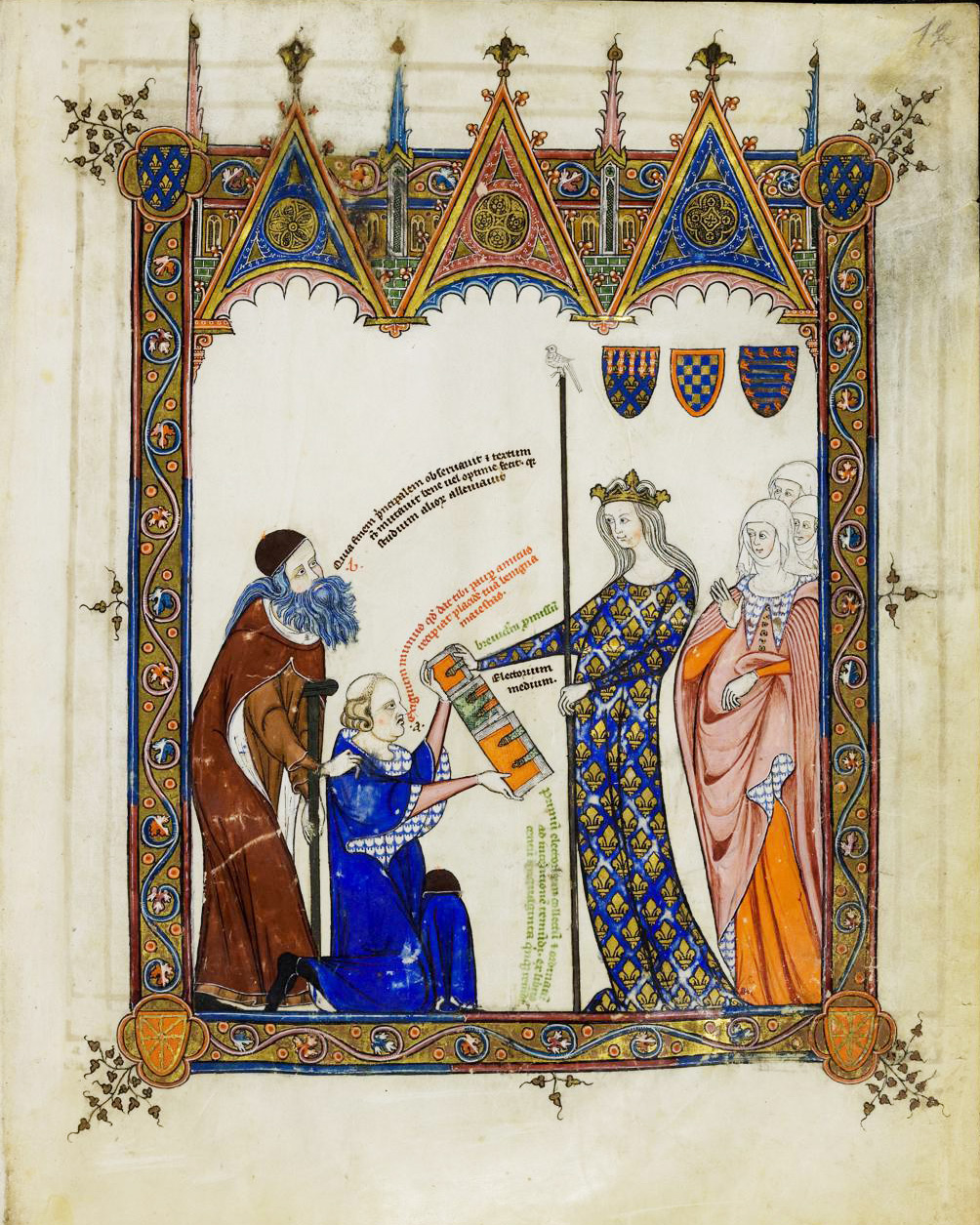
Ramon Llull, with his disciple Thomas Le Myésier, presenting three anthologies to the queen

According to Llull's autobiographical Vita, his Art was not received well at the University of Paris when he first presented it there in the 1280s. This experience supposedly is what led him to revise the Art (creating the tertiary version). Llull's Art was never adopted by mainstream academia of the thirteenth and early-fourteenth centuries, but it did accrue quite a bit of interest. A significant number of Lullian manuscripts were collected by the Carthusian monks of Paris at Vauvert and by several theologians who donated their manuscripts to the Sorbonne Library. One disciple, Thomas Le Myésier, went so far as to create elaborate compilations of Llull's works, including a manuscript dedicated to the queen of France.

==== Opposition ====
In the 1360s the inquisitor Nicholas Eymerich condemned Lullism in Aragon. He obtained a papal bull in 1376 to prohibit Lullian teaching, although it proved ineffective. In Paris Jean Gerson also issued a series of polemical writings against Lullism. There was an official document issued to prohibit the Lullian Art from being taught in the Faculty of Theology.

=== Early modern ===
==== Academic theology ====
Llull's most significant early modern proponent was Nicholas of Cusa. He collected many works by Llull and adapted many aspects of Lullian thought for his own mystical theology. There was also growing interest in Lullism in Catalonia, Italy, and France. Jacques Lefèvre d'Étaples published eight of Llull's books in 1499, 1505, and 1516. Lefèvre was therefore responsible for the first significant circulation of Llull's work in print outside of Catalonia. It is thought that the influence of Lullian works in Renaissance Italy (coinciding with the rise of neoplatonism) contributed to a development in metaphysics, from a static Artistotelian notion of being to reality as a dynamic process. In Northern and Central Europe Lullism was adopted by Lutherans and Calvinists interested in promoting programs of theological humanism. Gottfried Leibniz was exposed to these currents during his years in Mainz, and Llull's Art clearly informed his De Arte Combinatoria.

==== Pseudo-Lullian Alchemy and Encyclopedism ====
There is a significant body of alchemical treatises falsely attributed to Llull. The two fundamental works of the corpus are the Testamentum and the Liber de secretis naturae seu de quinta essentia which both date to the fourteenth century. Occultists such as Heinrich Cornelius Agrippa and Giordano Bruno were inspired by these works. Despite Llull's growing identification with alchemy and Neoplatonic mysticism, others (such as Giulio Pace and Johann Heinrich Alsted) were still interested in the Lullian Art as a universal logic, even in the seventeenth century when Descartes and Ramus proposed competing systems.

==== Iberian Revival and beatification ====
Meanwhile, in Spain, the Cardinal Francisco Jiménez de Cisneros, Archbishop of Toledo, had taken up Lullism for his project of reform. Cisneros mobilized various intellectuals and editors, founding chairs at universities and publishing Llull's works. Founded in 1633, the Pontifical College of La Sapiencia on Mallorca became the epicenter for teaching Lullism. The Franciscans from La Sapiencia were the ones to seek Llull's canonization at Rome in the seventeenth century. These efforts were renewed in the eighteenth century, but never succeeded. Llull was beatified in 1847 by Pope Pius IX. His feast day was assigned to 30 June and is celebrated by the Third Order of St. Francis.

=== Twentieth and twenty-first centuries ===
==== Scholarship ====
Llull is now recognized by scholars as significant in both the history of Catalan literature as well as intellectual history. From 1906 to 1950 the Comissió Editora Lul·liana led a project to edit Llull's works written in Catalan. This series was called the Obres de Ramon Llull (ORL). In 1957 the Raimundus-Lullus-Institut was founded in Freiburg, Germany to begin the work of editing Llull's Latin works. This series is called the Raimundi Lulli Opera Latina (ROL) and is still ongoing. In 1990 the work on the Catalan texts was restarted with the Nova Edició de les Obres de Ramon Llull (NEORL). In the world of English-language scholarship on memory systems, the work of Frances Yates (Yates 1966) brought new interest to Ramon Llull as a figure in the history of cognitive systems.

==== Art and fiction ====
Llull has appeared in the art and literature of the last century, especially in the genres of surrealism, philosophical fantasy, and metafiction. Salvador Dalí's alchemical thought was influenced by Ramon Llull and Dalí incorporated the diagrams from the Lullian Art into his work called Alchimie des Philosophes. In 1937 Jorge Luis Borges wrote a snippet called "Ramon Llull's Thinking Machine" proposing the Lullian Art as a device to produce poetry. Other notable references to Ramon Llull are: Aldous Huxley's short story The Death of Lully, a fictionalized account aftermath of Llull's stoning in Tunis, set aboard the Genoese ship that returned him to Mallorca. Paul Auster refers to Llull (as Raymond Lull) in his memoir The Invention of Solitude in the second part, The Book of Memory. Llull is also a major character in The Box of Delights, a children's novel by poet John Masefield.

==== Other recognition ====
Llull's Art is sometimes recognized as a precursor to computer science and computation theory. With the discovery in 2001 of his lost manuscripts, Ars notandi, Ars eleccionis, and Alia ars eleccionis, together known as Ars Magna (what today would be called a logical system to discover some sort of truth), Llull is also given credit for creating an electoral system now known as the Borda count and Condorcet criterion, which Jean-Charles de Borda and Nicolas de Condorcet independently proposed centuries later.

== Translations ==
- Ramon Llull's New Rhetoric, text and translation of Llull's 'Rethorica Nova', edited and translated by Mark D. Johnston, Davis, California: Hermagoras Press, 1994
- Selected Works of Ramon Llull (1232‑1316), edited and translated by Anthony Bonner, Princeton, N.J.: Princeton University Press 1985, two volumes XXXI + 1330 pp. (Contents: vol. 1: The Book of the Gentile and the Three Wise Men, pp. 93–305; Ars Demonstrativa, pp. 317–567; Ars Brevis, pp. 579–646; vol. 2: Felix: or the Book of Wonders, pp. 659–1107; Principles of Medicine pp. 1119–1215; Flowers of Love and Flowers of Intelligence, pp. 1223–1256)
- Doctor Illuminatus: A Ramon Llull Reader, edited and translated by Anthony Bonner, with a new translation of The Book of the Lover and the Beloved by Eve Bonner, Princeton, N.J.: Princeton University Press 1994. Includes The Book of the Gentile and the Three Wise Men, The Book of the Lover and the Beloved, The Book of the Beasts, and Ars brevis; as well as Bonner's "Historical Background and Life" at 1–44, "Llull's Thought" at 45–56, "Llull's Influence: The History of Lullism" at 57–71.

== See also ==
- Apologetics
- Catalan literature
- List of pioneers in computer science
- Volvelle
- Book of the Dispute of Raymond the Christian and Omar the Saracen
