= Tree of Science (Ramon Llull) =

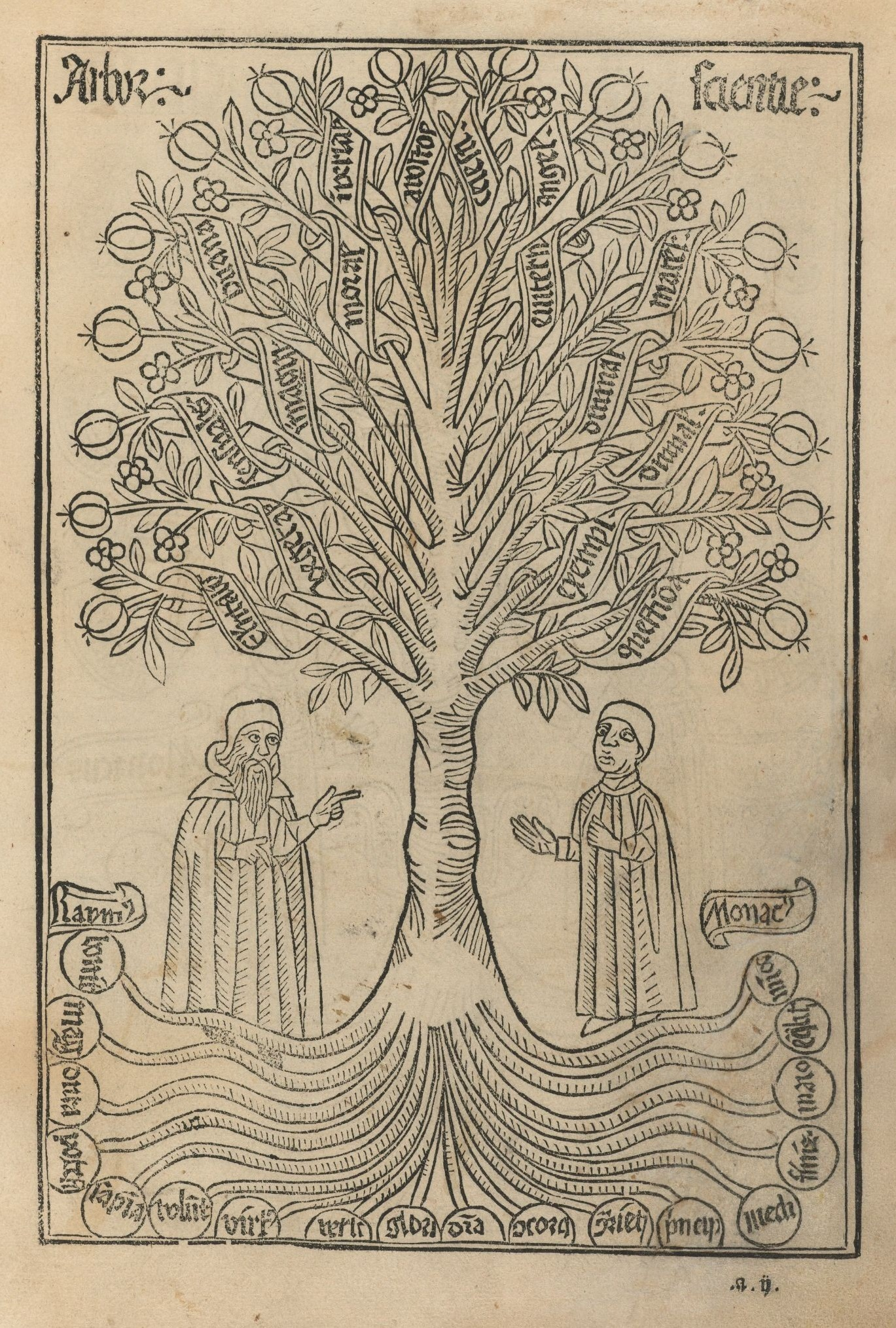
Image from a 1505 edition of Arbre de ciència. Printed in Barcelona.

The Tree of Science (Arbre de la ciència, Arbor Scientiae) is a work by Ramon Llull that he wrote in Rome between 1295 and 1296.

== Summary ==
An encyclopaedic version of Ars magna or Llull's Art, the Tree of Science consists of sixteen parts, or trees. The first fourteen trees constitute the hierarchy of reality: elemental, vegetal, sensual, imaginal, human, moral, imperial, apostolic, celestial, angelic, “eviternal” (pertaining to life after death), maternal (pertaining to the Virgin Mary), divine and human (pertaining to Jesus), and divine (pertaining to God) trees. The last two trees, the tree of examples and the tree of questions, show how to take concepts from the first fourteen trees and formulate examples and questions in order to further investigate the properties of reality. Each tree is in turn divided into seven parts: roots, trunk, branches, twigs, leaves, flowers, and fruit. In every tree the roots represent the general principles of the Lullian Art (goodness, greatness, duration, power, wisdom, will, virtue, truth, glory, difference, concordance, contrariety, beginning, middle, end, majority, equality and minority) and each successive part of the tree shows how the principles come together to form more specific, complex elements of reality.
