= Randa, Switzerland =

Randa
- Municipality
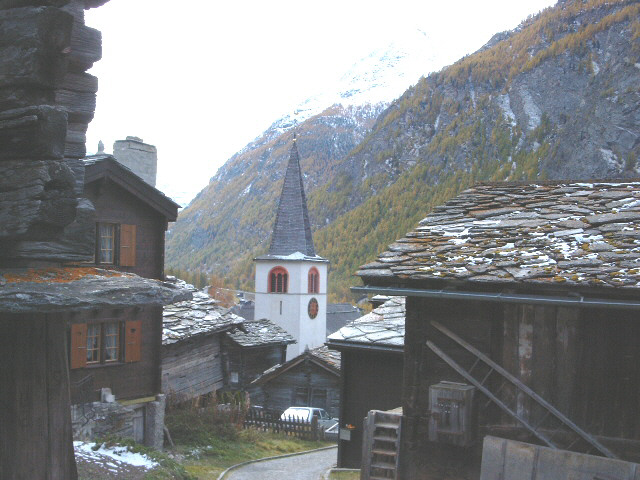
- Randa village

- Flag Coat of arms
- Location of Randa
- Location within Switzerland Location within Canton of Valais
- Coordinates: 46°06′N 7°47′E
- Country: Switzerland
- Canton: Valais
- District: Visp

Government
  - Mayor: Leo Jörger

Area
  - Total: 54.53 km^{2} (21.05 sq mi)
- Elevation: 1,406 m (4,613 ft)

Population (2002)
  - Total: 424
  - Density: 7.78/km^{2} (20.1/sq mi)
- Time zone: UTC+01:00 (CET)
  - Summer (DST): UTC+02:00 (CEST)
- Postal code: 3928
- SFOS number: 6287
- ISO 3166 code: CH-VS
- Localities: Wildi
- Surrounded by: Ayer, Oberems, Saas Fee, Sankt Niklaus, Täsch, Zermatt
- Website: randa.ch

Randa is a municipality in the district of Visp in the canton of Valais in Switzerland. It is located between the Weisshorn and the Dom in the Matter Valley. The village is accessible by road and rail, and it has a campsite which offers a taxi service to Zermatt, a car-free town. The Glacier Express train line also connects Randa to Zermatt.

== History ==
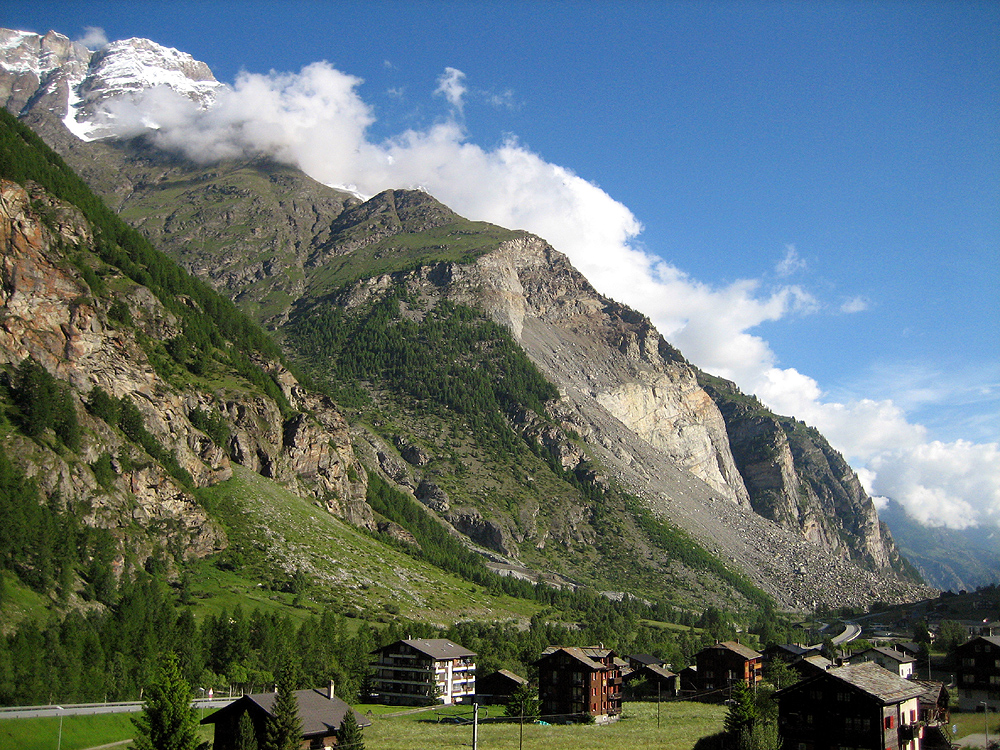
The Randa rockslide source and debris deposit seen over the town of Randa.

Randa is first mentioned in 1305 as Randa.

In 1819, the village was almost totally destroyed by the blast from a huge avalanche that fell nearby.

In 1991, a portion of the village was flooded following a large rockslide from a cliff above the town.

Randa is a two-hour hike from the Charles Kuonen Suspension Bridge, the world's longest simple suspension bridge for pedestrians. It was opened in 2017 as part of the Europaweg, the scenic hiking route between Grächen and Zermatt.

== Geography ==
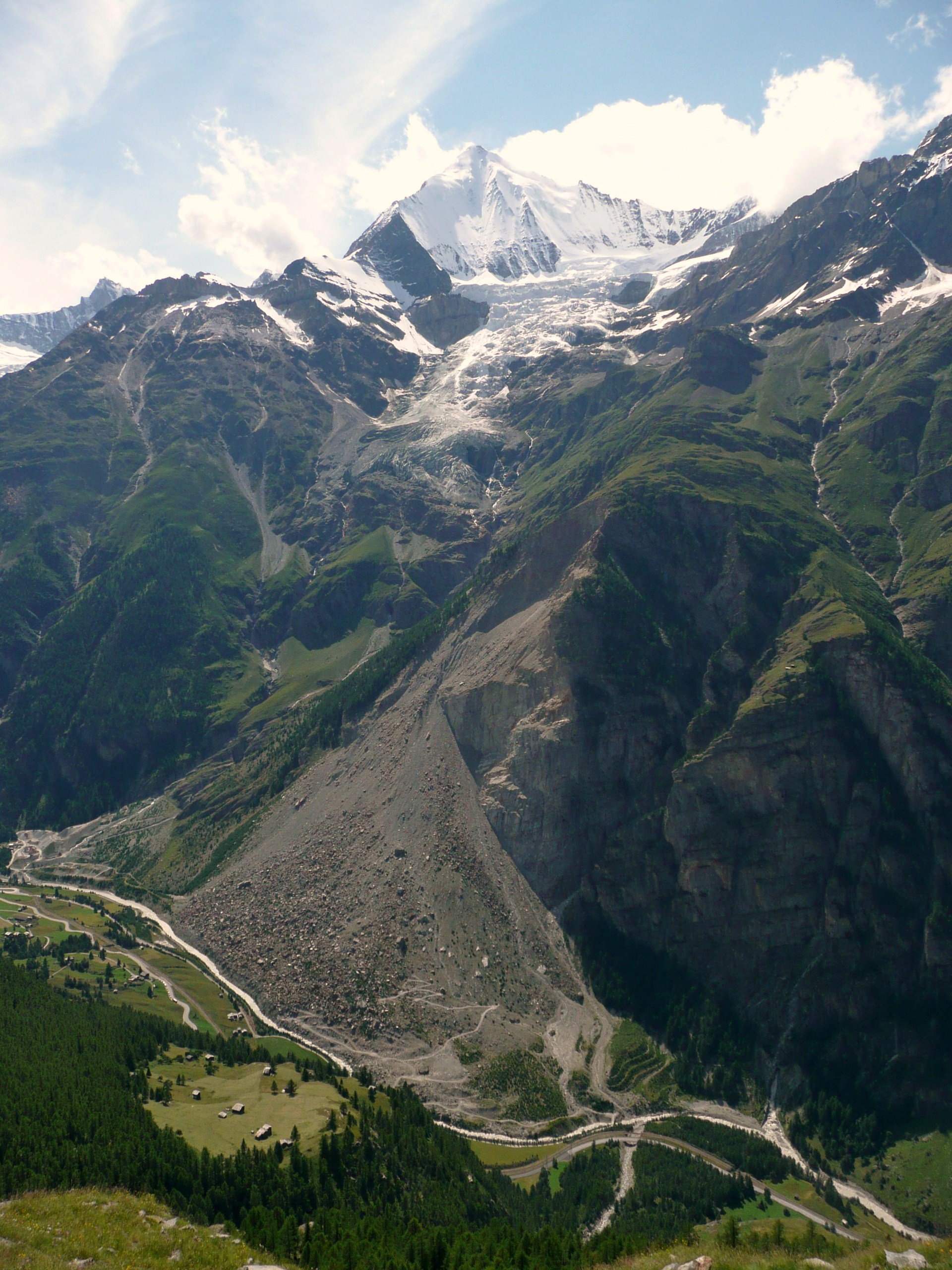
The recent landslide above Randa

Randa has an area, as of 2011, of 54.5 square kilometers (21.0 mi^{2}). Of this area, 8.0% is used for agricultural purposes, while 9.9% is forested. Of the rest of the land, 0.6% is settled (buildings or roads) and 81.5% is unproductive land.

The municipality is located in the Visp district, in the Matter valley. It consists of the village of Randa and the hamlets of Lerch, Wildi and Attermänze.

== Coat of arms ==
The blazon of the municipal coat of arms is Divided by a Bend Argent, Gules a Mullet [of Six] of the First and Vert an Edelweiss proper slipped.

== Demographics ==
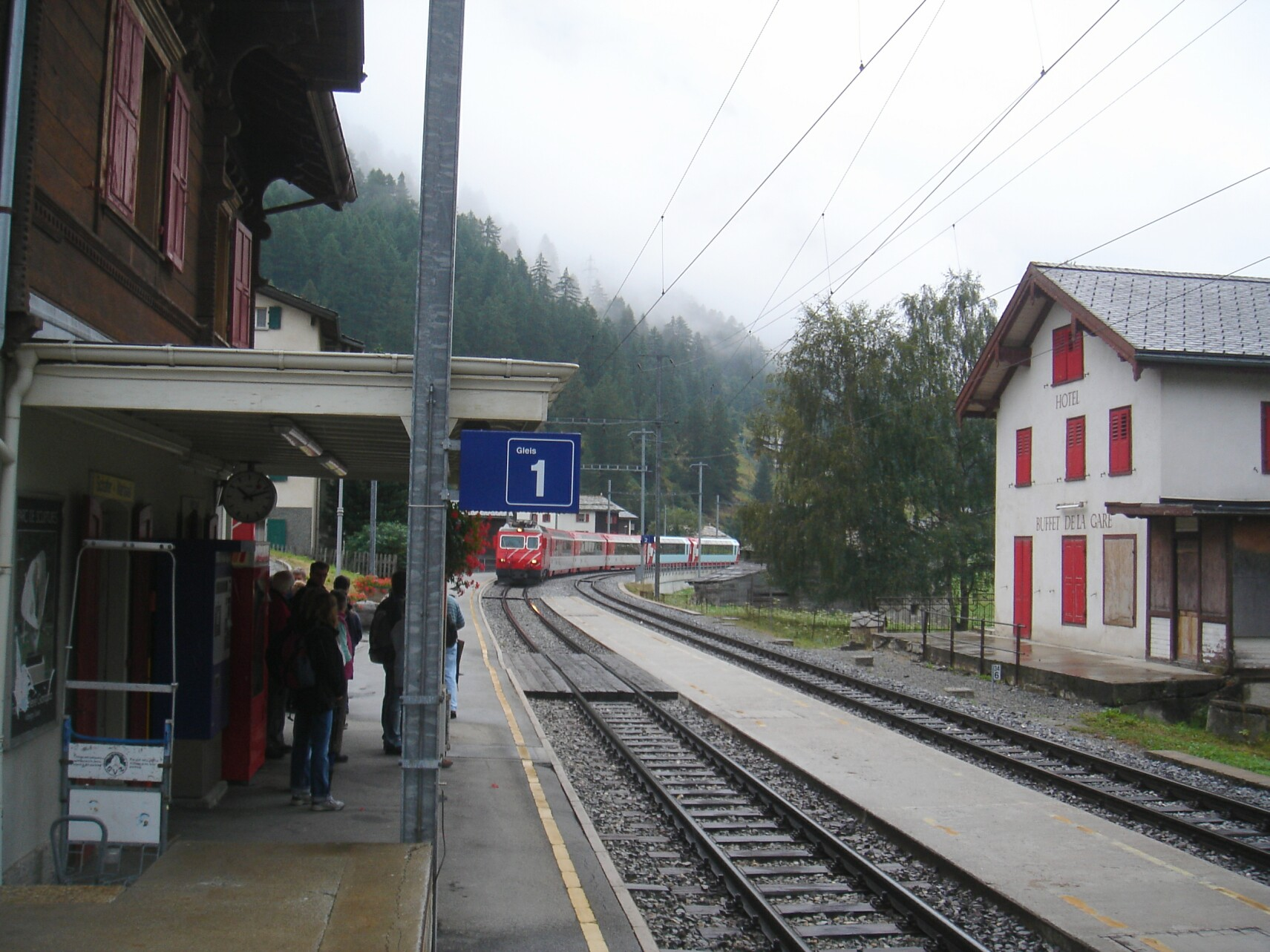
Randa train station

Randa has a population (as of December 2020) of 425. As of 2008, 22.7% of the population are resident foreign nationals. Over the last 10 years (2000–2010 ) the population has changed at a rate of -9.7%. It has changed at a rate of -3.5% due to migration and at a rate of -2.8% due to births and deaths.

Most of the population (as of 2000) speaks German (320 or 79.2%) as their first language, Albanian is the second most common (55 or 13.6%) and Serbo-Croatian is the third (17 or 4.2%). There is 1 person who speaks French, 1 person who speaks Italian.

As of 2008, the population was 46.7% male and 53.3% female. The population was made up of 133 Swiss men (33.9% of the population) and 50 (12.8%) non-Swiss men. There were 160 Swiss women (40.8%) and 49 (12.5%) non-Swiss women. Of the population in the municipality, 240 or about 59.4% were born in Randa and lived there in 2000. There were 51 or 12.6% who were born in the same canton, while 26 or 6.4% were born somewhere else in Switzerland, and 84 or 20.8% were born outside of Switzerland.

As of 2000, children and teenagers (0–19 years old) make up 27.7% of the population, while adults (20–64 years old) make up 59.7% and seniors (over 64 years old) make up 12.6%.

As of 2000, there were 195 people who were single and never married in the municipality. There were 188 married individuals, 16 widows or widowers and 5 individuals who are divorced.

As of 2000, there were 146 private households in the municipality, and an average of 2.8 persons per household. There were 40 households that consist of only one person and 22 households with five or more people. In 2000, a total of 145 apartments (43.0% of the total) were permanently occupied, while 151 apartments (44.8%) were seasonally occupied and 41 apartments (12.2%) were empty. The vacancy rate for the municipality, in 2010, was 0.29%.

The historical population is given in the following chart:

== Politics ==
In the 2007 federal election the most popular party was the CVP which received 72.09% of the vote. The next three most popular parties were the SP (12.69%), the SVP (11.9%) and the Green Party (1.66%). In the federal election, a total of 166 votes were cast, and the voter turnout was 59.3%.

In the 2009 Conseil d'État/Staatsrat election a total of 147 votes were cast, of which 14 or about 9.5% were invalid. The voter participation was 54.2%, which is similar to the cantonal average of 54.67%. In the 2007 Swiss Council of States election a total of 164 votes were cast, of which 6 or about 3.7% were invalid. The voter participation was 59.6%, which is similar to the cantonal average of 59.88%.

== Economy ==
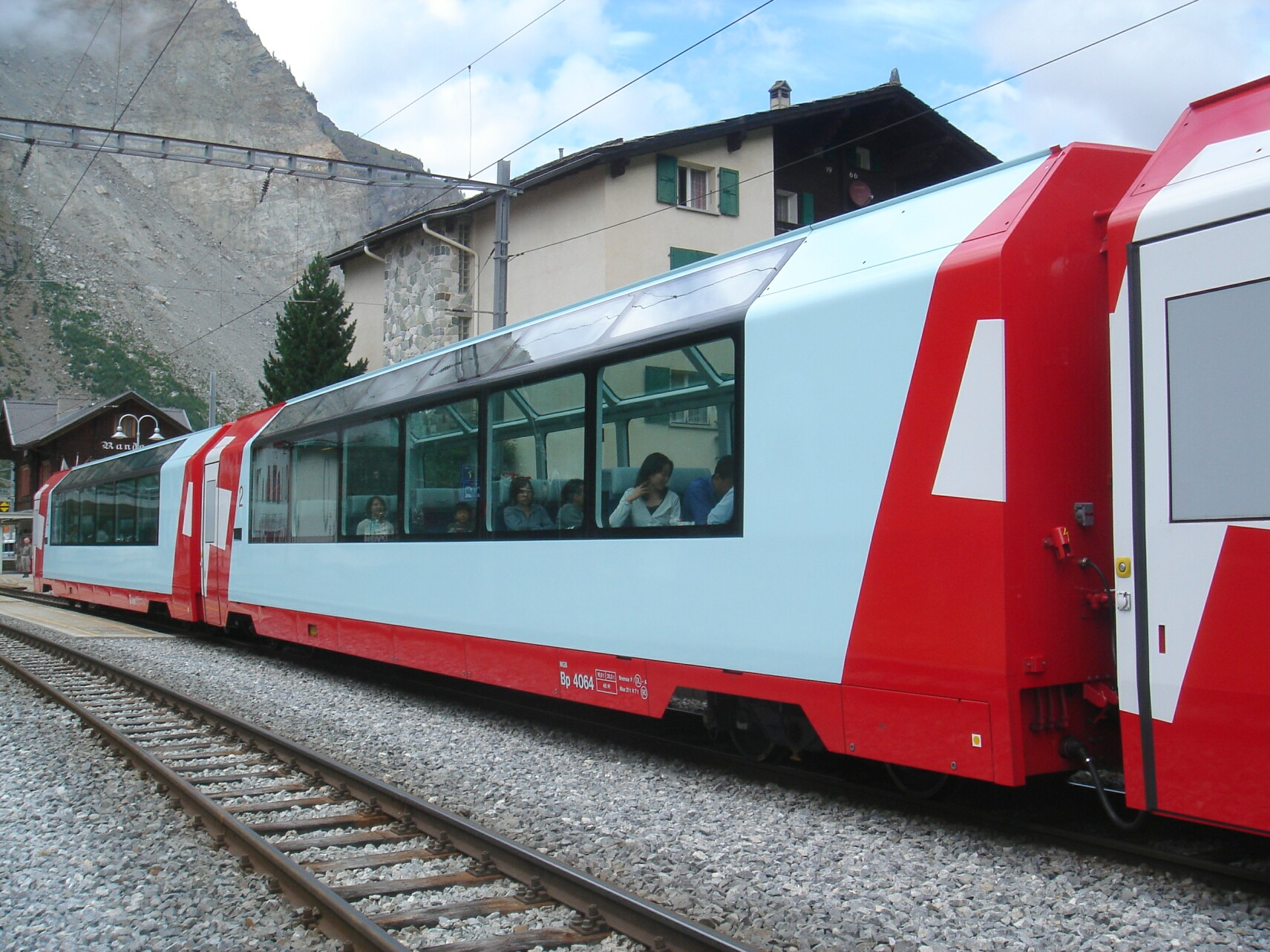
Glacier Express at the railway station

As of 2010, Randa had an unemployment rate of 3.1%. As of 2008, there were 32 people employed in the primary economic sector and about 11 businesses involved in this sector. 46 people were employed in the secondary sector and there were 6 businesses in this sector. 35 people were employed in the tertiary sector, with 11 businesses in this sector. There were 188 residents of the municipality who were employed in some capacity, of which females made up 41.0% of the workforce.

In 2008 the total number of full-time equivalent jobs was 86. The number of jobs in the primary sector was 13, of which 6 were in agriculture and 7 were in forestry or lumber production. The number of jobs in the secondary sector was 46 of which 9 or (19.6%) were in manufacturing and 37 (80.4%) were in construction. The number of jobs in the tertiary sector was 27. In the tertiary sector; 1 was in the sale or repair of motor vehicles, 2 or 7.4% were in the movement and storage of goods, 12 or 44.4% were in a hotel or restaurant, 1 was the insurance or financial industry, 2 or 7.4% were technical professionals or scientists, 5 or 18.5% were in education.

In 2000, there were 19 workers who commuted into the municipality and 138 workers who commuted away. The municipality is a net exporter of workers, with about 7.3 workers leaving the municipality for every one entering. Of the working population, 46.3% used public transportation to get to work, and 35.6% used a private car.

== Religion ==
From the 2000 census, 328 or 81.2% were Roman Catholic, while 11 or 2.7% belonged to the Swiss Reformed Church. Of the rest of the population, there were 4 members of an Orthodox church (or about 0.99% of the population). There were 55 (or about 13.61% of the population) who were Islamic. 1 (or about 0.25% of the population) belonged to no church, are agnostic or atheist, and 5 individuals (or about 1.24% of the population) did not answer the question.

== Education ==
In Randa about 178 or (44.1%) of the population have completed non-mandatory upper secondary education, and 13 or (3.2%) have completed additional higher education (either university or a Fachhochschule). Of the 13 who completed tertiary schooling, 76.9% were Swiss men, 15.4% were Swiss women.

As of 2000, there was one student in Randa who came from another municipality, while 28 residents attended schools outside the municipality.
