= Puig de Randa =

Mountain in Balearic Islands, Spain

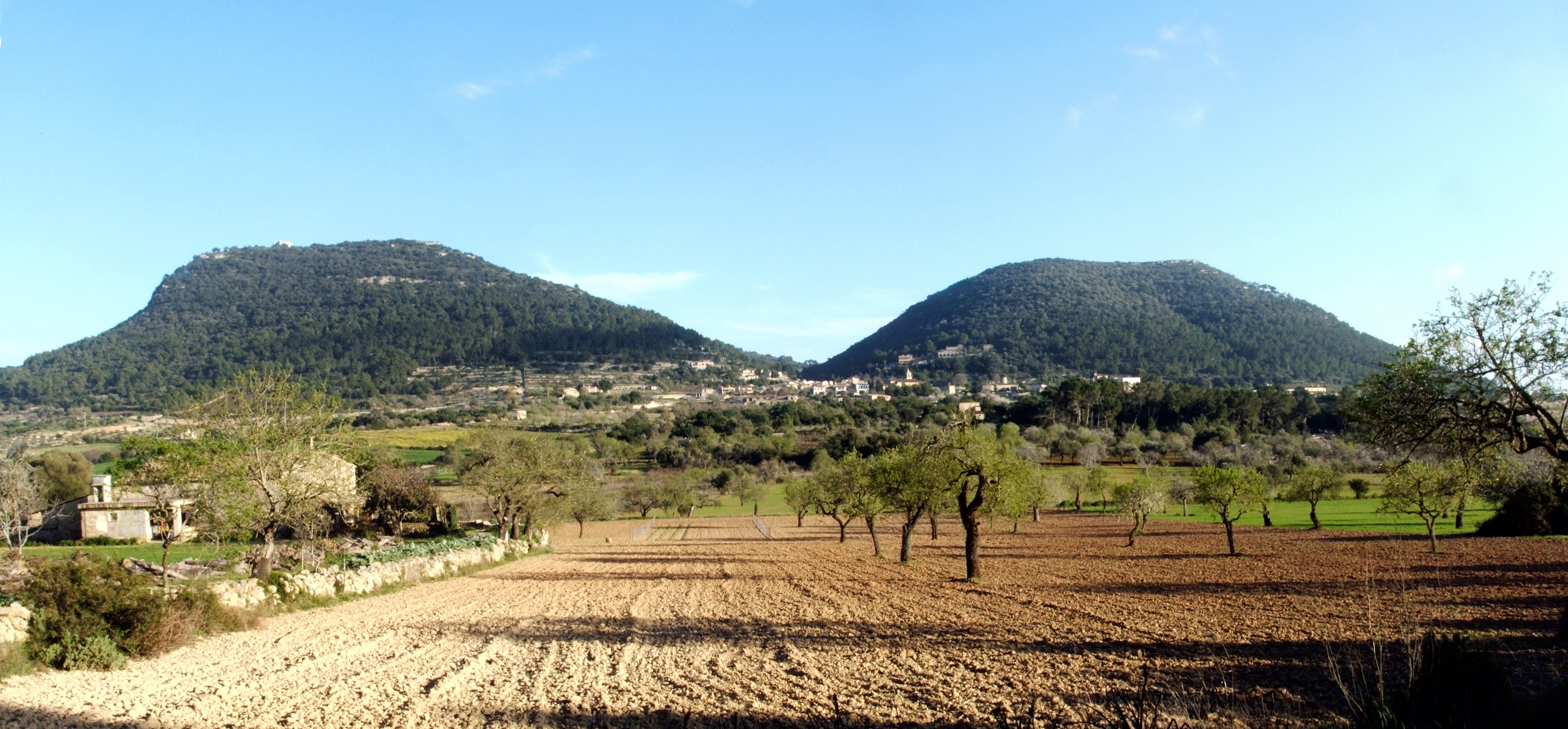

Highest point
- Elevation: 543 m (1,781 ft)
- Coordinates: 39°31′38″N 2°55′29″E

Geography
- Location: Majorca, Balearic Islands, Spain

Puig de Randa is a mountain in the island of Majorca, Balearic Islands, Spain. It is included in the municipal territory of Algaida, and, on its top, is home to the Sanctuary of Cura.

The Puig de Randa is the place where Ramon Llull went to do penance after his conversion.

== See also ==
- Ramon Llull
