= Planisphere =

Class of star chart

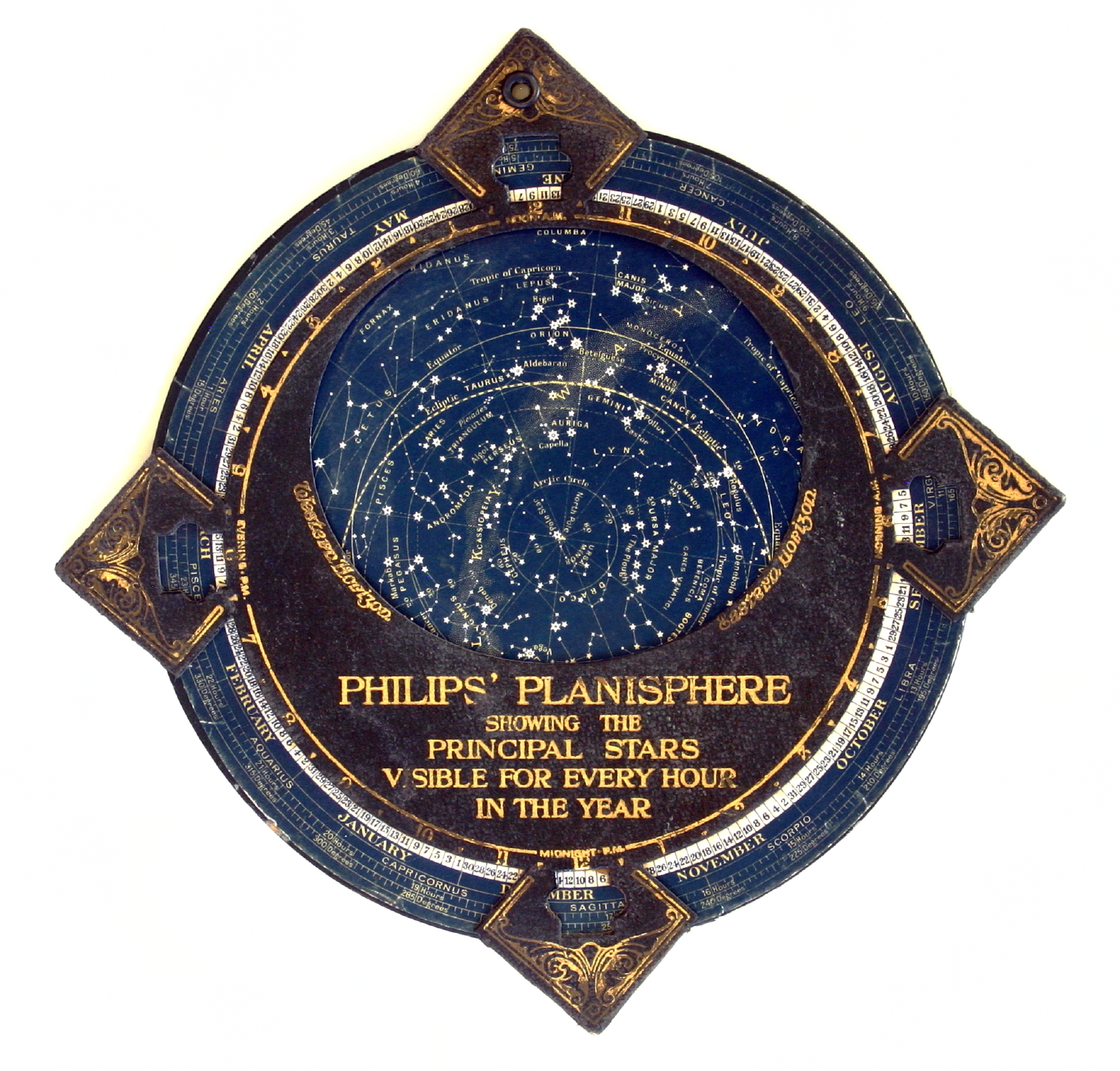
Philips' Planisphere, ca. 1900

In astronomy, a planisphere (/ˈpleɪ.nɪˌsfɪər, ˈplæn.ɪ-/) is a star chart analog computing instrument in the form of two adjustable disks that rotate on a common pivot. It can be adjusted to display the visible stars for any time and date for a given latitude. It is an instrument to assist in learning how to recognize stars and constellations. The astrolabe, an instrument that has its origins in Hellenistic astronomy, is a predecessor of the modern planisphere. The term planisphere contrasts with armillary sphere, where the celestial sphere is represented by a three-dimensional framework of rings.

== Description ==
A planisphere consists of a circular star chart attached at its center to an opaque circular overlay that has a clear window or hole so that only a portion of the sky map will be visible in the window or hole area at any given time. The chart and overlay are mounted so that they are free to rotate about a common axis. The star chart contains the brightest stars, constellations and (possibly) deep-sky objects visible from a particular latitude on Earth. The night sky that one sees from the Earth depends on whether the observer is in the Northern Hemisphere or the Southern Hemisphere and the latitude. A planisphere window is designed for a particular latitude and will be accurate enough for a certain band either side of that. Planisphere makers will usually offer them in a number of versions for different latitudes. Planispheres only show the stars visible from the observer's latitude; stars below the horizon are masked.

A complete twenty-four-hour time cycle is marked on the rim of the overlay. A full twelve months of calendar dates are marked on the rim of the starchart. The window is marked to show the direction of the eastern and western horizons. The disk and overlay are adjusted so that the observer's local time of day on the overlay corresponds to that day's date on the star chart disc. The portion of the star chart visible in the window then represents (with a distortion because it is a flat surface representing a spherical volume) the distribution of stars in the sky at that moment for the planisphere's designed location. Users hold the planisphere above their head with the eastern and western horizons correctly aligned to match the chart to actual star positions.

== History ==
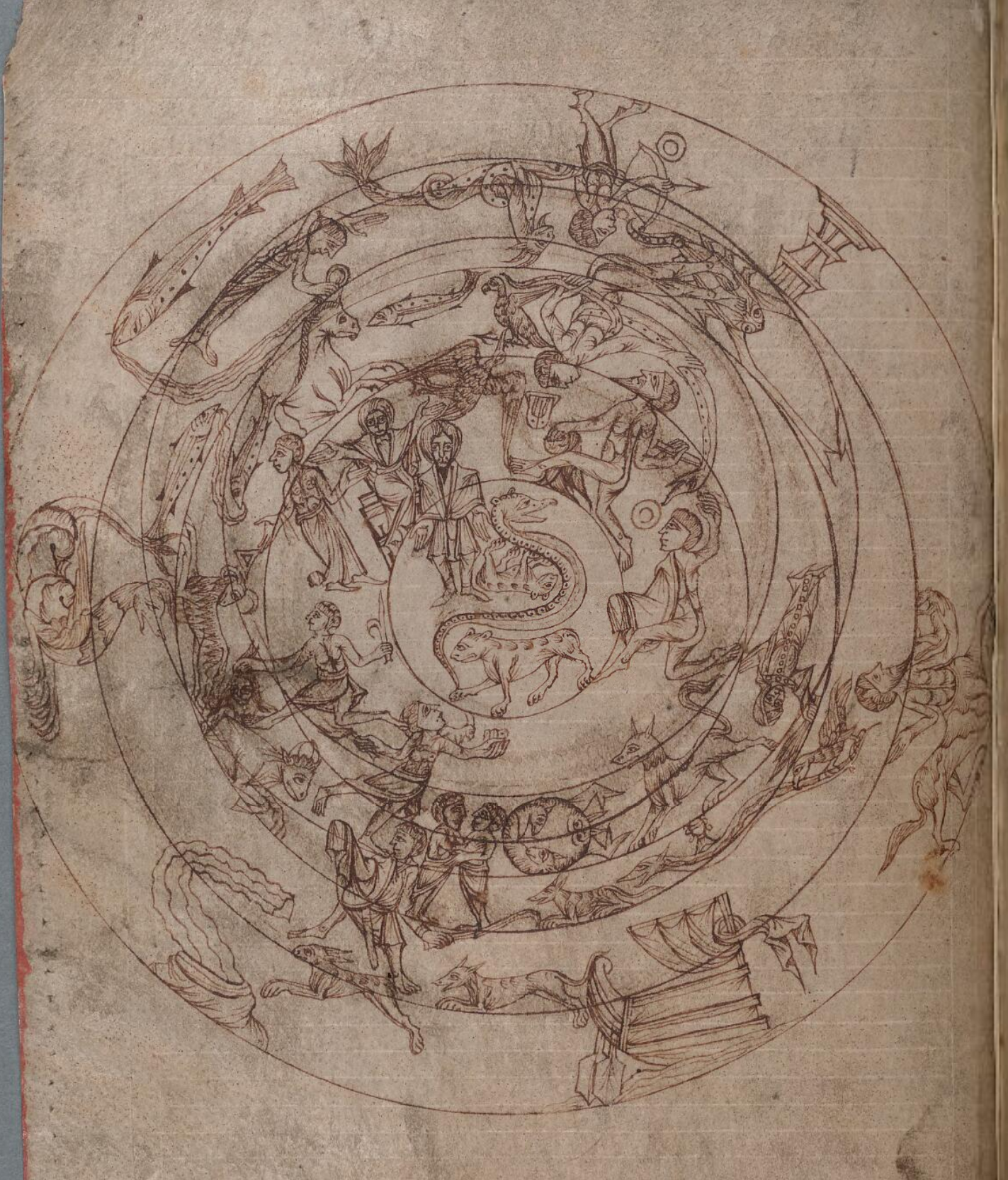
Medieval planisphere, c. 1000. National Library of Wales MS 735C, Aberystwyth.

The word planisphere (Latin planisphaerium) was originally used in the second century by Claudius Ptolemy to describe the representation of a spherical Earth by a map drawn in the plane. This usage continued into the Renaissance: for example Gerardus Mercator described his 1569 world map as a planisphere.

In this article the word describes the representation of the star-filled celestial sphere on a flat disc. The first star chart to have the name "planisphere" was made in 1624 by Jacob Bartsch. Bartsch was the son-in-law of Johannes Kepler, discoverer of Kepler's laws of planetary motion.

== The star chart ==
Since the planisphere shows the celestial sphere in a printed flat, there is always considerable distortion. Planispheres, like all charts, are made using a certain projection method. For planispheres there are two major methods in use, leaving the choice with the designer. One such method is the polar azimuthal equidistant projection. Using this projection the sky is charted centered on one of the celestial poles (polar), while circles of equal declination (for instance 60°, 30°, 0° (the celestial equator), −30°, and −60°) lie equidistant from each other and from the poles (equidistant). The shapes of the constellations are proportionally correct in a straight line from the centre outwards, but at right angles to this direction (parallel to the declination circles) there is considerable distortion. That distortion will be worse as the distance to the pole gets greater. If we study the famous constellation of Orion in this projection and compare this to the real Orion, we can clearly see this distortion. One notable planisphere using azimuthal equidistant projection addresses this issue by printing a northern view on one side and the southern view on the other, thus reducing the distance charted from the center outward.

The stereographic projection solves this problem while introducing another. Using this projection the distances between the declination circles are enlarged in such a way that the shapes of the constellations remain correct. Naturally in this projection the constellations on the edge become too large in comparison to constellations near the celestial pole: Orion will be twice as high as it should be. (This is the same effect that makes Greenland so huge in Mercator maps.) Another disadvantage is that, with more space for constellations near the edge of the planisphere, the space for the constellations around the celestial pole in question will be less than they deserve. For observers at moderate latitudes, who can see the sky near the celestial pole of their hemisphere better than that nearer the horizon, this may be a good reason to prefer a planisphere made with the polar azimuthal equidistant projection method.

== The upper disc ==
The upper disc contains a "horizon", that defines the visible part of the sky at any given moment, which is naturally half of the total starry sky. That horizon line is most of the time also distorted, for the same reason the constellations are distorted. The horizon line on a stereographic projection is a perfect circle. The horizon line on other projections is a kind of "collapsed" oval. The horizon is designed for a particular latitude and thus determines the area for which a planisphere is meant. Some more expensive planispheres have several upper discs that can be exchanged, or have an upper disc with more horizon-lines, for different latitudes.

When a planisphere is used in a latitude zone other than the zone for which it was designed, the user will either see stars that are not in the planisphere, or the planisphere will show stars that are not visible in that latitude zone's sky. To study the starry sky thoroughly it may be necessary to buy a planisphere particularly for the latitude in question.

However, most of the time the part of the sky near the horizon will not show many stars, due to hills, woods, buildings or just because of the thickness of the atmosphere we look through. The lower 5° above the horizon in particular hardly shows any stars (let alone objects) except under the very best conditions. Therefore, a planisphere can fairly accurately be used from +5° to −5° of the design latitude. For example, a planisphere for 40° north can be used between 35° and 45° north.

== Coordinates ==
Accurate planispheres represent the celestial coordinates: right ascension and declination. The changing positions of planets, asteroids or comets in terms of these coordinates can be looked up in annual astronomical guides, and these enable planisphere users to find them in the sky.

Some planispheres use a separate pointer for the declination, using the same pivot point as the upper disc. Some planispheres have a declination feature printed on the upper disc, along the line connecting north and south on the horizon. Right ascension is represented on the edge, where the dates with which to set the planisphere are also found.

== See also ==
- Celestial globe - the representation of the starry sky on an apparent celestial sphere.
- List of astronomical instruments
- Armillary sphere - a framework of brass rings, which represent the principal circles of the heavens.
- Volvelle
