= Tunnels of Armageddon =

1989 video game

- Developer: Logical Design Works
- Publisher: California Dreams
- Platforms: Amiga, Apple IIGS, MS-DOS
- Release: 1989
- Genre: Action/Racing
- Mode: Single player

Tunnels of Armageddon is a computer game involving racing and shooting while avoiding obstacles.

== Summary ==
The game features pseudo-3D graphics. Gameplay involves piloting a futuristic spacecraft through a series of tunnels to a destination within a certain time limit. Colliding into obstructions depletes a limited amount of shields given. The game is Sci-Fi in theme. The rather simple plot amounted to traversing deeper into tunnels to save Earth from evil aliens. The PC version had support for both EGA and VGA graphics, as well as an Ad-Lib or Soundblaster soundcard.
