= Randa rockslides =

1991 natural disasters in Switzerland

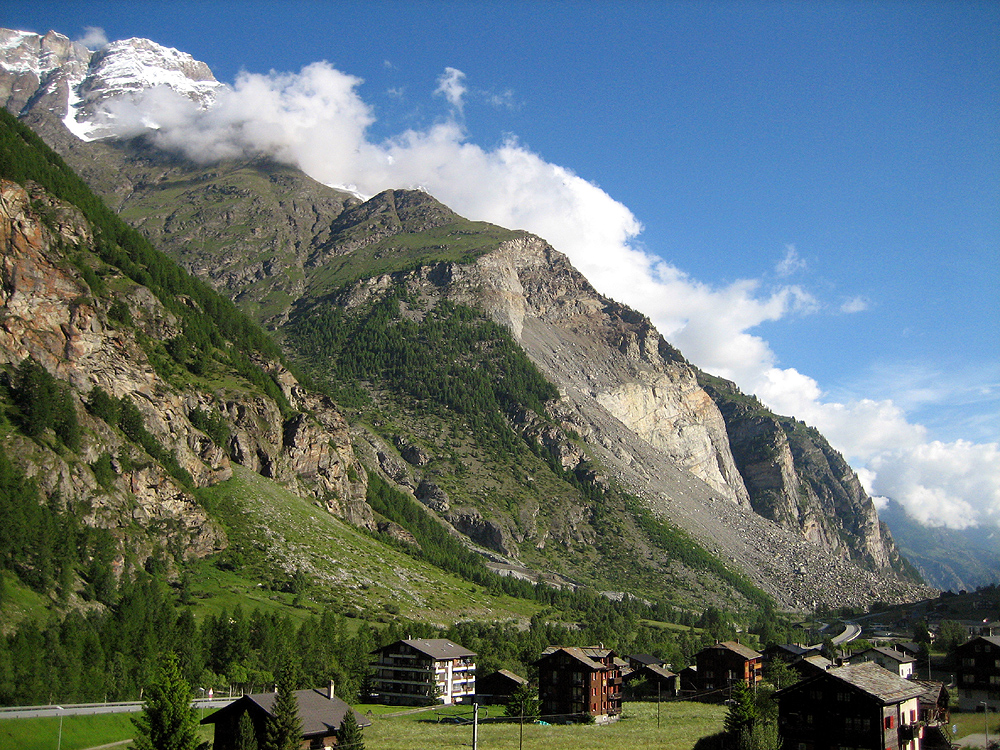
The Randa rockslide source region and debris deposit seen over the town of Randa, Valais, Switzerland. 46.110782°N 7.777578°E

In April and May 1991, two consecutive rockslides occurred from a cliff above the town of Randa in the Matter valley of Switzerland. The rockslides released a cumulative volume of approximately 30 million cubic meters of debris, with each of the rockslide stages occurring over several hours. Slide debris buried key regional transportation lines including the road and railway leading to Zermatt, and dammed the Mattervispa river which eventually flooded a portion of the town of Randa upstream. There were no fatalities resulting from either of the rockslide events, though livestock, farmhouses and holiday homes were destroyed.

== Geological situation ==
The Matter valley in the region of Randa exhibits classical morphology of glacial erosion, with steep rock walls and a wide valley bottom creating the common U-shaped form. Cliffs adjacent to the valley are exceptionally high, rising vertically some 800 m, while the nearby peaks of the Weisshorn and Dom sit 3000 m above the town of Randa.

Crystalline rocks of the slide source region belong to the Siviez–Mischabel nappe and primarily include a competent orthogneiss in the lower half of the slope overlain by highly jointed paragneisses and schists (Willenberg et al., 2008a). Foliation dips gently to the west / southwest (into the slope at the rockslide), cutting across the north-south trending Matter valley.

The site of the 1991 rockslides sits on a nose of rock on the western wall of the Matter valley, which has been significantly incised to the south by the Bis glacier. To the south and west of the eventual rockslides, an older progressive slope instability had developed leaving a noticeable scarp and debris cone. This scarp would eventually be cut by the 1991 rockslides.

Debris from the 1991 Randa rockslides with the channel cut for the Mattervispa river at the toe. The lower part of the rockslide source region is visible on the cliff above.

== Rockslides of 1991 ==
The 1991 rockslides at Randa consisted of two separate collapse events on April 18 and May 9, which released in total a cumulative volume of approximately 30 million cubic meters of rock. The elevation of the top of the scarp is 2320 m (7610 ft), while the elevation of deposit toe is 1320 m (4330 ft).

Accelerating occurrences of small rockfalls from the cliff in the decades preceding the slides gave indication of deeper movements, and fallen debris had eventually destroyed much of the forest beneath the cliff (Sartori et al., 2003). Precursory events noted immediately prior to the April, 1991 rockslide included explosive ruptures of rock slabs and new forceful water discharges from the face (Schindler et al., 1993).

18 April 1991: This primary rockslide event occurred over the span of a few hours time, producing a large steep debris cone and a thick layer of dust over the valley. The rockslide consisted of a progressive succession of smaller collapses and block failures involving first the lower and more competent orthogneiss, followed by retrogressive collapse of the highly jointed paragneiss above (Schindler et al., 1993). The total volume released during this rockslide phase was estimated to be 22 million cubic meters. Had this volume been released instantaneously, a devastating rock avalanche and far reaching deposit would have resulted. A lesser failure followed on April 22.

9 May 1991: Monitoring of deformation and microseismic activity led to accurate anticipation of this follow up rockslide event. The rockslide again occurred in a progressive manner over the course of a few hours, involving many small volume collapse events mostly within the upper paragneiss material (Schindler et al., 1993). These failures resulted in retreat and reduced the inclination of the upper part of the rockslide scarp. The total volume released in this second phase was estimated to be 7 million cubic meters.

No one trigger can be conclusively assigned as responsible for the Randa rockslides of 1991. The area has experienced a long history of moderate seismicity, but no significant earthquakes immediately preceded the failures. A warm period producing ample snow melt occurred in the days prior to the April rockslide, and water could be seen emanating from springs on the rock face. Further, a period of rapid cooling occurred just one day before the April slide. However, it is unknown if this series of events combined to act as an exceptional trigger, or if they were rather part of the normal seasonal climatic and hydraulic cycles (Sartori et al., 2003).

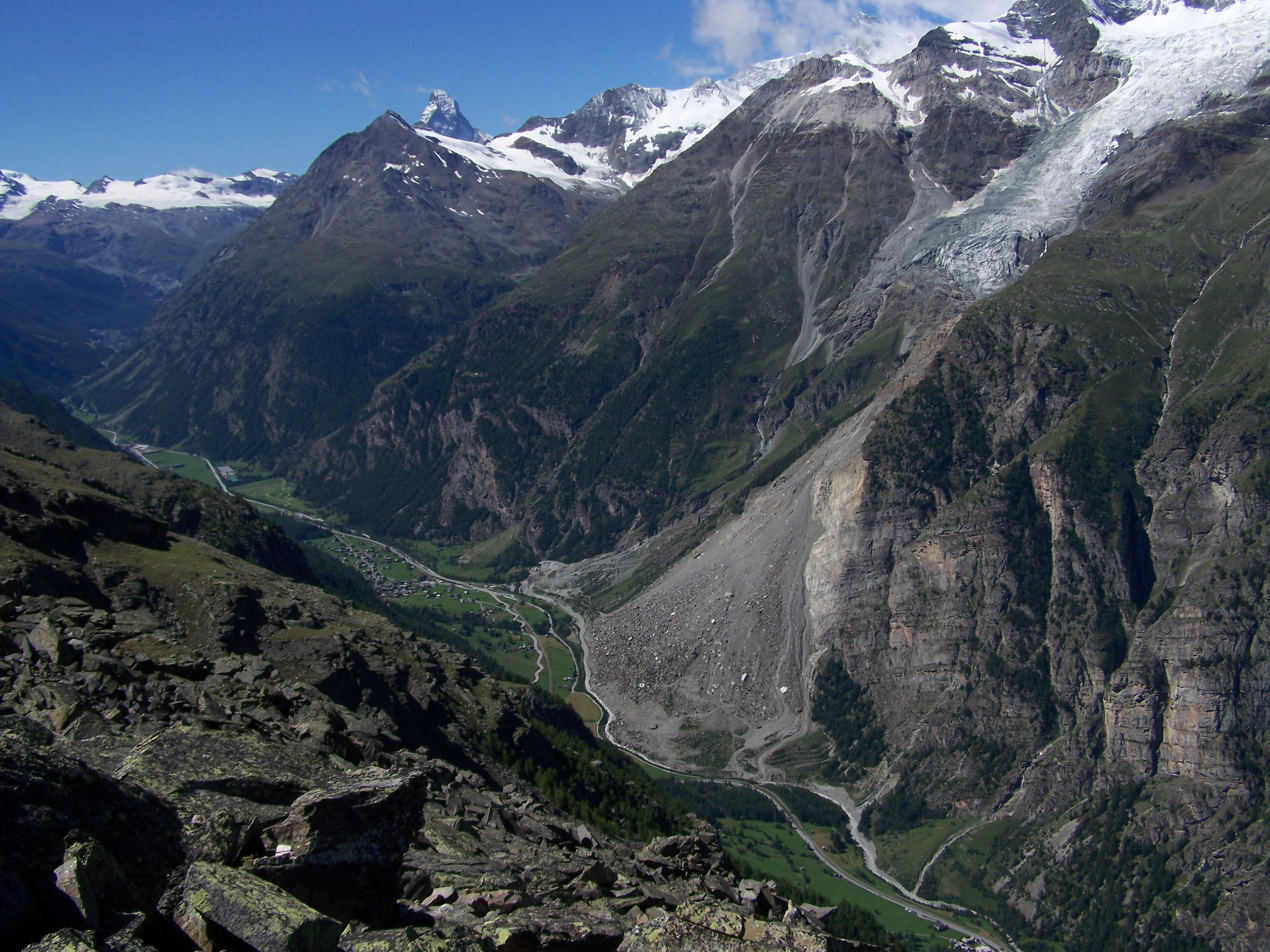
The large debris fan deposited by the 1991 rockslides can be seen above the village of Randa in the Matter valley.

== Damage and remediation ==
The road and rail line through the Matter valley are important tourist routes for visitors to the Matterhorn region. These transportation avenues were both interrupted by the April 18 rockslide. The May 9 event further cemented the problem. The rail line was buried for 800 m, while 200 m of the road was covered (Quanterra.org). The road and rail line have both since been re-routed to circumnavigate the rockslide deposit.

The rockslide debris also dammed the Mattervispa river, a problem that was again compounded by the second event. Work digging through the blockage was begun immediately, but heavy rain and snow melt eventually resulted in flooding of a portion of the town of Randa upstream. A channel was eventually cut and the water receded. The Swiss army had deployed a floating bridge in anticipation of the flooding, which successfully allowed the road upstream of the deposit to remain open. A nearly 4 km long bypass tunnel was then bored into the wall beneath the cliff to prevent any future floods.

Looking south to the Matter valley from the top of the Randa rockslide. The scarp of the 1991 rockslides can be seen in the foreground.

== Continued movement ==
Several million cubic meters of rock above and behind the scarp of the 1991 rockslides remains unstable today, moving towards the valley at rates up to 2 cm per year. This situation is not considered to be a critical hazard at the moment, but movements are carefully monitored and studied.

== Monitoring and geoscience ==
The Randa rockslide has long been the site of intensive geological, geotechnical, and geophysical research. Following the April, 1991 failure, monitoring instrumentation was installed that helped successfully predict the impending May rockslide. The site has since been monitored by Valais Kantonal authorities.

Since 2001, researchers from the Department of Earth Science at the Swiss Federal Institute of Technology (ETH, Zurich) have conducted studies into the cause and nature of the ongoing deformations. New monitoring and exploration techniques, combined with traditional geological investigations have revealed important insights into the process of progressive failure driving the current instability (Eberhardt et al., 2004; Heincke et al., 2006; Spillmann et al., 2007a,b; Willenberg et al., 2008a,b; Gischig et al., 2009; Moore et al., 2010; Burjanek et al., 2010; Gischig et al., 2011a,b,c; Moore et al., 2011a,b).

== See also ==
- Randa VS
