= Randa, Mallorca =

Human settlement in Algaida, Pla de Mallorca, Majorca, Spain

Coordinates: 39°31′35″N 2°54′55″E

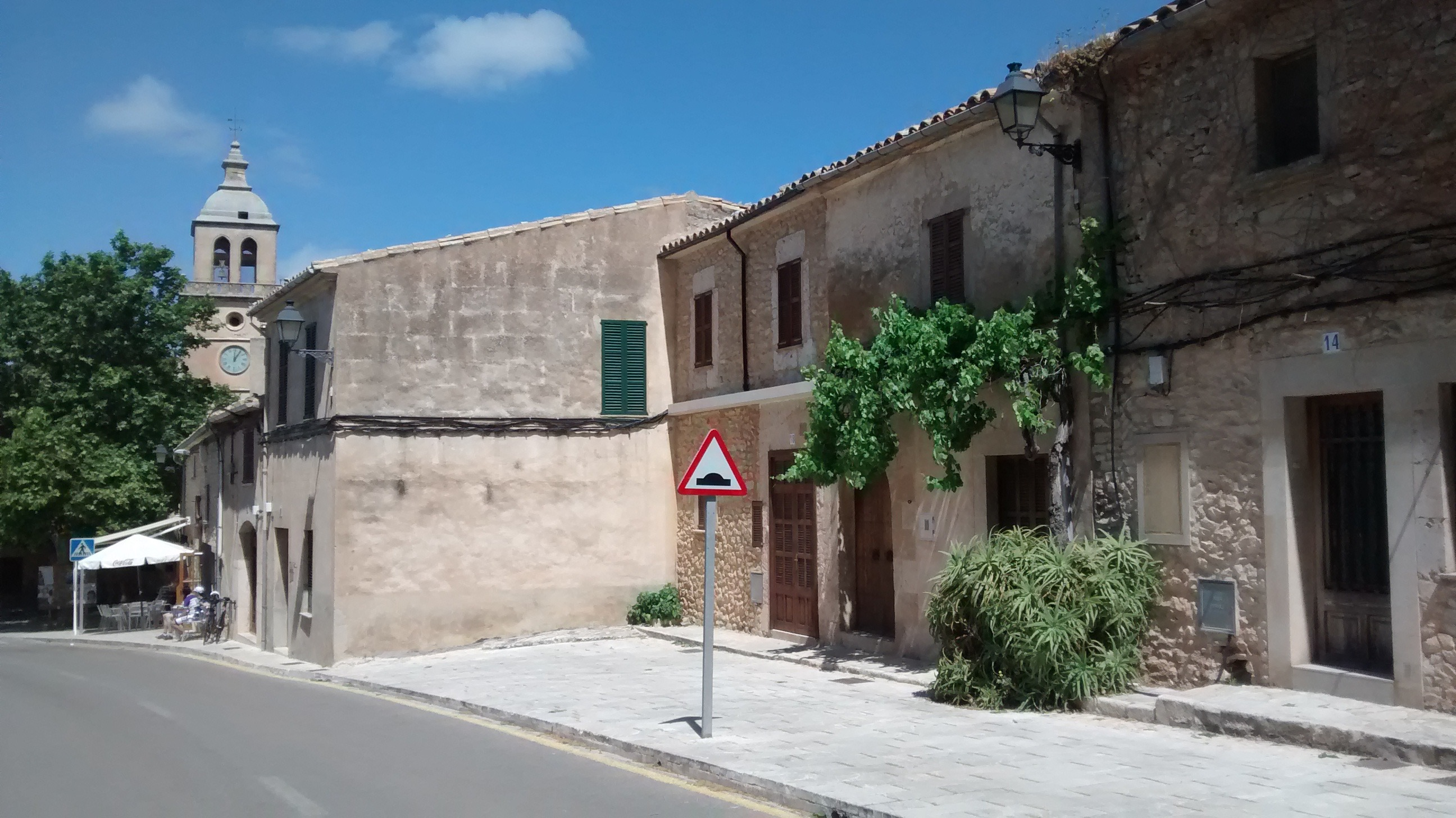
Randa

Randa is a village and nearby hermitage located in Mallorca, Spain. It is most famous for its long history of pilgrimage starting in 1275. Being the first hermitage of Mallorca, pilgrims are nowadays just as likely to be cyclists looking for a challenge as seekers of religious inspiration.

Licor Randa, an herbal liqueur is an indigenous specialty of the area.
