= Mischabel Hut =

Mountain hut in Valais, Switzerland

Coordinates: 46°06′33″N 7°53′20″E

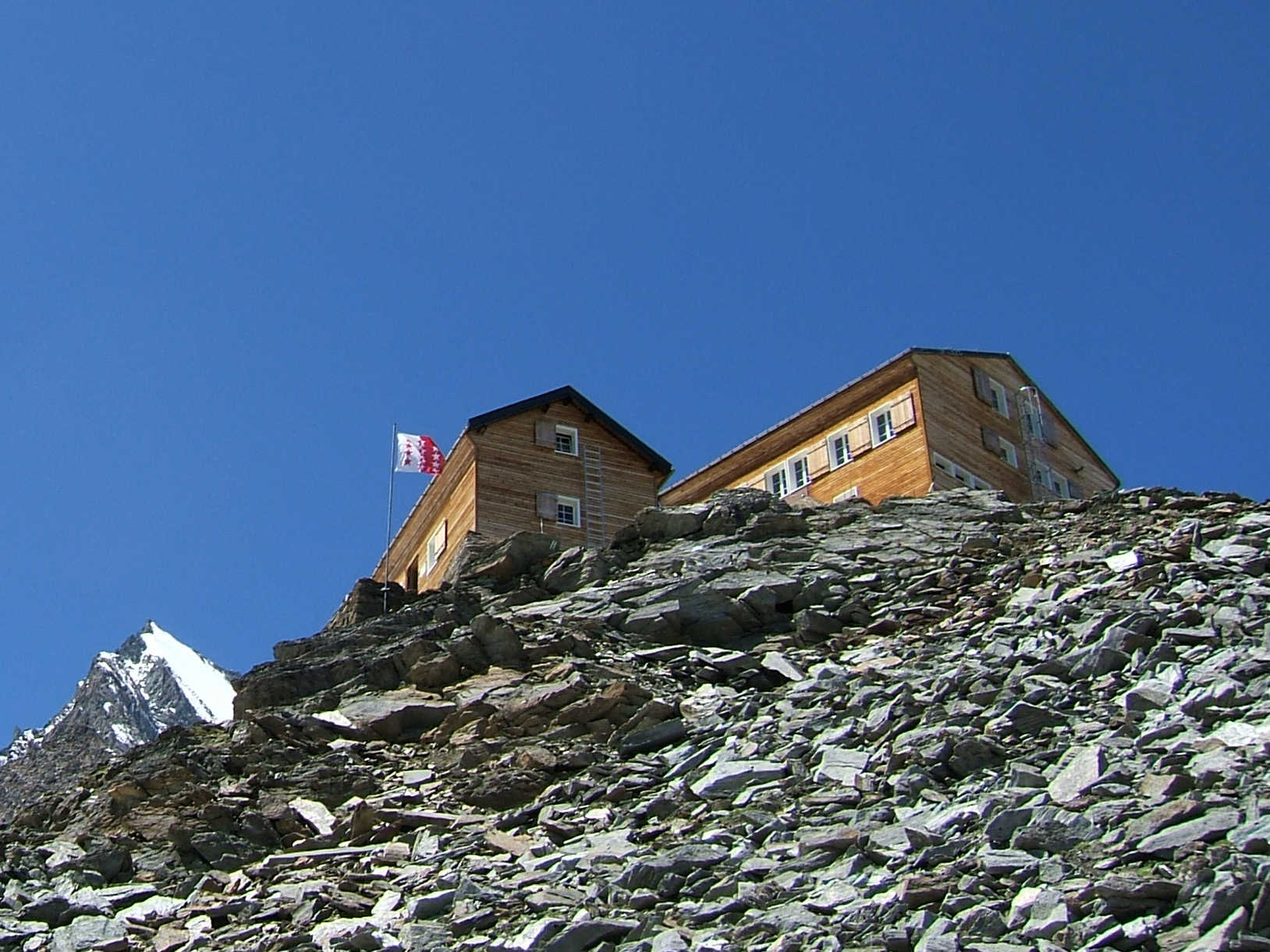
The Mischabel Hut with the Lenzspitze in background

The Mischabel Hut (German: Mischabelhütte) is a mountain hut of the Academic Alpine Club of Zurich, located west of Saas Fee in the canton of Valais. It lies at a height of 3,340 metres (10,960 ft) above sea level near the Hohbalmgletscher glacier, on the eastern flanks of the Dom and the Lenzspitze in the Mischabel group.

The hut is accessible to experienced hikers from Saas Fee (4 hours), with a marked trail and fixed ropes. The Mischabel Hut is used to climb the Lenzspitze, the Nadelhorn and the Hohberghorn.

== See also ==
- List of buildings and structures above 3000 m in Switzerland
