= Joderhorn =

Mountain in Italy

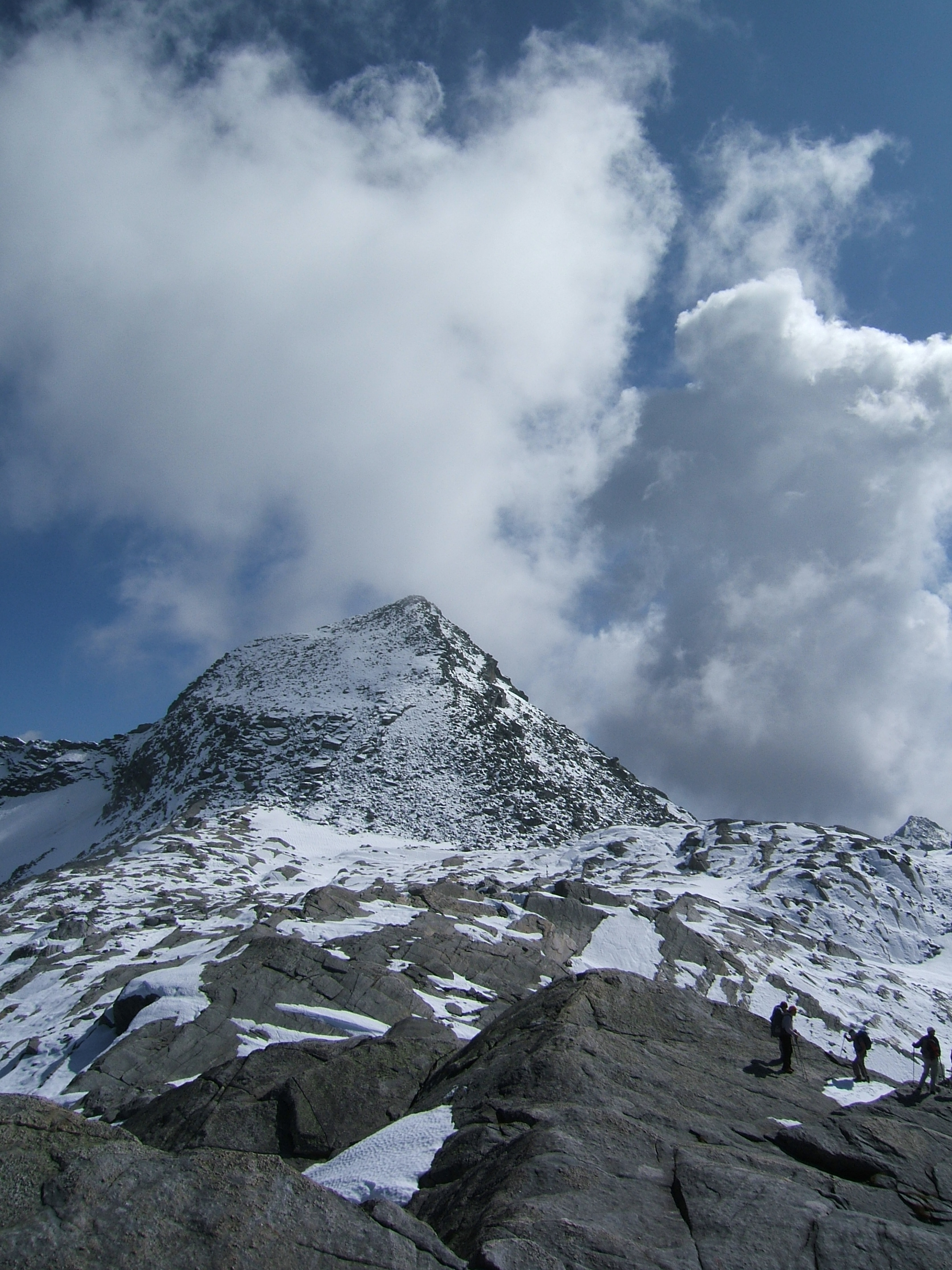
- Joderhorn seen from Monte Moro Pass

Highest point
- Elevation: 3,036 m (9,961 ft)
- Prominence: 190 m (620 ft)
- Isolation: 2.03 km (1.26 mi)
- Coordinates: 45°59′45″N 7°59′21″E

Geography
- Location: Piedmont, Italy; Valais, Switzerland
- Parent range: Pennine Alps

The Joderhorn is a mountain of the Pennine Alps, with an elevation of 3,036 metres (9,961 ft), located on the border between Italy and Switzerland.

Lying south-east of Monte Moro, the Joderhorn is on the boundary between the municipalities of Macugnaga in the Italian Province of Verbano-Cusio-Ossola and Saas Almagell in the Swiss Canton Valais, and can be reached from the Monte Moro Pass.
