= Ulrichshorn =

Mountain in Switzerland

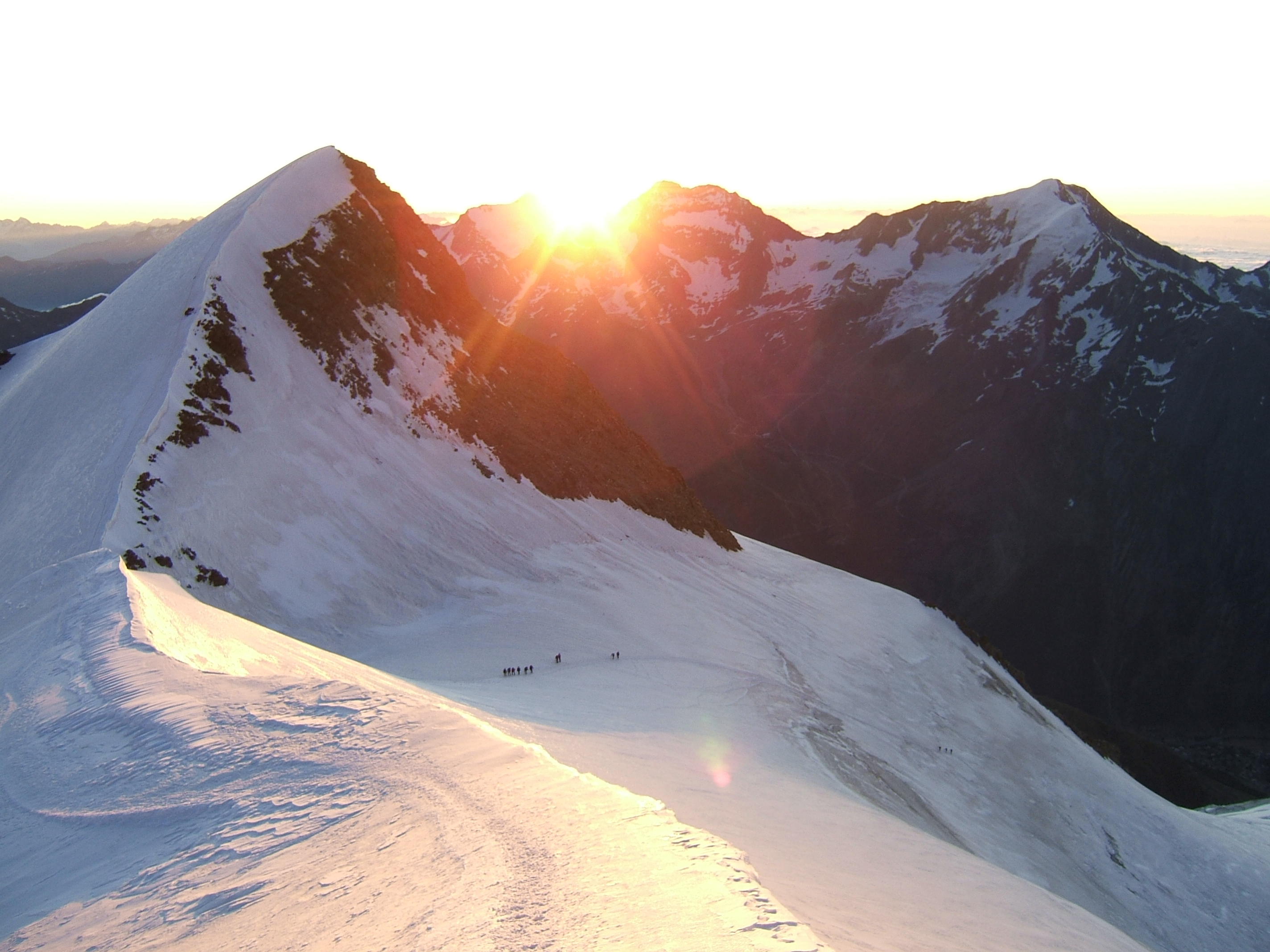
- Ulrichshorn from Southwest at sunrise, from Northeast Ridge of the Nadelhorn

Highest point
- Elevation: 3,925 m (12,877 ft)
- Prominence: 75 m (246 ft)
- Parent peak: Dom
- Coordinates: 46°31′55.4″N 7°58′02.3″E

Geography
- Location within Switzerland
- Location: Valais, Switzerland
- Parent range: Pennine Alps

The Ulrichshorn (3,925 m) is a mountain of the Swiss Pennine Alps, overlooking Saas-Fee in the canton of Valais. It is located north of the Nadelhorn, in the Mischabel range, which lies between the Mattertal and the Saastal.
