= Europa Hut =

Coordinates: 46°06′21″N 7°48′21″E

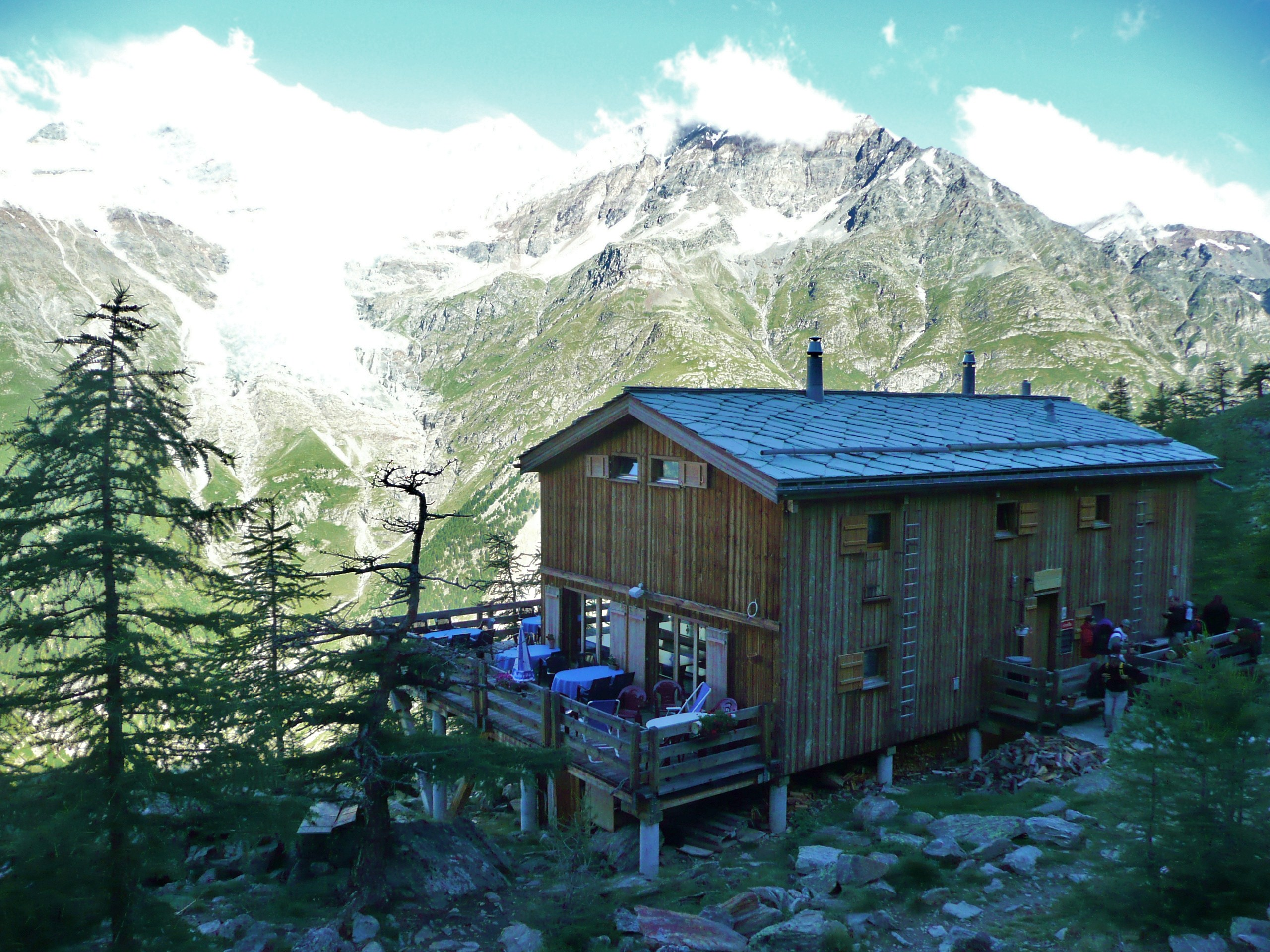
Europa Hut

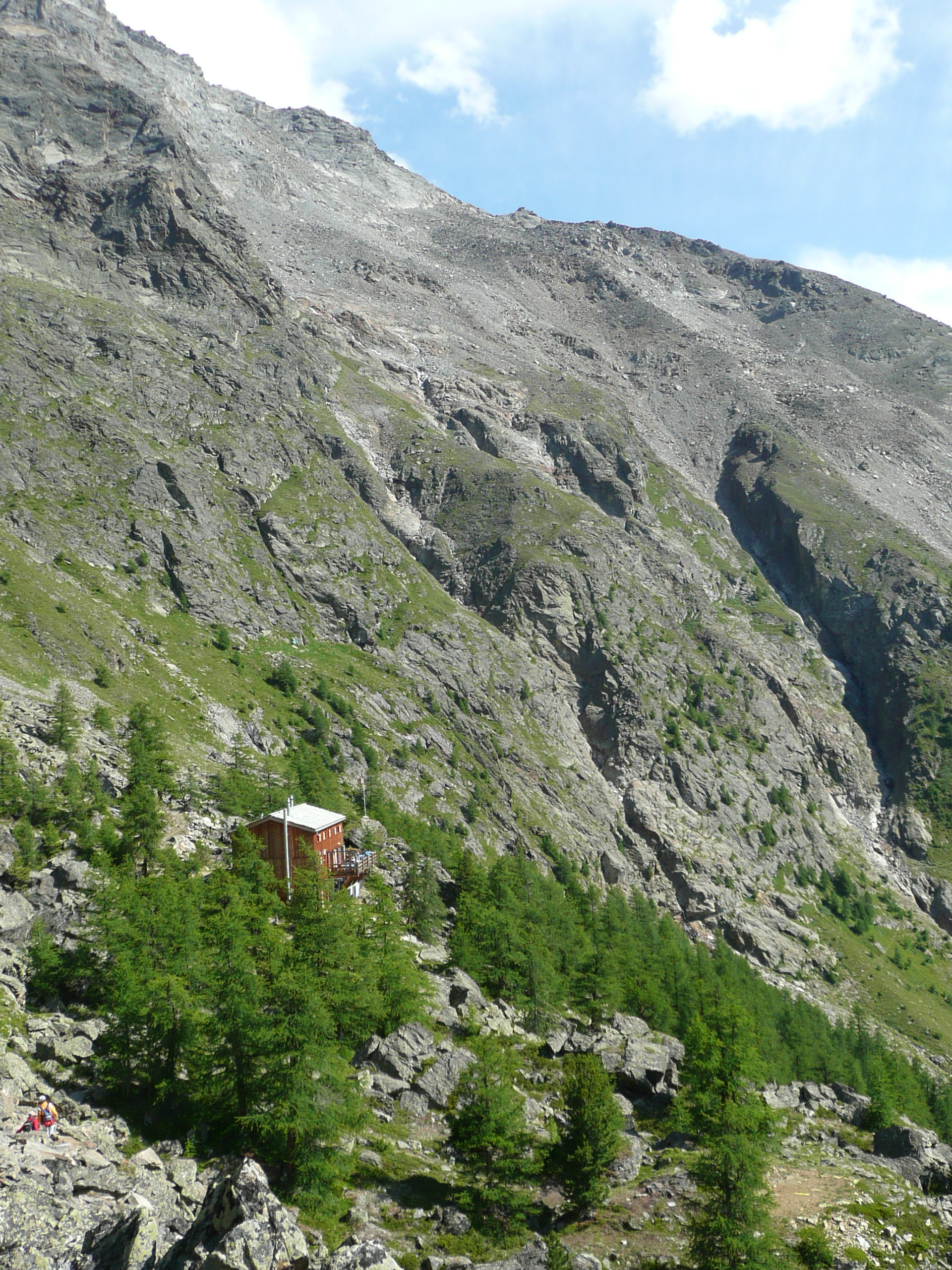
Europa Hut

The Europa Hut (German: Europahütte) is a mountain hut located in the Mattertal above Randa in the Mischabel range at 2,265 m, owned by the Swiss Alpine Club. It lies on the Grächen-Zermatt high trail, called Europaweg (also part of the Monte Rosa Tour). From the hut a trail leads to the Dom Hut, on the normal route to the Dom.

The Europaweg is badly affected by unstable terrain; the entire path is prone to rockfalls and sections are sometimes closed. The section between the Europahütte and Zermatt reopened on 4 July 2010 with the construction of a 230-metre suspension bridge over the Grabengufer ravine, but this has since been closed due to the risk of falling rocks. A new bridge has now replaced the old one and is open to the public. The new Charles Kuonen Bridge is the second-longest hanging pedestrian bridge in the world. The bridge is located around 500 metres southwest of the hut.
