= Stecknadelhorn =

Mountain in Switzerland

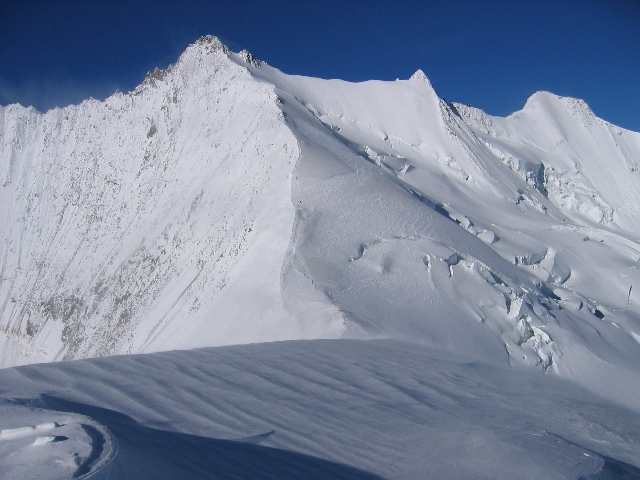
- The Stecknadelhorn (right of centre) between the Nadelhorn (left) and the Hohberghorn (far right)

Highest point
- Elevation: 4,240 m (13,910 ft)
- Prominence: 27 m (89 ft)
- Parent peak: Nadelhorn
- Coordinates: 46°06′41.5″N 7°51′34.8″E

Geography
- Location within Switzerland
- Location: Switzerland
- Parent range: Pennine Alps

Climbing
- First ascent: 8 August 1887 by Oscar Eckenstein and Matthias Zurbriggen
- Easiest route: Basic snow climb

The Stecknadelhorn (4,240 m) is a mountain in the Pennine Alps in Switzerland. It lies on the Nadelgrat, a high-level ridge running roughly north–south above the resort of Saas Fee to the east, and the Mattertal to the west.

It was first climbed by Oscar Eckenstein and Matthias Zurbriggen on 8 August 1887.

The Stecknadelhorn is part of the Mischabel range, which culminates at the Dom (4,546 m).

== See also ==
- List of 4000 metre peaks of the Alps
