= Dom Hut =

Coordinates: 46°06′10.2″N 7°49′03.4″E

View of the Dum Hut from the hiking trail.

The Dom Hut (German: Domhütte) is a mountain hut of the Swiss Alpine Club, located above Randa in the canton of Valais. The hut lies on the western slopes of the Dom, at a height of 2,940 m above sea level, near the bottom of the Festigletscher glacier in the Pennine Alps.

The Dom Hut is mainly used as the starting point of the normal route of the Dom. A trail leads to the hut from Randa, crossing the Europaweg near the Europa Hut, and climbs further to the Festigletscher (3,200 m).
