= Monte Moro Pass =

Alpine pass located on the border between Switzerland and Italy

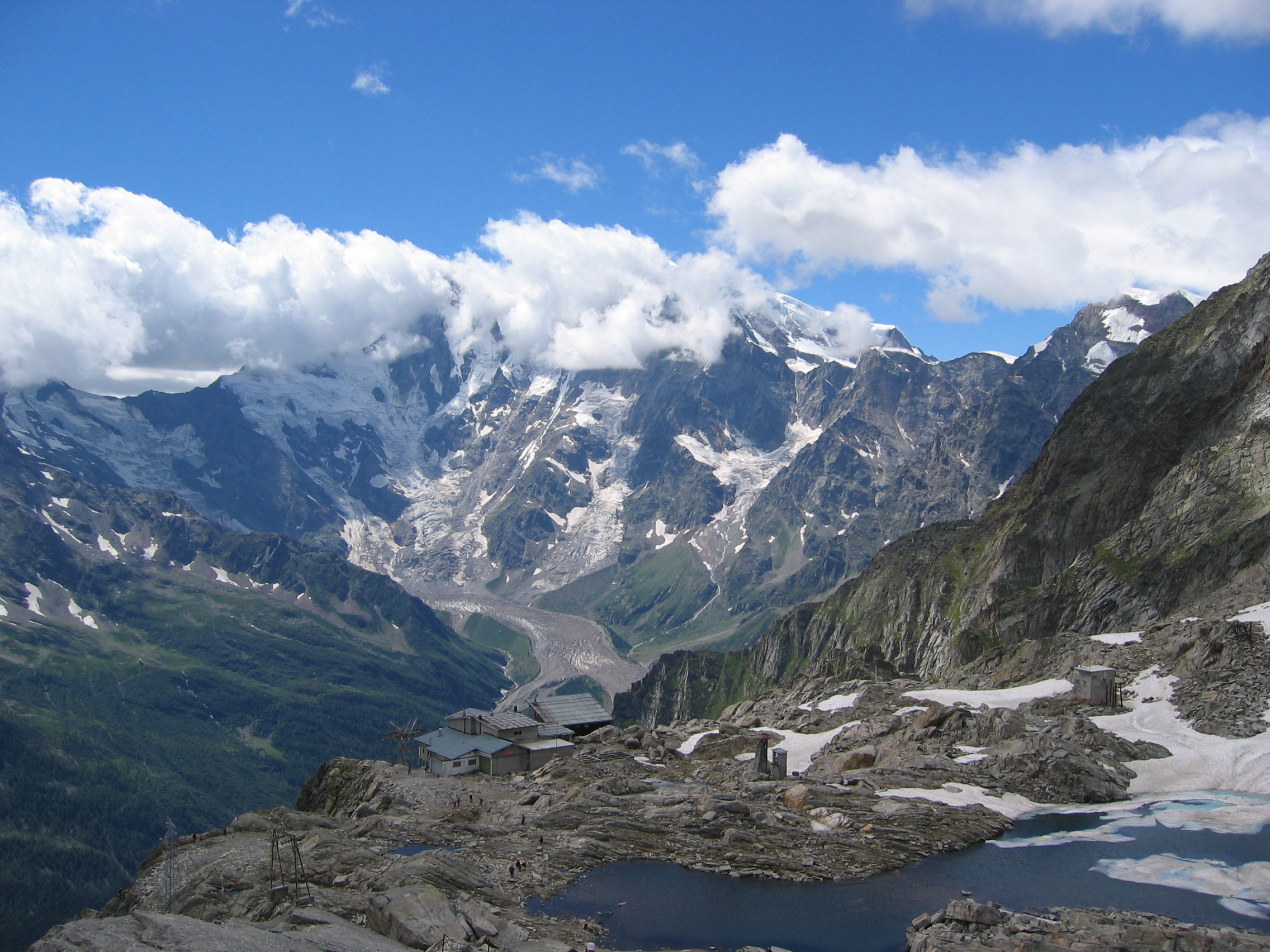
- View of Monte Rosa from the pass

- Location within Alps
- Elevation: 2,853 m (9,360 ft)
- Traversed by: Trail

Third Approach
- Location: Valais, Switzerland; Piedmont, Italy
- Range: Pennine Alps
- Coordinates: 45°59′53″N 7°58′53″E

The Monte Moro Pass (German: Monte-Moro-Pass, Italian: Passo del Monte Moro) is an Alpine pass located on the border between Switzerland and Italy. It connects Saas-Almagell in the Swiss canton of Valais to Macugnaga, Province of Verbano-Cusio-Ossola, in the Italian region of Piedmont. The pass lies at the foot of Monte Moro.

Historically the Monte Moro is an important border crossing between the valleys of Saas and Anzasca. It is traversed by a trail and is one of the highest passes on the Monte Rosa Tour.

The mountain hut Rifugio Oberto Maroli is located just below the pass at an altitude of 2796m.

The pass can be reached using two cable cars from Macugnaga. In winter there are several pistes going down from and ski lifts going up to Monte Moro Pass.
