= Monte Rosa tour =

Hiking trail in the Swiss and Italian Alps

Coordinates: 45°56′12.6″N 7°52′01.4″E

The Monte Rosa Tour is a circular hiking trail through the Swiss and Italian Alps that loops around the Monte Rosa massif (4,634 m) and also encircles the Dom (4,545 m) in the Mischabel range.

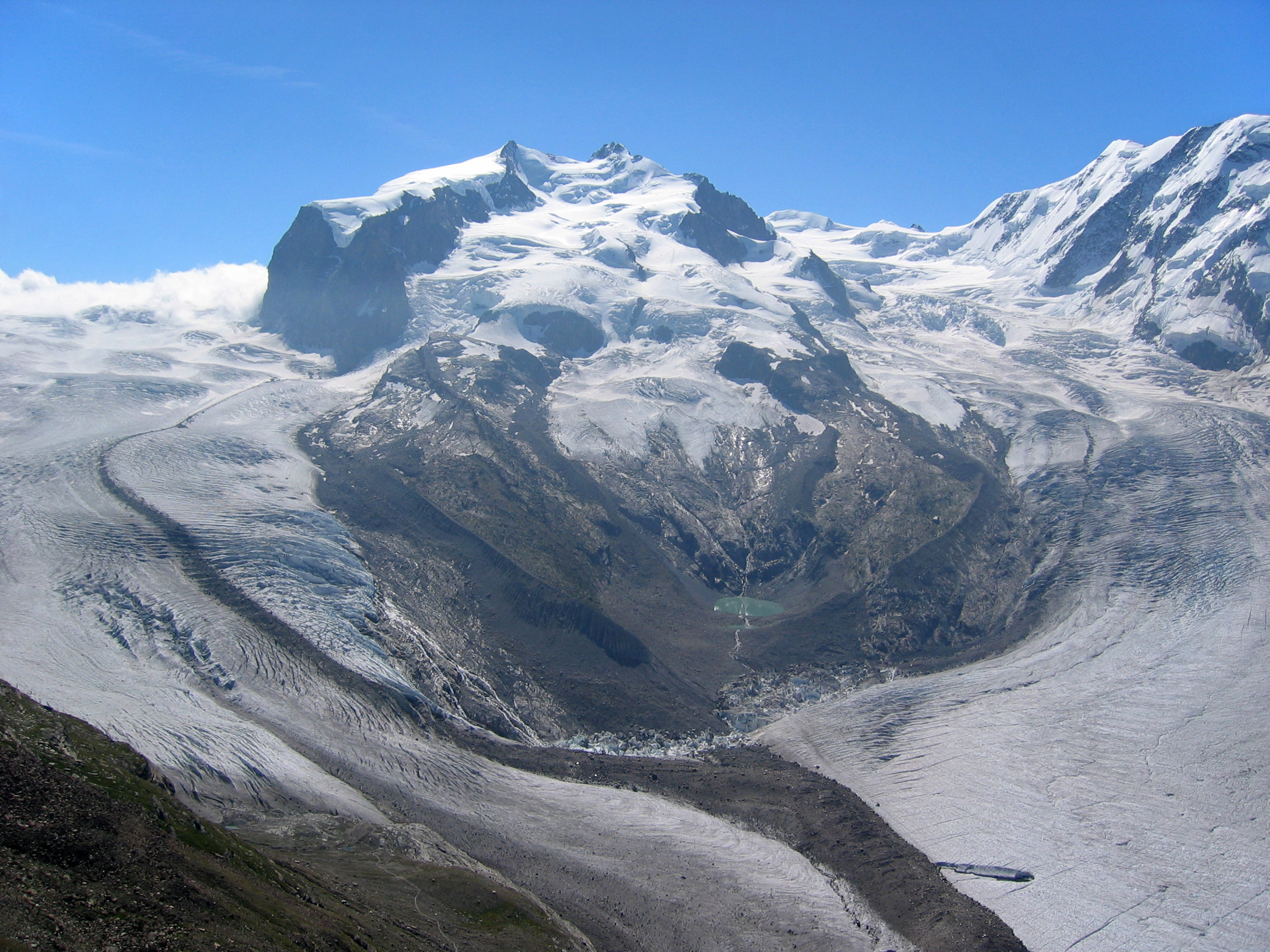
Monte Rosa

Typical overnight stops include Zermatt, the Theodul Pass area (c. 3,301 m), St‑Jacques in the Ayas valley, Gressoney-La-Trinité, Alagna Valsesia, Macugnaga‑Staffa, Saas-Fee, Grächen, and the Europahütte above Randa, reflecting standard clockwise and anti‑clockwise variants on the loop.

The section from Saas-Fee to Grächen is commonly known as the Balfrin Höhenweg (Hannigalp–Saas‑Fee high path), a balcony trail with sustained alpine exposure and views over the Valais 4000ers.

From Grächen to Zermatt, the route follows the Europaweg, a two‑day high traverse past the Europahütte with periodic detours or closures depending on conditions.
