= Charles Kuonen Suspension Bridge =

Charles Kuonen Suspension Bridge (Charles Kuonen Hängebrücke)
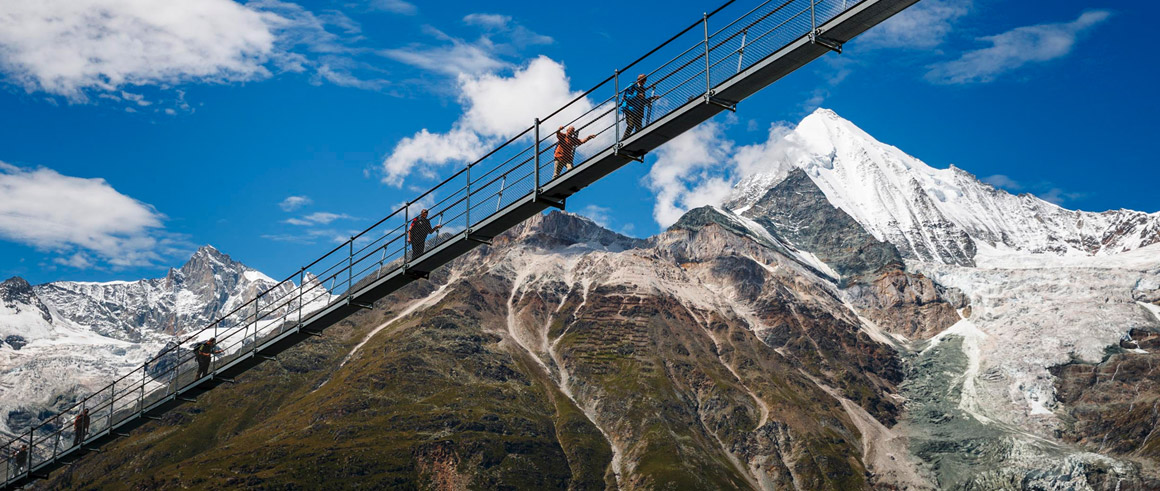
- Coordinates: 46°06′0.14″N 7°48′11.5″E
- Crosses: Grabengufer ravine
- Locale: Randa, Switzerland

Characteristics
- Design: Hanging bridge
- Total length: 494 metres (1,621 ft)
- Width: 65 centimetres (26 in)

History
- Opened: July 29, 2017

At the time of its opening in July 2017, the Charles Kuonen Suspension Bridge was the longest pedestrian suspension bridge in the world. It is located in Randa, Switzerland and replaced the defunct Europabrücke, which had been damaged by a rock slide. The bridge is part of the Europaweg.

== History ==
The bridge officially opened on 29 July 2017, drawing a crowd of around 250 to 300 attendees, including local residents and tourists. It was named after Charles Kuonen, a psychologist and co-owner of a Swiss winery, who contributed as the primary private sponsor of the project. The event also marked the reopening of the Europaweg trail segment, a popular high-altitude hiking route between Grächen and Zermatt.

== Design and Construction ==
The Charles Kuonen Bridge is a hanging-type suspension bridge that measures 494 metres in length and 65 centimetres in width, suspended up to 85 metres above the Grabengufer ravine in the Mattertal valley near Randa, Switzerland. The bridge is constructed using steel cables that weigh a total of eight tonnes, and incorporates a specialized oscillation damping system designed to minimize swaying under wind or pedestrian load.

Its deck consists of transparent wire mesh grating, allowing hikers to look directly down into the ravine below. The bridge remains stable in use, despite its narrow width of 65 centimetres.

The bridge was built over a period of approximately two and a half months by the Swiss company Swissrope, using specialized assembly sleds. The project was coordinated in part by a local councilor in Randa.

== See also ==
- Arouca 516
- Europa Hut, located around 500 metres (1,600 ft) northeast of the bridge
- List of notable pedestrian bridges
- Swiss Alps
