= Hohberghorn =

Mountain in Switzerland

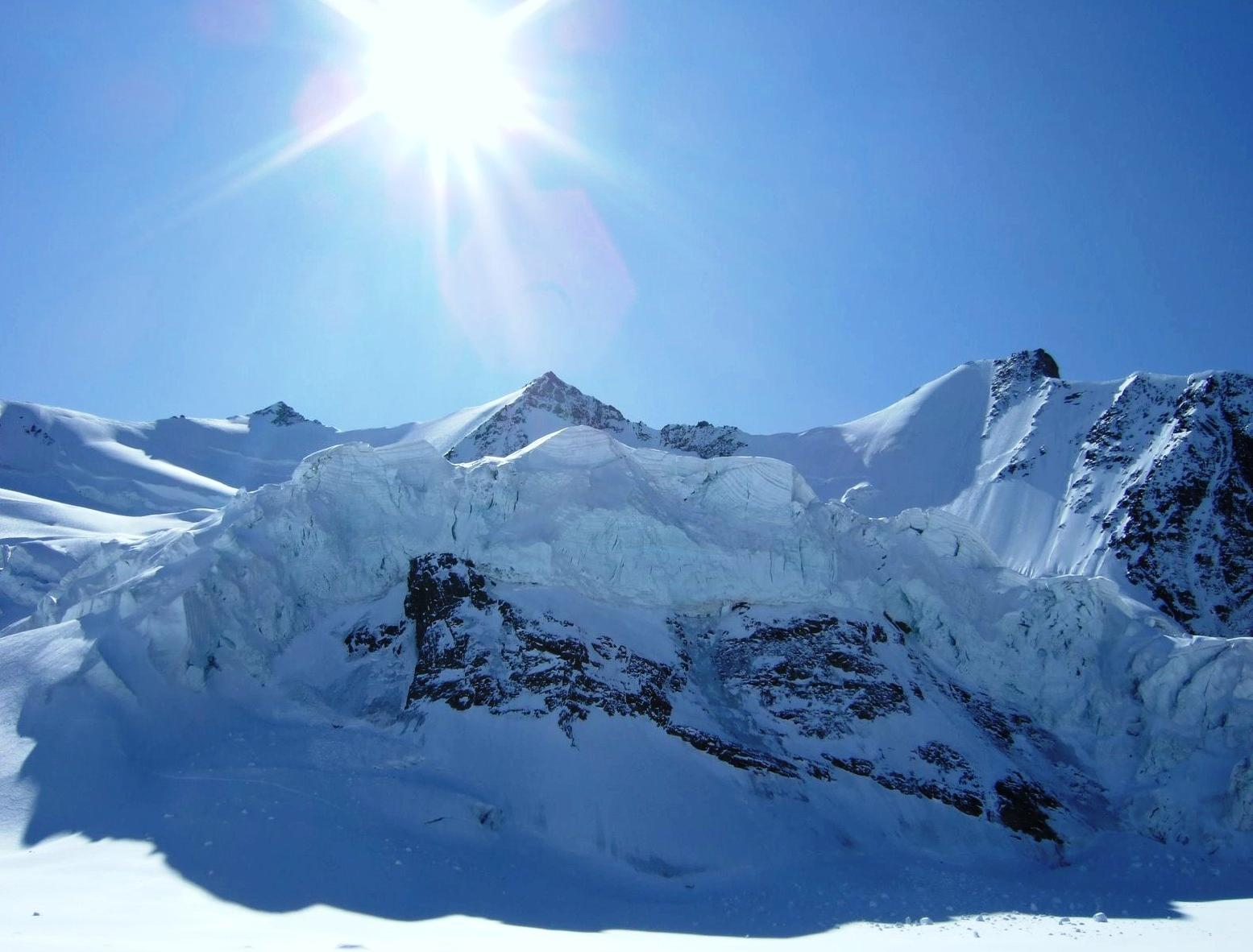
- The Hohberghorn (right), with the Stecknadelhorn (centre) and the Nadelhorn (left), from the north side

Highest point
- Elevation: 4,218 m (13,839 ft)
- Prominence: 76 m (249 ft)
- Parent peak: Nadelhorn
- Coordinates: 46°06′45.7″N 7°51′13.9″E

Geography
- Location within Switzerland
- Location: Valais, Switzerland
- Parent range: Pennine Alps

Climbing
- First ascent: August 1869 by R. B. Heathcote, Franz Biner, Peter Perren and Peter Taugwalder
- Easiest route: Basic snow climb

The Hohberghorn (4,218 m) is a mountain in the Pennine Alps in Switzerland. It lies towards the northern end of the Nadelgrat, a high-level ridge running roughly north–south, north of the Dom, above the resort of Saas-Fee to the east, and the Mattertal to the west.

It was first climbed by R. B. Heathcote, with guides Franz Biner, Peter Perren and Peter Taugwalder in August 1869, via the west gully above the Hohberg Glacier to the Stecknadeljoch.

Its north-east face, not as long or as steep as that on the neighbouring Lenzspitze, is 320 m and at an average angle of 50 degrees, and might be considered as excellent training for the latter.

== See also ==
- List of 4000 metre peaks of the Alps
