= Monte Moro =

Mountain in Italy and Switzerland

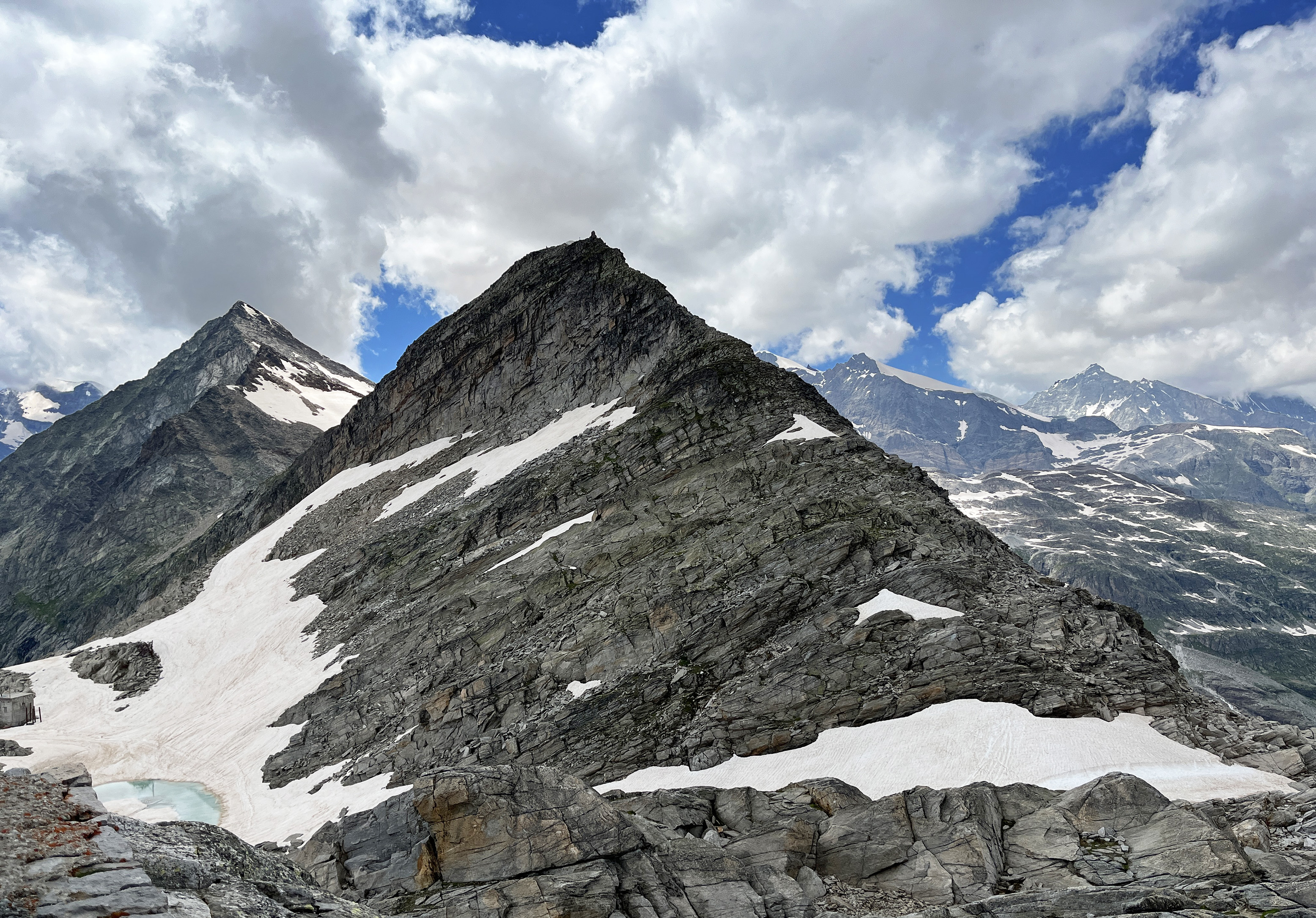

Highest point
- Elevation: 2,985 m (9,793 ft)
- Prominence: 79 m (259 ft)
- Coordinates: 45°59′57.1″N 7°58′29.9″E

Geography
- Location within Alps
- Location: Valais, Switzerland; Piedmont, Italy
- Parent range: Pennine Alps

Monte Moro is a mountain of the Pennine Alps, located on the Swiss-Italian border. It lies west of the Monte Moro Pass.
