= Lenzspitze =

Mountain in Switzerland

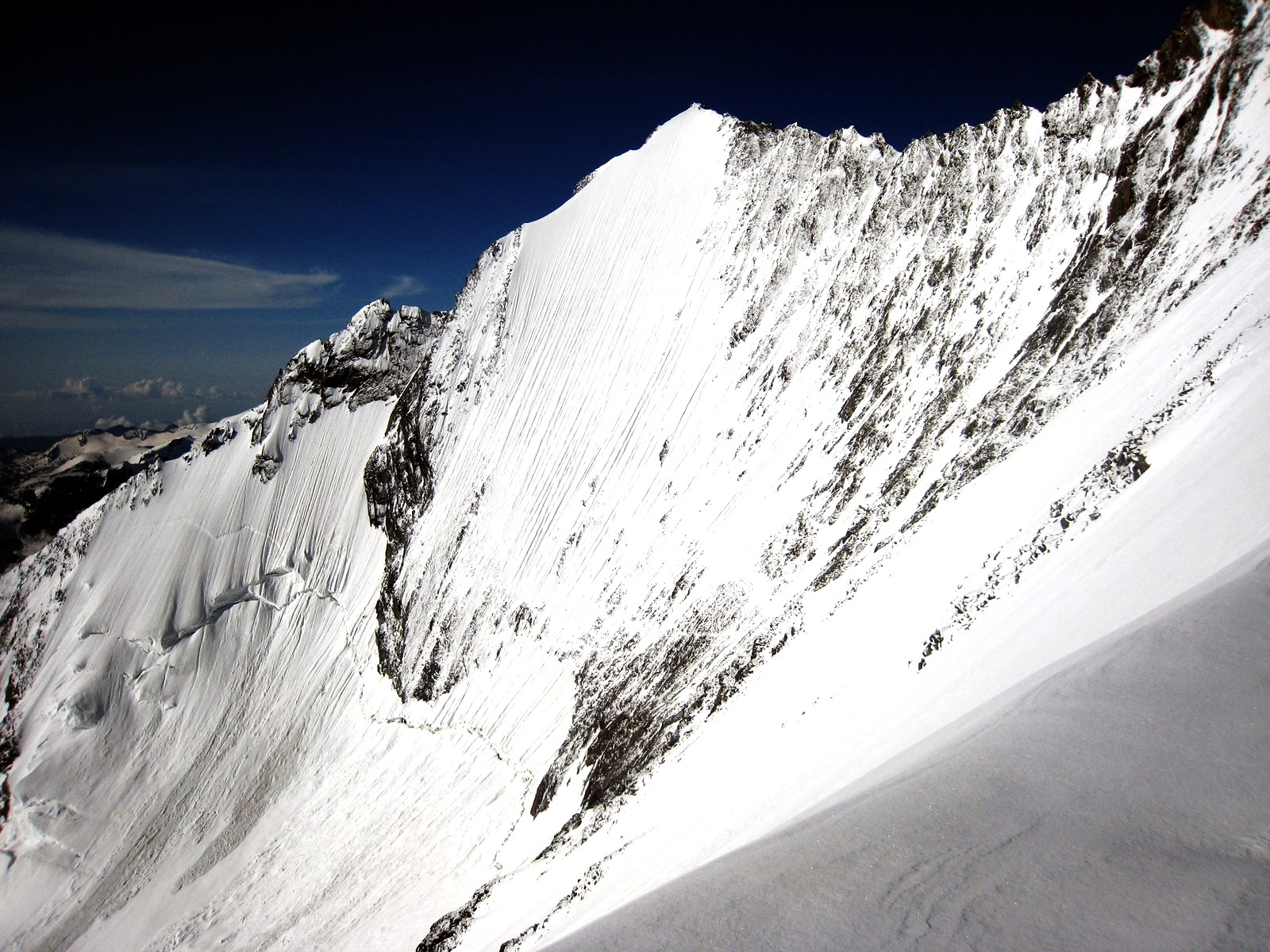
- Northeast face

Highest point
- Elevation: 4,293 m (14,085 ft)
- Prominence: 86 m ↓ Nadeljoch
- Parent peak: Nadelhorn
- Isolation: 0.61 km → Nadelhorn
- Coordinates: 46°06′16.7″N 7°52′06.4″E

Geography
- Location within Switzerland
- Location: Switzerland
- Parent range: Pennine Alps

Climbing
- First ascent: August 1870 by Clinton Thomas Dent, Alexander Burgener and Franz Burgener
- Easiest route: South-west ridge (west flank) Mixed at PD

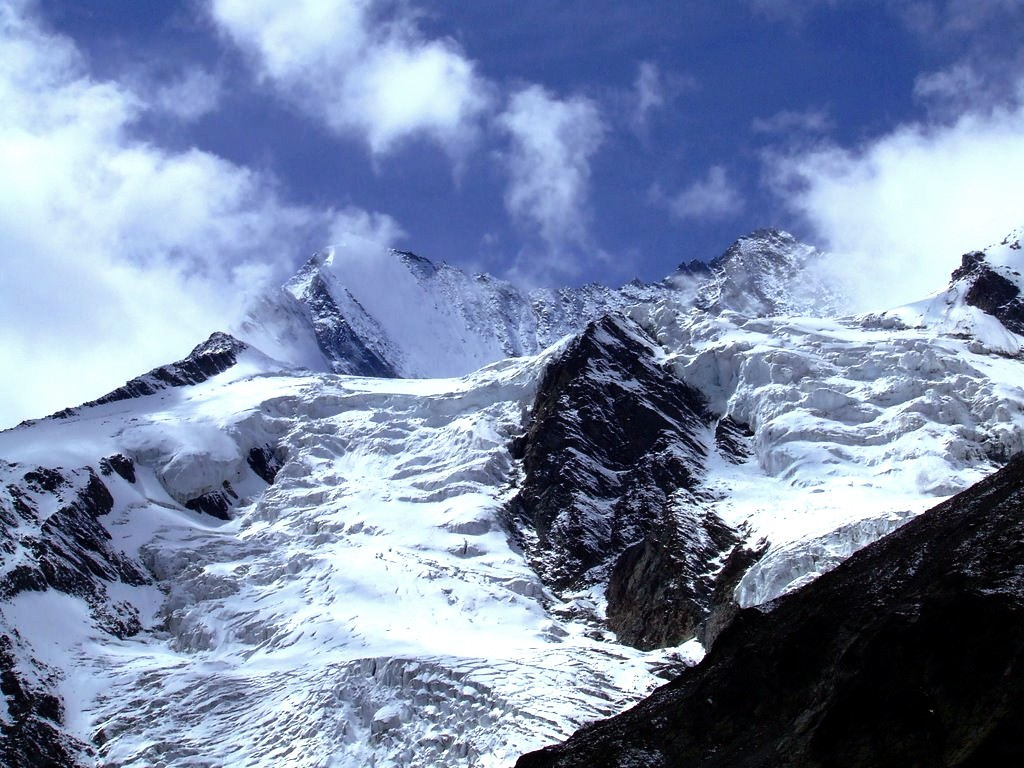
Lenzspitze and Nadelhorn

The Lenzspitze is a 4,293-metre (14,085 ft) mountain in the Pennine Alps in Switzerland. It is the southernmost peak on the Nadelgrat, a high-level ridge running roughly north–south, north of Dom in the Mischabel range, above the resort of Saas Fee to the east, and the Mattertal to the west.

== Ascent ==
It was first climbed in August 1870 by Clinton Thomas Dent with guide Alexander Burgener and a porter, Franz Burgener, by the north-east face to the Nadeljoch and then the north-west ridge to the summit. This route is rarely used today.

The east-north-east ridge starts at the Mischabel Hut. This ridge was first climbed on 3 August 1882 by William Woodman Goodman with guides Ambros Supersaxo and Theodor Andenmatten.

Its north-east face is a classic ice climb, comprising a 500-metre (1,600 ft) wall of ice or neve at an angle of up to 56 degrees, first climbed by Dietrich von Bethmann-Hollweg with Oskar and Othmar Supersaxo on 7 July 1911. This face was descended on skis by Heini Holzer on 22 July 1972.

== See also ==
- List of 4000 metre peaks of the Alps

== Bibliography ==
- Dumler, Helmut; Burkhardt, Willi P. (1994). The High Mountains of the Alps. London: Diadem.
