= Dom (mountain) =

Mountain in the Pennine Alps, Switzerland

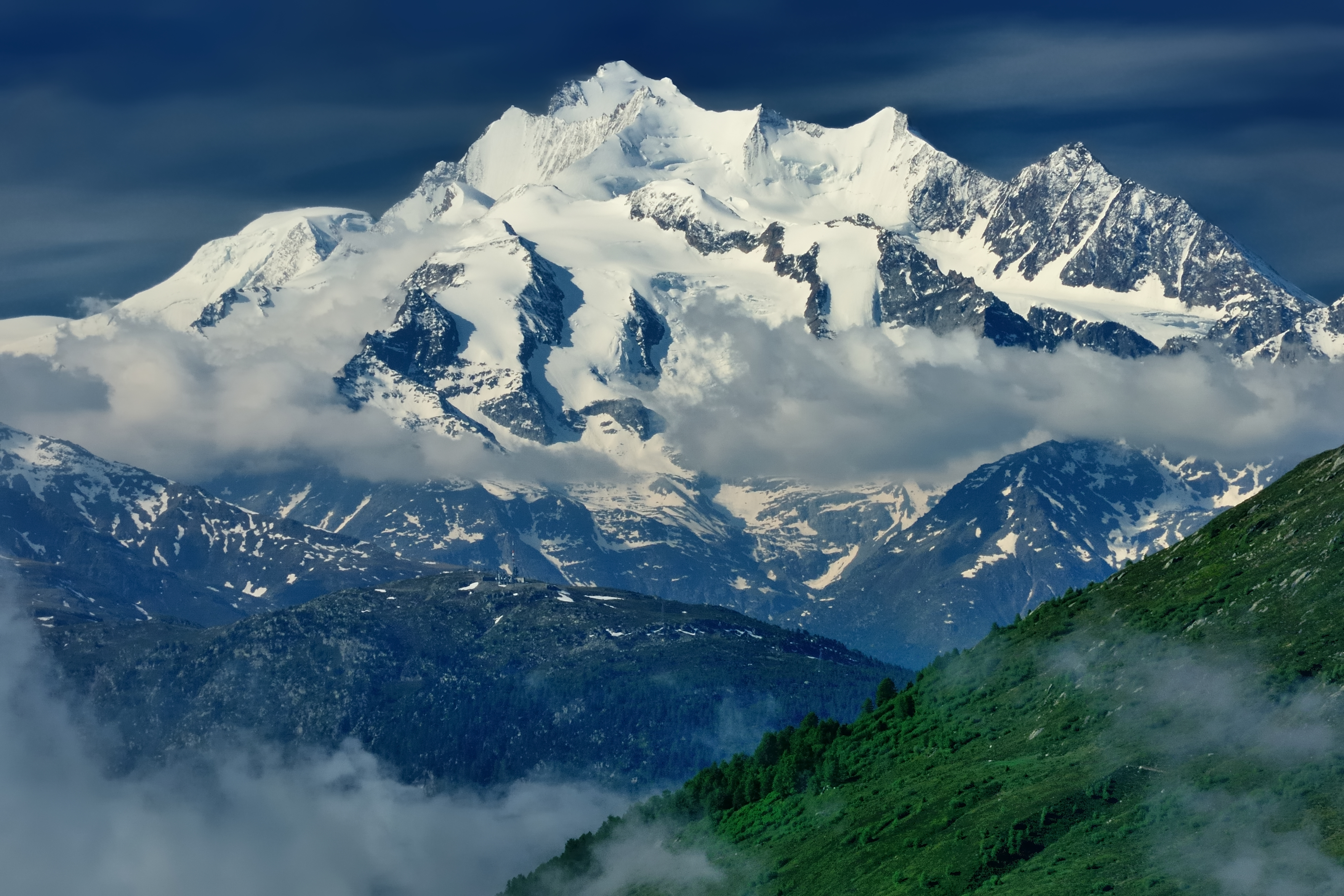
- The north side of the Dom and the Mischabel massif

Highest point
- Elevation: 4,546 m (14,915 ft)
- Prominence: 1057 m ↓ Neues Weisstor
- Parent peak: Monte Rosa
- Isolation: 16.8 km → Nordend
- Listing: Seven Third Summits
- Coordinates: 46°05′42″N 7°51′36″E

Geography
- Location within Switzerland
- Dom location and nearby peaks and huts Location in Switzerland
- Location: Valais, Switzerland
- Parent range: Pennine Alps
- Topo map: Swisstopo 1328 Randa

Climbing
- First ascent: 1858 by John Llewelyn Davies guided by Johann Zumtaugwald, Johann Krönig and Hieronymous Brantschen
- Easiest route: North flank (PD)

The Dom is a mountain of the Pennine Alps, located between Randa and Saas-Fee in the canton of Valais in Switzerland. With a height of 4,546 m (14,915 ft), it is the seventh highest summit in the Alps, overall. Based on prominence, it can be regarded as the third highest mountain in the Alps, and the second highest in Switzerland, after Monte Rosa. The Dom is the main summit of the Mischabel group (German: Mischabelhörner), which is the highest massif lying entirely in Switzerland.

The Dom is noteworthy for its 'normal route' of ascent having the greatest vertical height gain of all the alpine 4000 metre peaks, and none of that route's 3,100 metres of height can be achieved using mechanical means.

Although Dom is a German cognate for 'dome', it can also mean 'cathedral' and the mountain is named after Canon Berchtold of Sitten cathedral, the first person to survey the vicinity.

The former name Mischabel comes from an ancient German dialect term for pitchfork, as the highest peaks of the massif stand close to each other.

== Geographical setting ==
The Dom is the culminating point of a chain running from the Schwarzberghorn on the south, at the intersection with the main chain of the Alps (Alpine watershed), to the Distelhorn on the north and ending above the town of Stalden. The chain lies entirely in the district of Visp.

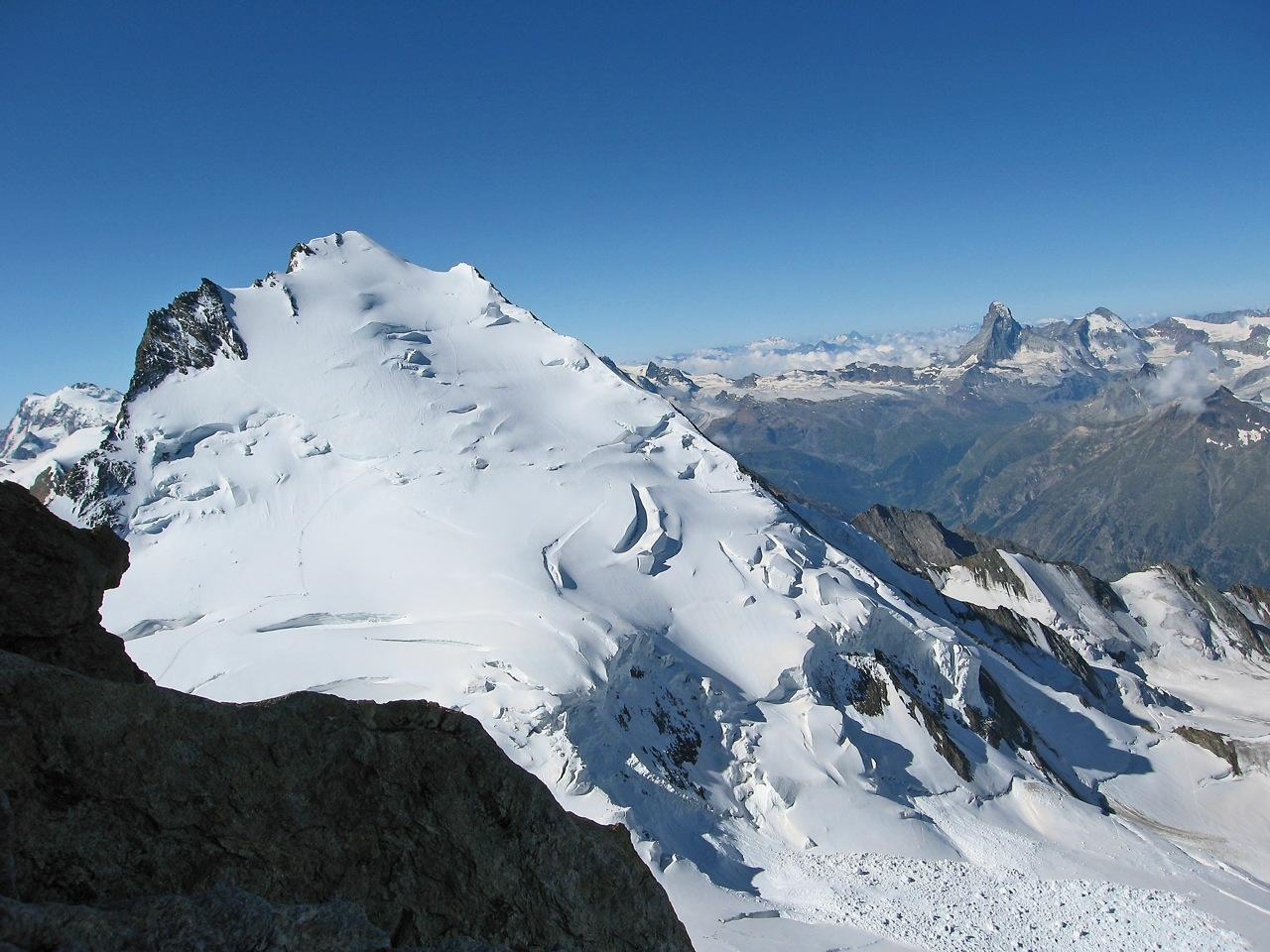
The Dom from the Nadelgrat

The two valleys separated by the range are the Mattertal on the west and the Saastal on the east. The towns of Randa and Saas-Fee lie both six kilometres from the summit (to the west and the east, respectively). The elevation difference between the summit and the valley floor is 3,150 metres on the west side (Randa) and 3,000 metres on the east side (Saas-Grund). On the Mattertal side, the Dom faces the almost equally high Weisshorn and, on the Saastal side, it faces the Weissmies. The Dom is the highest point of the Saastal and the second highest mountain of the Mattertal after Monte Rosa.

Since the Dom is not on the main Alpine chain, the rivers flowing on both the west and east side of the massif end up in the same major river, the Rhone, through the Mattervispa and the Saaservispa. The Dom is the highest mountain in the Alps with this peculiarity.

The Mischabel group includes many subsidiary summits above 4,000 metres. To the north lies the Nadelgrat, composed of the Lenzspitze, the Nadelhorn, the Stecknadelhorn, the Hohberghorn and the Dürrenhorn. The Nadelgrat is easily visible from the north and gives the massif its characteristic pitchfork appearance. The second highest peak of the massif, the Täschhorn to the south, culminates at 4,491 metres, and south of it, is the characteristically flat summit of the Alphubel. In total, eight summits above 4,000 metres make up the Mischabel massif. Other important peaks of the massif are the Ulrichshorn and the Balfrin. The Dom has a western shoulder (4,479 m) and an eastern shoulder (4,468 m).

Generally, areas above 3,000 metres are covered by glaciers, the two largest being the Ried Glacier situated at the foot of the Nadelgrat and the Fee Glacier, at the foot of the Dom itself, below the east face.

== Geology ==
The massif is almost entirely composed of gneiss from the Siviez-Mischabel nappe. The latter is part of the Briançonnais microcontinent and is located in the Penninic nappes.

== Climbing history ==
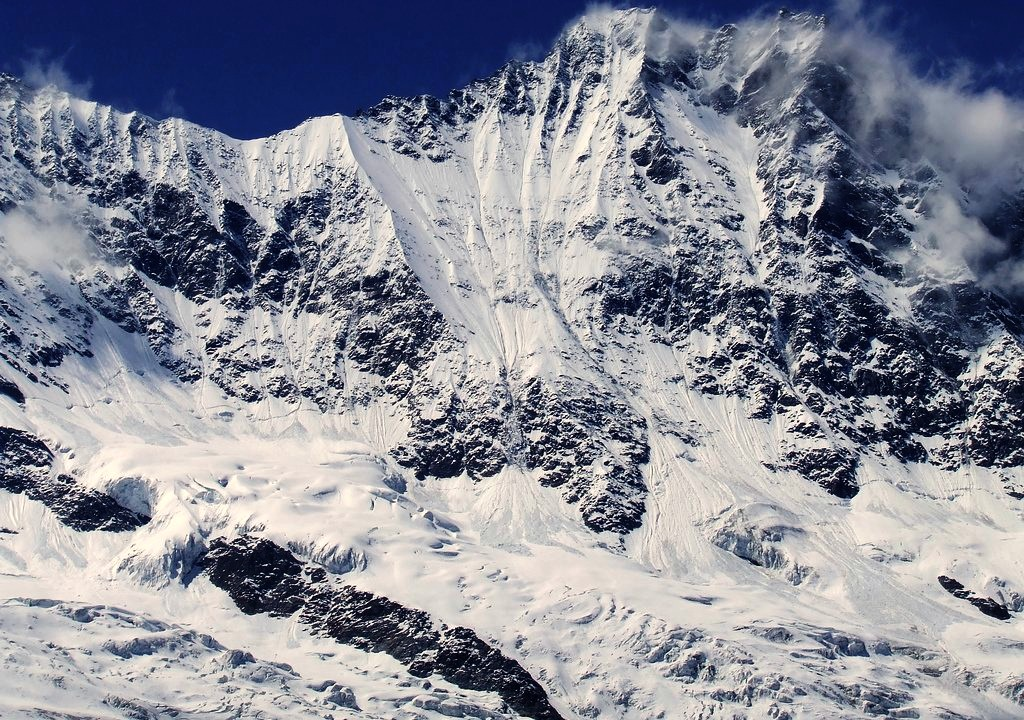
East face above the Fee Glacier

The first ascent of the Dom was made on 11 September 1858. It was reached via the Festigrat (north-west ridge) by John Llewelyn Davies with guides Johann Zumtaugwald, Johann Krönig and Hieronymous Brantschen. Davies published an account of his ascent in Peaks, Passes and Glaciers.

The first ascent of the western ridge (above the Festikinlücke) was made in 1879 by two parties. One comprised Mrs E. P. Jackson with her guides Aloys Pollinger, Peter Josef Truffer and Josef Biner. The second consisted of Percy Thomas with Josef Imboden and Josef Lengen. They bypassed the upper section and traversed the west face to join the upper part of the Festigrat before arriving to the summit. The first complete ascent on the entire western ridge was made later in 1882 by Paul Güssfeldt and guides Alexander Burgener and Benedict Venetz.

The direct route on the west face (50° ice slope, TD-) was first ascended in 1962.

The 1000-metre-high east face above Saas-Fee was climbed in 1875 by Johann Petrus, along with his clients Alfred and Walter Puckle, and a local hunter, Lorenz Noti.

A route on the south face was first made in August 1906 by Geoffrey Winthrop Young and R. G. Major, with the guides Josef Knubel and Gabriel Lochmatter of St. Niklaus in the canton Valais. According to Young it was more dangerous than the south-west face of the nearby Täschhorn, which they had climbed two weeks earlier.

On 18 June 1917, Arnold Lunn, a pioneer ski mountaineer, and Josef Knubel of St. Niklaus in the canton Valais made the first ski ascent of the Dom, by the Hohberg Glacier (north flank).

== Climbing routes and huts ==
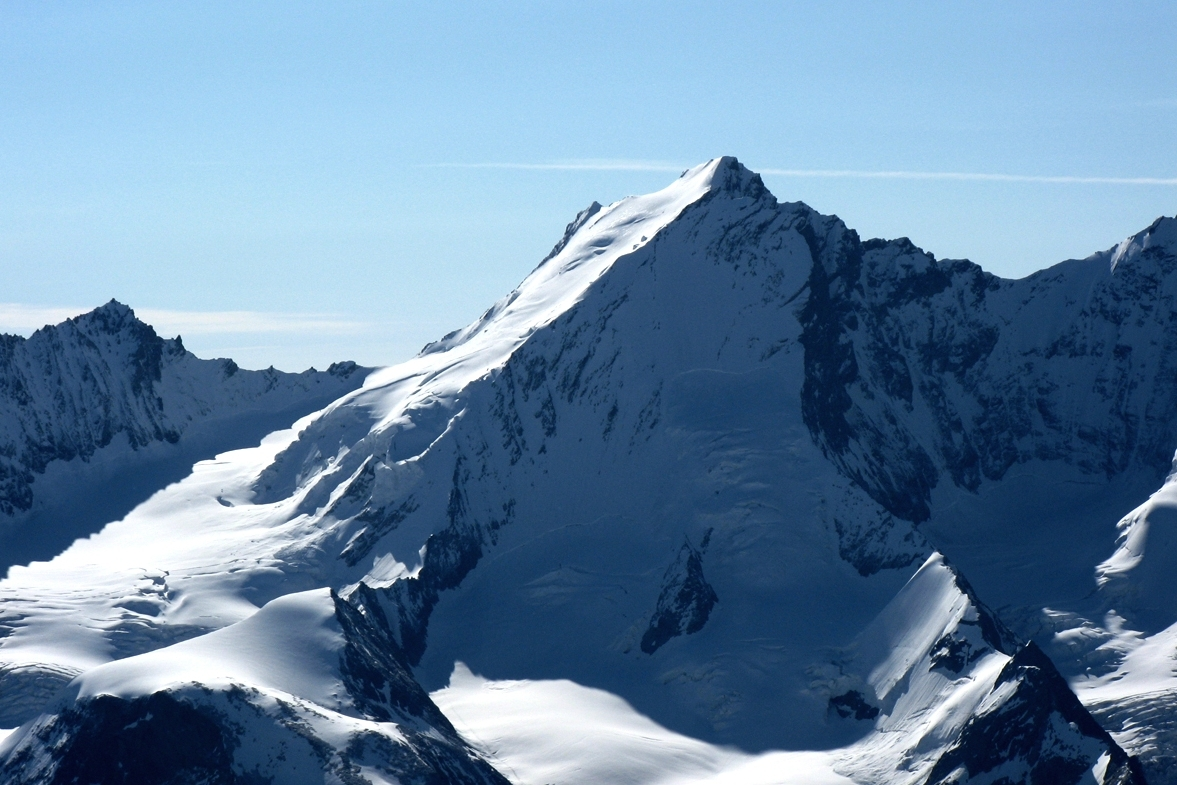
The west side of the Dom

Climbing the Dom by its normal route is a relatively straightforward, but nevertheless long and somewhat arduous 3,100-metre ascent on foot from the valley, and taking 6 hours to the summit from the Dom Hut. The route is graded as PD- on the French adjectival climbing scale. This route has been described in the mountaineering literature as "something of a snow trudge". The only mechanical means of access is located in the Saas-Fee area, on the east side of the mountain, from which all the routes to the Dom are much harder.

The easiest way to the summit starts from Randa, where there is a railway station (1,407 m) served by the Matterhorn Gotthard Bahn. From Randa a trail leads to the Dom Hut (2,940 m), which also crosses the Europaweg near the Europa Hut. Climbing the mountain requires an overnight stay at the Dom Hut. The normal route starts from the hut and goes on the Festigletscher glacier towards the Festijoch (3,720 m). It then follows the Hohberggletscher glacier to the summit above the north face.

An alternative route is provided by the Festigrat, which is the Dom's north-western ridge. It goes directly from the Festijoch to the summit, and is preferred by climbers who wish to avoid the long slopes of the north flank. In good conditions it is graded at PD/PD+. However, its upper section can be treacherous in icy conditions, in which case the north flank approach is better.

=== Domgrat ===
The summit of the Dom can also be reached from the south by the classic and exposed 'Täsch-Dom traverse'. This is a very long, committing and challenging mountaineering route which has been described as "one of the most demanding ridge grandes courses in the Alps". This route (via the south ridge or Domgrat), first requires an ascent of the adjacent Täschhorn - most easily attained from the Mischabel Bivouac Hut perched on Mishabeljoch. From there, an ascent of the Täschhorn's south-southeast ridge (Mischabelgrat, grade AD, III) is made in 4 to 5 hours. The descent from the Täschhorn to the Domjoch (4,282m) is on steep, slabby and sometimes icy rock, taking 2–3 hours, followed by a further 2–3 hours ascent of the rocky crest of the Domgrat (Grade D, III+) before the Dom's summit cross is finally reached after some 8 to 11 hours of sustained climbing in total, followed by a long but simple descent of the 'normal route' to reach the Dom Hut.

== Highest flowering plant in Europe ==
In the late 1970s, mountain guide brothers Pierre and Grégoire Nicollier discovered a Two-flowered Stonecrop (Saxifraga biflora) about a hundred meters below the summit, on the southern ridge of the Dom. This caused a sensation as scientists believed it to be the highest flowering plant ever found in Europe. However, in subsequent climbs of the southerly Taeschhorn-Dom-Ridge, the plant could no longer be located, but a new record holder was found: an opposite-leaved saxifrage (Saxifraga oppositifolia), which thrived and bloomed on the same ridge, about 40 meters below the summit. Mountain guide Jürg Anderegg documented this with pictures in 2011, and botanist Christian Körner from the University of Basel published it in the specialist journal Alpine Botany.

Since the location is difficult to access, documentation remained scarce, and the condition of the plant was uncertain. As part of an art project, Swiss artist Sandro Steudler, together with mountain guide Alexander Kleinheinz and alpine photographer Caroline Fink, set out in July 2023 to search for the plant. Despite challenging conditions and snow on the ridge, Alexander Kleinheinz succeeded in finding the plant and placing a temperature sensor beneath it, which had been given to them beforehand by Christian Körner; Caroline Fink documented the location photographically. The sensor will record the temperature under the stonecrop until 2026. It is believed that this saxifrage grows in the coldest location in the world where a flowering plant has been found so far.

== Views from the normal route ==
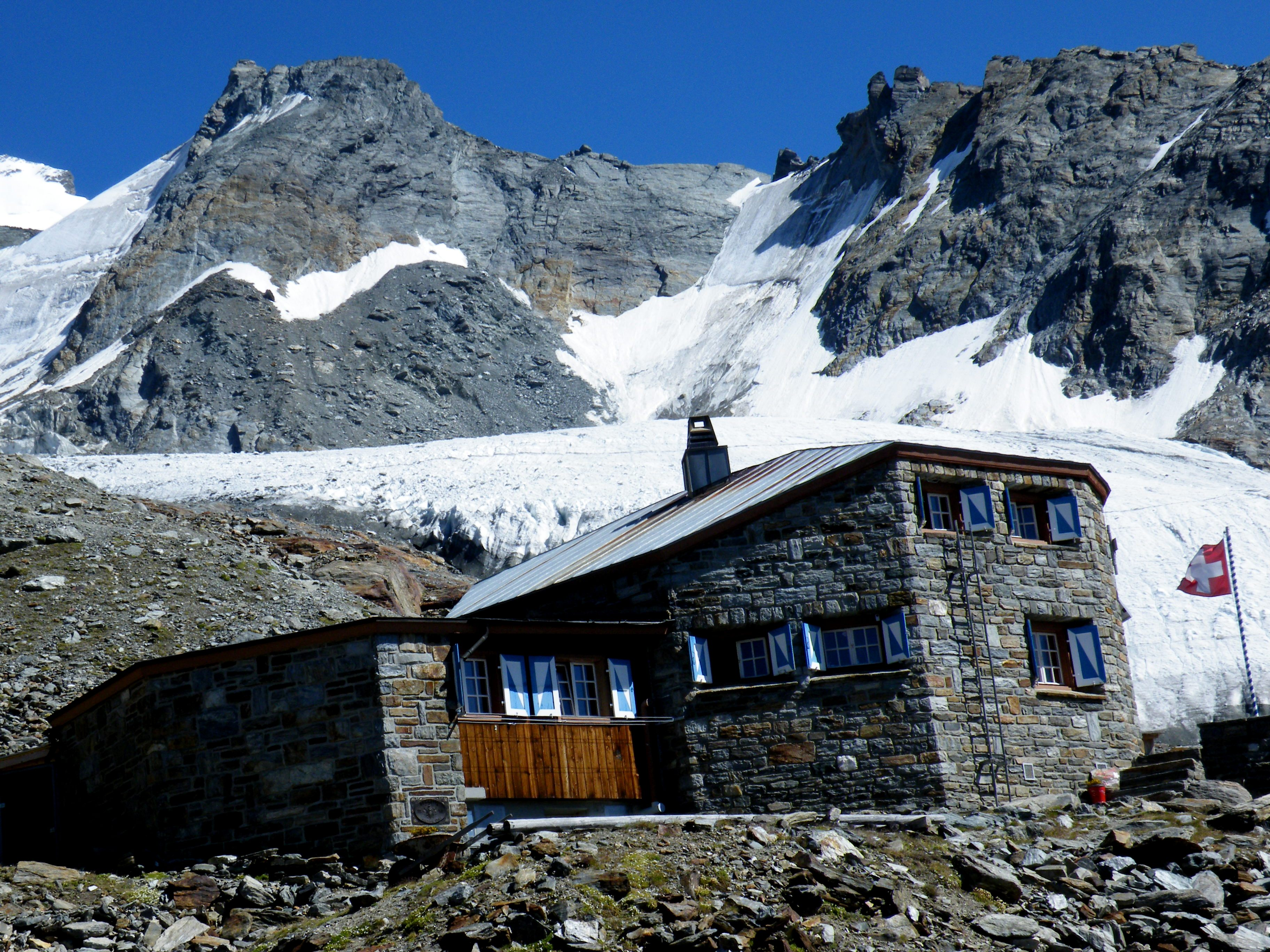
Dom hut

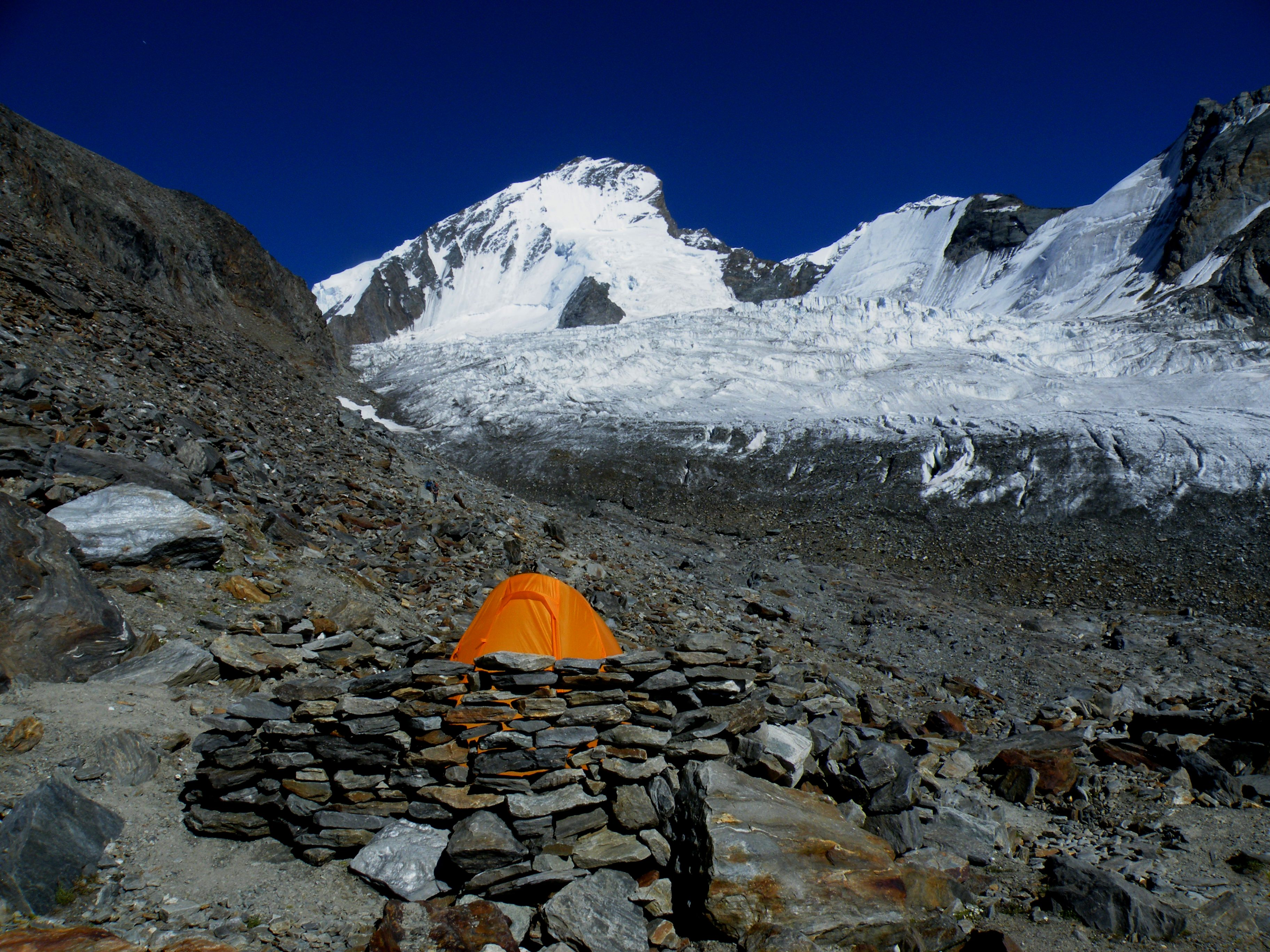
The Dom from above the hut with the Festigletscher glacier

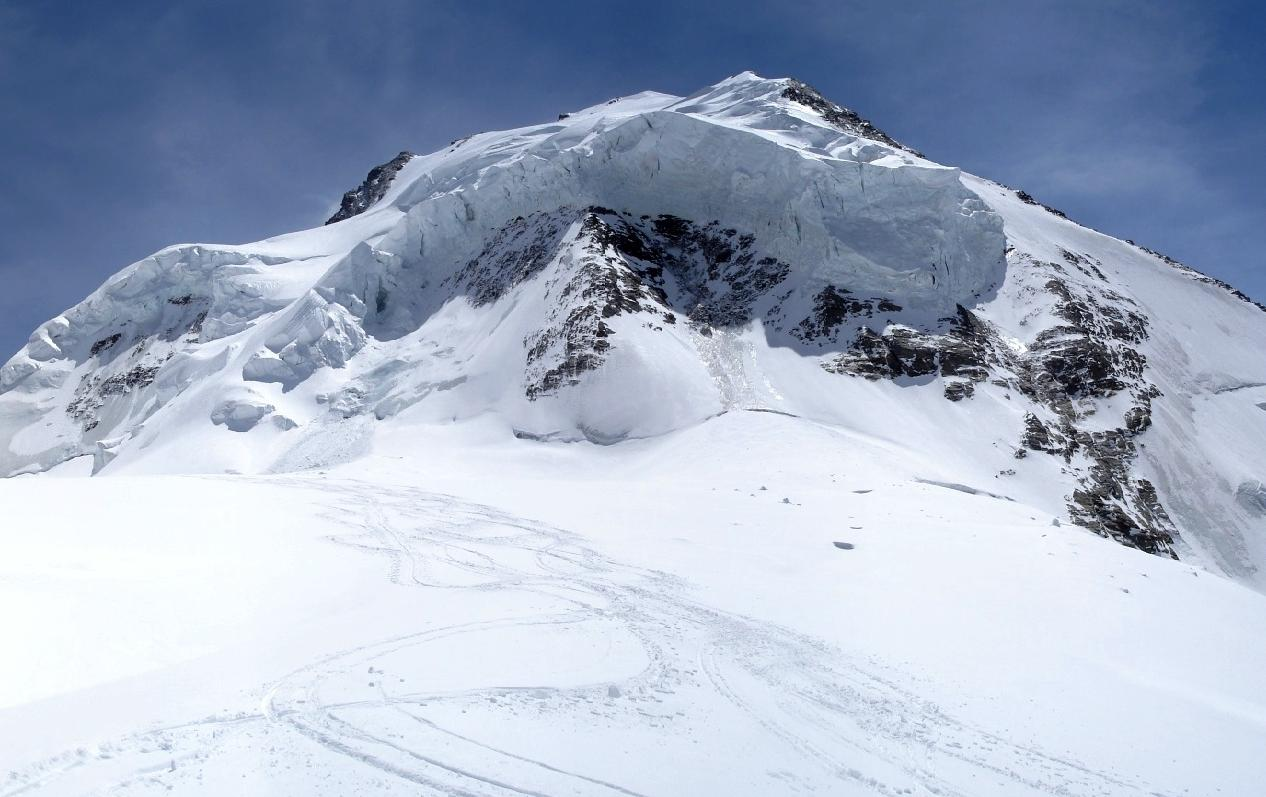
On the Hohberggletscher glacier below the north face

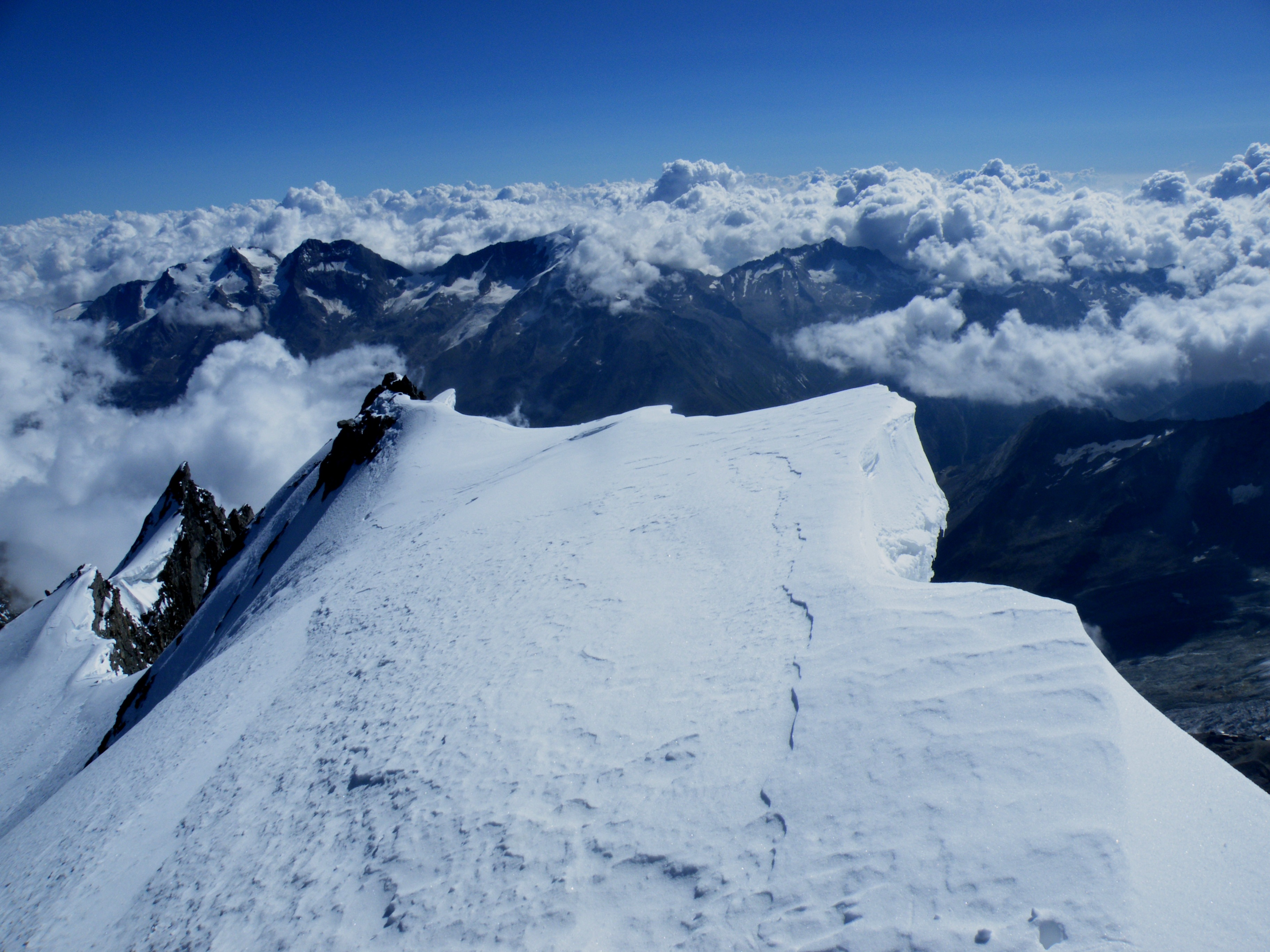
View towards east on the top

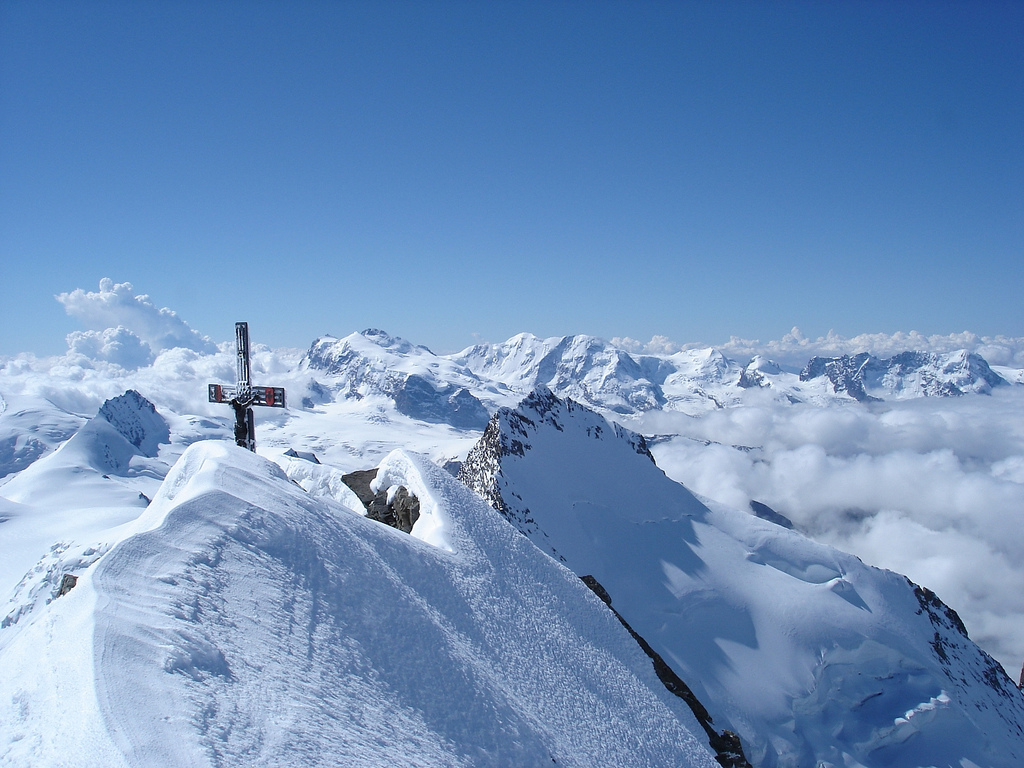
The summit
