= Nadelhorn =

Mountain in Switzerland

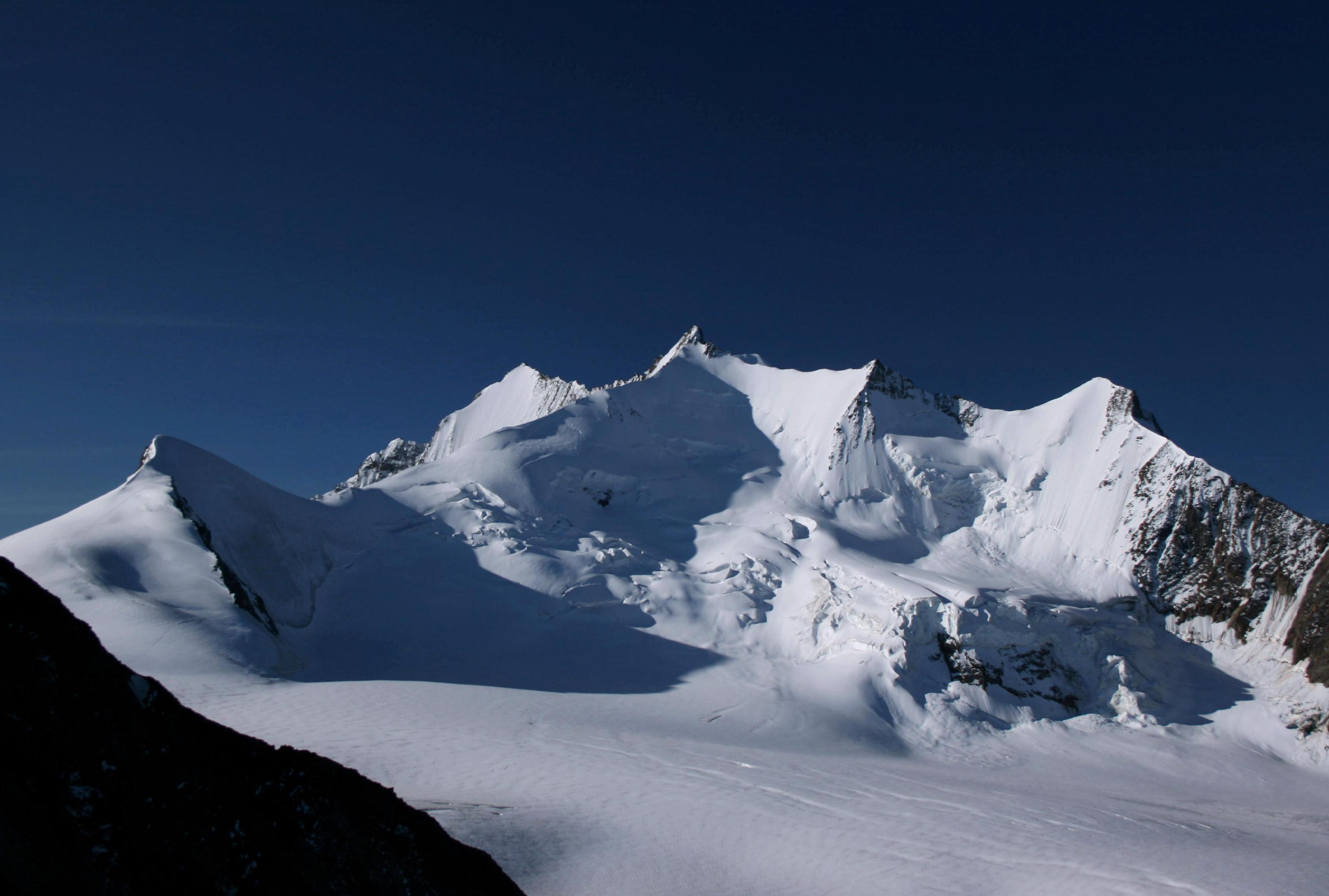
- Nadelhorn (center) and Nadelgrat

Highest point
- Elevation: 4,327 m (14,196 ft)
- Prominence: 207 m ↓ Lenzjoch
- Parent peak: Dom
- Isolation: 1.7 km → Dom
- Coordinates: 46°06′31.5″N 7°51′51″E

Geography
- Location within Switzerland
- Location: Switzerland
- Parent range: Pennine Alps

Climbing
- First ascent: 16 September 1858 by Franz Andenmatten, Baptiste Epiney, Aloys Supersaxo and J. Zimmermann
- Easiest route: Basic snow climb

The Nadelhorn (4,327 m, 14,196 ft) is a mountain in the Pennine Alps in Switzerland. It is the highest point on the Nadelgrat, a high-level ridge running roughly north–south above the resort of Saas-Fee to the east, and the Mattertal to the west. Its three ridges join to form a sharp-pointed summit, which looks like a needle (German: Nadel) when seen from the north. The other summits on the Nadelgrat are the Stecknadelhorn, the Hohberghorn, the Dürrenhorn and the Lenzspitze.

It was first climbed by Franz Andenmatten, Baptiste Epiney, Aloys Supersaxo and J. Zimmermann on 16 September 1858.

== See also ==
- List of 4000 metre peaks of the Alps
