= Saas-Fee =

- Municipality
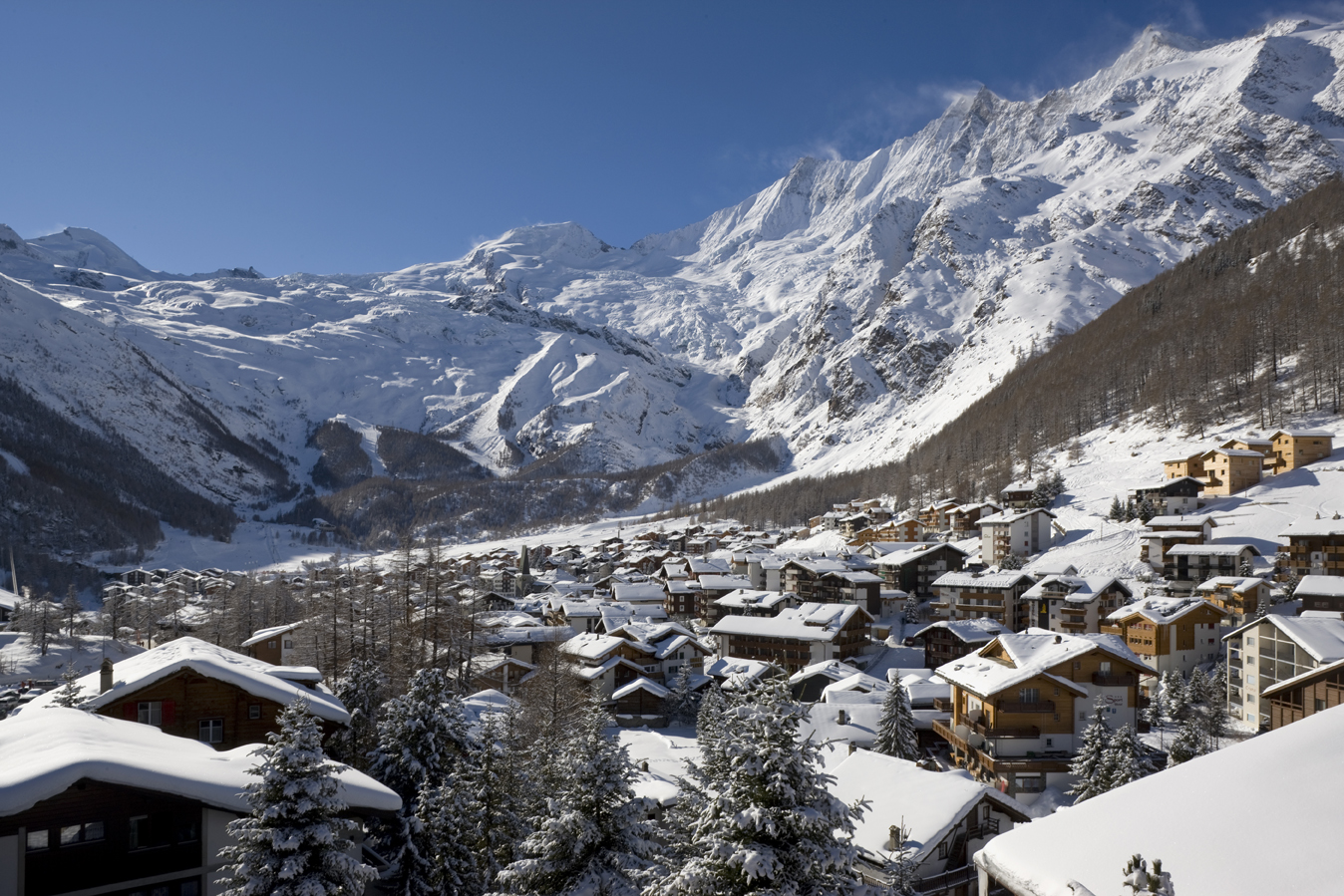

- Flag Coat of arms
- Location of Saas-Fee
- Location within Switzerland Location within Canton of Valais
- Coordinates: 46°6.58′N 7°55.75′E
- Country: Switzerland
- Canton: Valais
- District: Visp

Government
  - Mayor: Roger Kalbermatten

Area
  - Total: 40.57 km^{2} (15.66 sq mi)
- Elevation: 1,800 m (5,900 ft)

Population (2002)
  - Total: 1,607
  - Density: 39.61/km^{2} (102.6/sq mi)
- Time zone: UTC+01:00 (CET)
  - Summer (DST): UTC+02:00 (CEST)
- Postal code: 3906
- SFOS number: 6290
- ISO 3166 code: CH-VS
- Surrounded by: Randa, Saas-Almagell, Saas-Balen, Saas-Grund, Sankt Niklaus, Täsch
- Twin towns: Almora (India), Rocca di Cambio (Italy), Steamboat Springs (United States)
- Website: saas-fee.ch

Saas-Fee (German: [zaːsˈfeː]) is the main village in the Saastal, or the Saas Valley, and is a municipality in the district of Visp in the canton of Valais in Switzerland. The village is situated on a high mountain plateau at 1,800 meters (5,900 feet), surrounded by a total of 13 peaks above 4,000 meters (13,123 feet) which is the highest concentration in the Alps, giving the village the nickname the Pearl of the Alps. It is a classic ski resort characterised by well-preserved Swiss wood architecture and a car-free city centre. The villages in its neighbourhood are Saas-Almagell, Saas-Grund and Saas-Balen.

== Overview ==
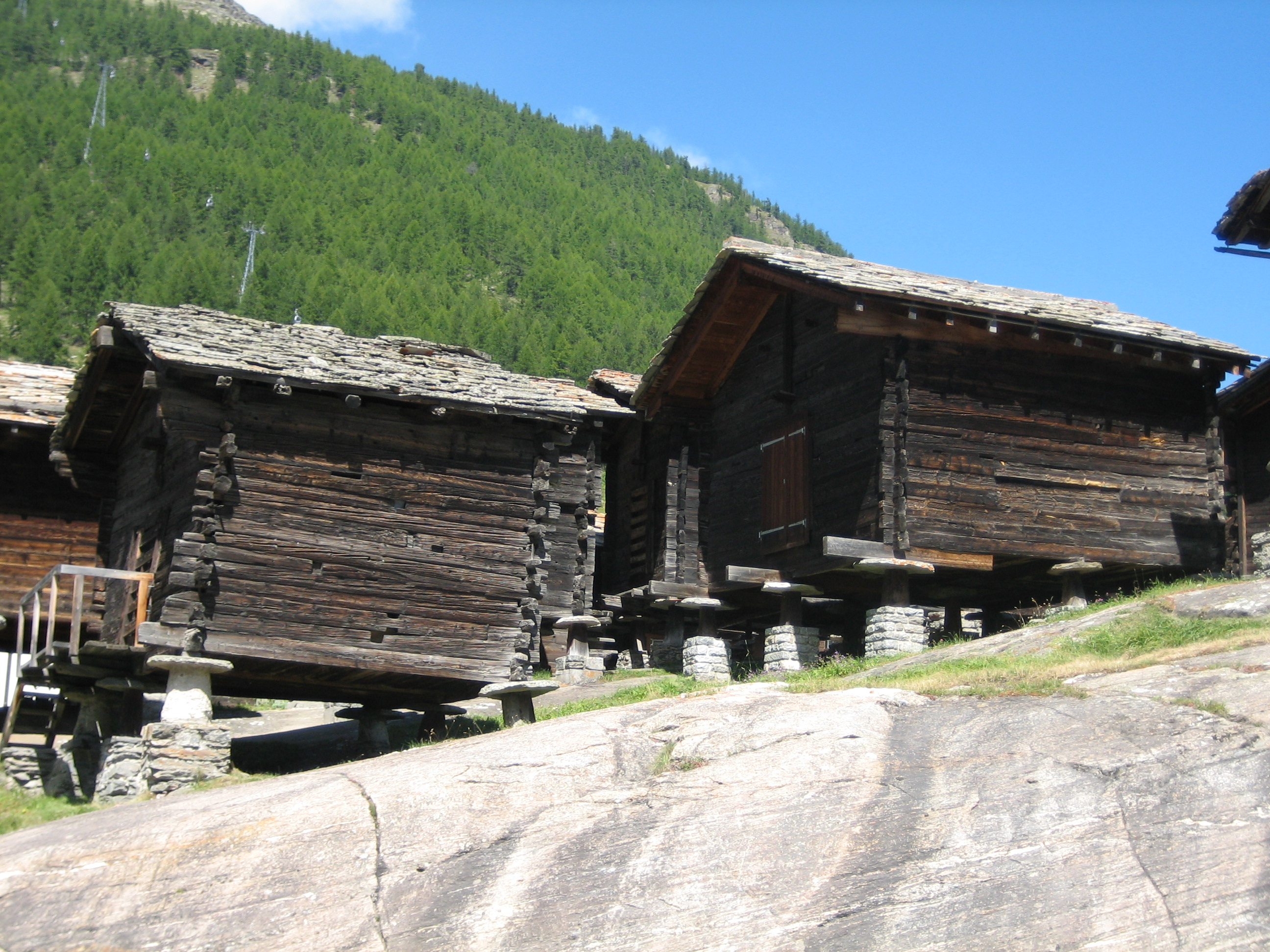
Traditional raccard granaries in Saas-Fee

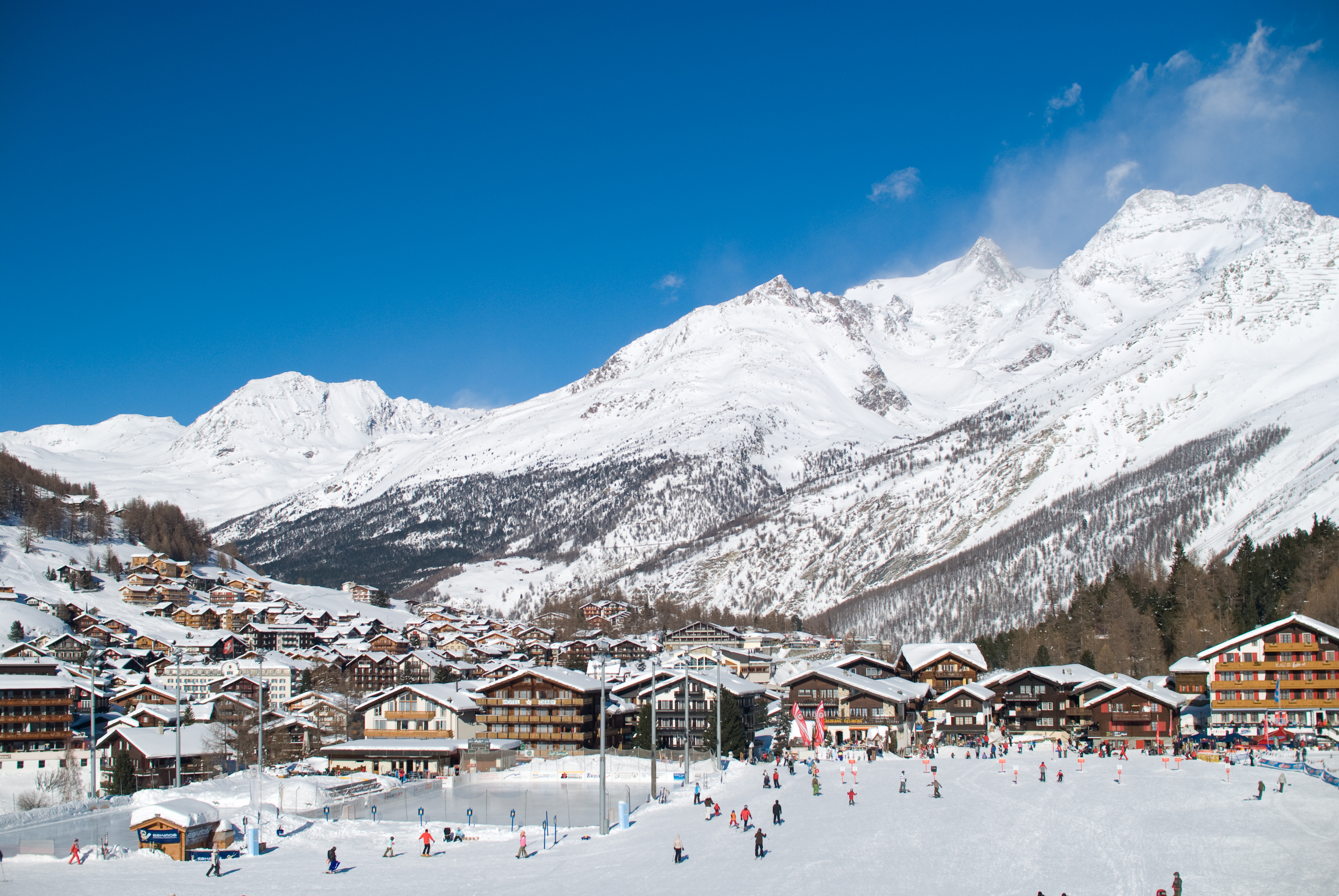
Saas-Fee as seen from the bottom of the slopes

Its location close to the glaciers of the Dom and the Allalinhorn provides winter sport opportunities throughout the year, and neighbouring peaks such as the Weissmies, the Nadelhorn and the Lenzspitze are popular climbs in the summer season. The community is considered to be a very attractive winter sport destination in the Swiss Alps. Typical activities include skiing, snowboarding, snowshoe trekking, canyon climbing and ice climbing.

Saas-Fee offers 22 lifts, including 3 cable cars, 1 funicular railway (Metro Alpin), 5 gondolas (1 dedicated to walkers), 2 chairlifts, the remainder being surface lifts (draglifts). The ski run has a vertical drop of 1,800 m (5,906 ft), a top elevation of 3,600 m (11,811 ft) and covers 150 km (93 mi) (80 km (50 mi) beginner, 45 km (28 mi) intermediate, 25 km (16 mi) advanced). Other activities include paragliding, hang gliding, and tobogganing.

Saas-Fee can be reached by car or bus – postal buses run during much of the day half-hourly from Brig and Visp, though none provides a service beyond the bus terminal through the length of the town during the winter. No cars are allowed to enter the city (they have to be parked in special car parks outside); only small electric vehicles operate on the streets between the hotels and ski area. The decision to exclude most motor vehicles was made by the village at the time of the construction of the road from Saas Grund in 1951 in order to eliminate air pollution.

The resort offers many culture, sports, and off-slope activities, including classical music, a sports and leisure complex, restaurants, and nightclubs. The resort features the highest underground funicular railway in the world up to the skiing area and the highest revolving restaurant in the world at 3,500 m (11,500 ft). The touristic slogan of Saas-Fee is "Die Perle der Alpen" (The Pearl of the Alps) as it is surrounded by a total of 13 peaks above 4,000 metres (13,123 feet), the most in the Alps. A campus of the European Graduate School is located in Saas-Fee.

== History ==
Aerial view (1964)

Saas-Fee is first mentioned in 1304 as vee. The municipality was formerly known by its French name Fée ([fe]); however, that name is no longer used.

== Geography ==
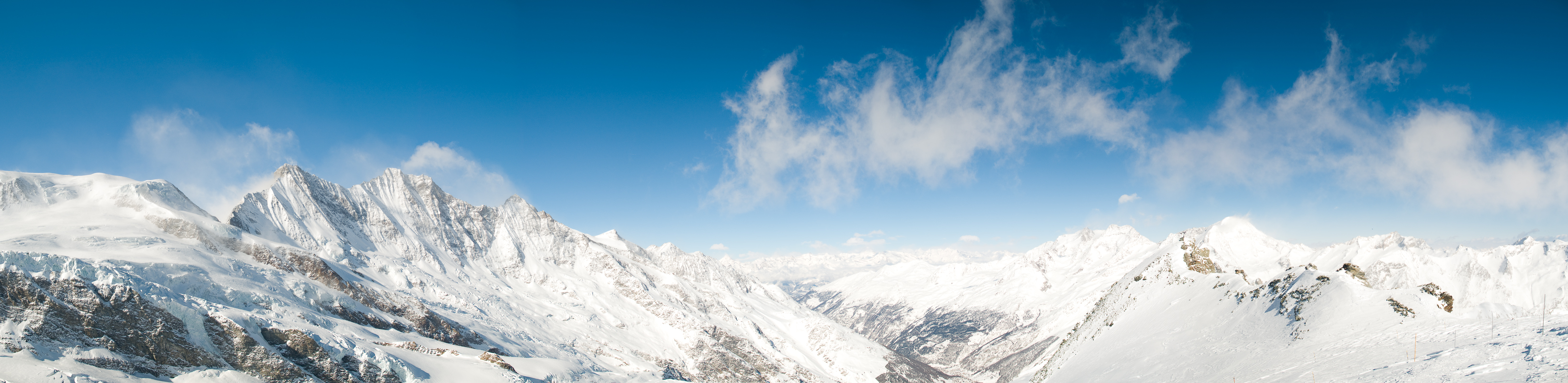
Panorama showing parts of the Feeglacier, the Alphubel, Täschhorn, Dom and Lenzspitze on the left, and Saas-Fee and Saas-Grund at the bottom middle

Saas-Fee has an area, as of 2011, of 40.6 square kilometers (15.7 mi^{2}). Of this area, 5.7% is used for agricultural purposes, while 9.5% is forested. Of the rest of the land, 1.3% is settled (buildings or roads) and 83.6% is unproductive land.

The municipality is located in the Visp district, at the foot of Dom Mountain. The village is surrounded by thirteen Four-thousander mountains (mountains that are at least 4,000 meters (13,000 ft) above sea level).

== Coat of arms ==
The blazon of the municipal coat of arms is Azure, the initials SSF Or between two Mullets [of Six] Argent in base Coupeaux Vert.

== Demographics ==
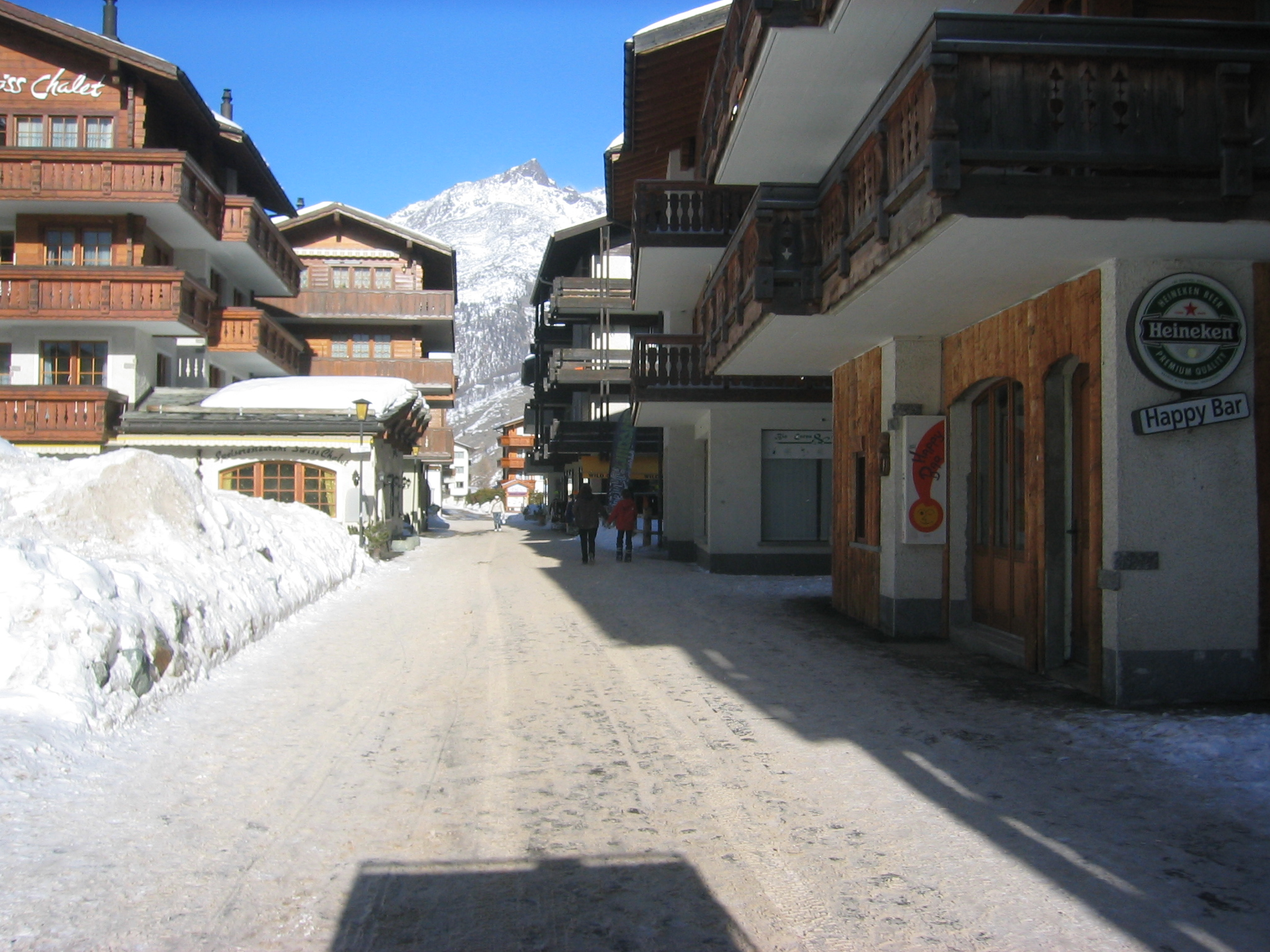
Saas-Fee

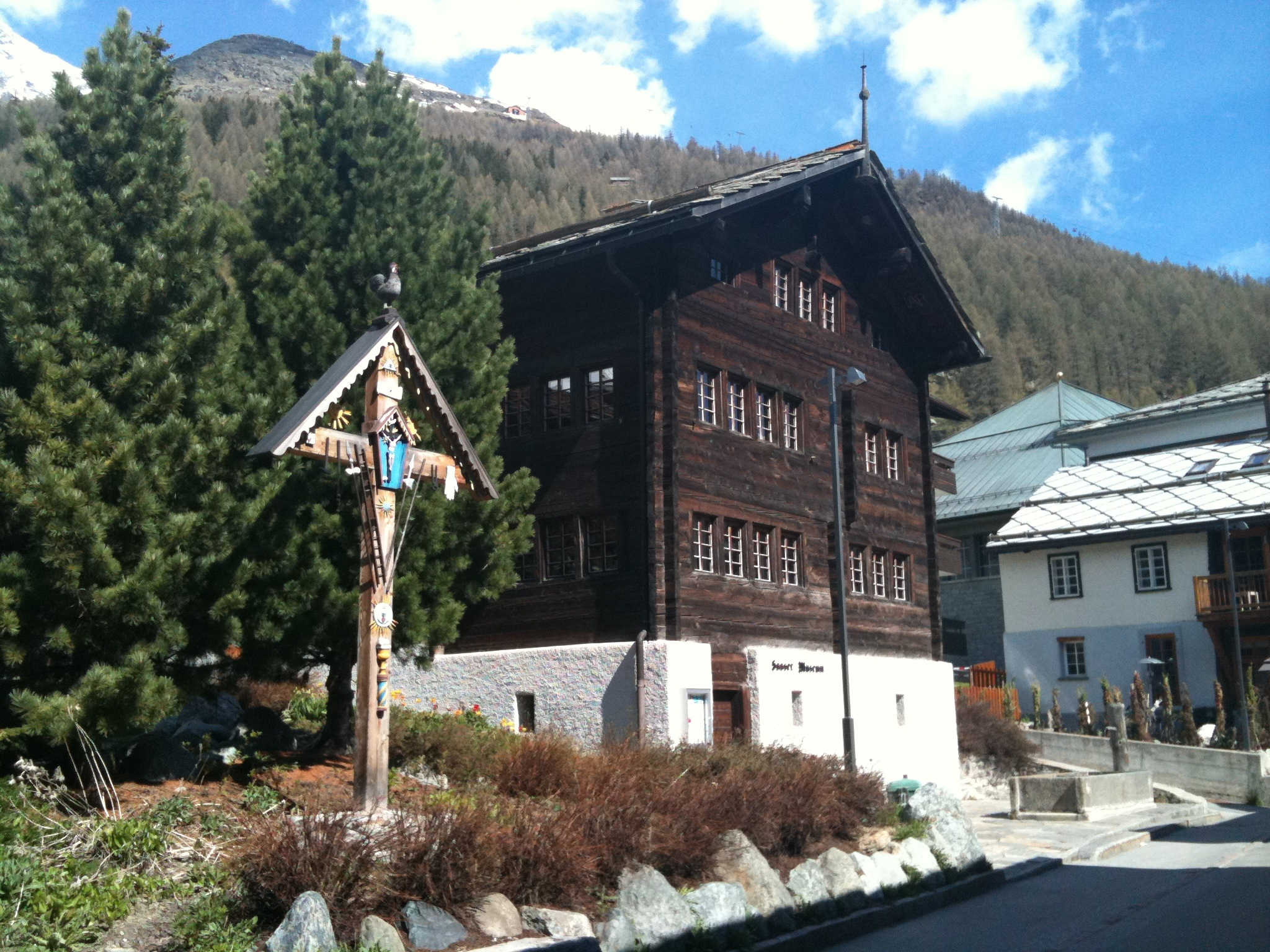
City museum of Saas-Fee

Saas-Fee has a population (as of December 2020) of 1,559. As of 2008, 28.5% of the population are resident foreign nationals. Over the last 10 years (2000–2010) the population has changed at a rate of 3.4%. It has changed at a rate of 0.5% due to migration and at a rate of 6.3% due to births and deaths.

Most of the population (as of 2000) speaks German (1,243 or 85.5%) as their first language. The German dialect spoken is called Walser German and is partly unintelligible to speakers of Standard German. Serbo-Croatian is the second most common (98 or 6.7%) and Portuguese is the third (47 or 3.2%). There are 16 people who speak French, 12 people who speak Italian and 2 people who speak Romansh.

Of the population in the municipality, 745 or about 51.2% were born in Saas-Fee and lived there in 2000. There were 200 or 13.8% who were born in the same canton, while 207 or 14.2% were born somewhere else in Switzerland, and 265 or 18.2% were born outside of Switzerland.

As of 2000, children and teenagers (0–19 years old) make up 23.6% of the population, while adults (20–64 years old) make up 64.6% and seniors (over 64 years old) make up 11.8%.

As of 2000, there were 648 people who were single and never married in the municipality. There were 717 married individuals, 69 widows or widowers and 20 individuals who are divorced.

As of 2000, there were 625 private households in the municipality, and an average of 2.2 persons per household. There were 243 households that consist of only one person and 34 households with five or more people. In 2000, a total of 604 apartments (39.4% of the total) were permanently occupied, while 864 apartments (56.4%) were seasonally occupied and 64 apartments (4.2%) were empty. As of 2009, the construction rate of new housing units was 12.2 new units per 1000 residents. The vacancy rate for the municipality, in 2010, was 3.83%.

The historical population is given in the following chart:

== Politics ==
In the 2007 federal election the most popular party was the CVP which received 64.08% of the vote. The next three most popular parties were the FDP (23.78%), the SVP (7.06%) and the SP (3.2%). In the federal election, a total of 678 votes were cast, and the voter turnout was 67.1%.

In the 2009 Conseil d'État/Staatsrat election a total of 703 votes were cast, of which 26 or about 3.7% were invalid. The voter participation was 69.5%, which is much more than the cantonal average of 54.67%. In the 2007 Swiss Council of States election a total of 666 votes were cast, of which 30 or about 4.5% were invalid. The voter participation was 66.3%, which is much more than the cantonal average of 59.88%.

== Economy ==
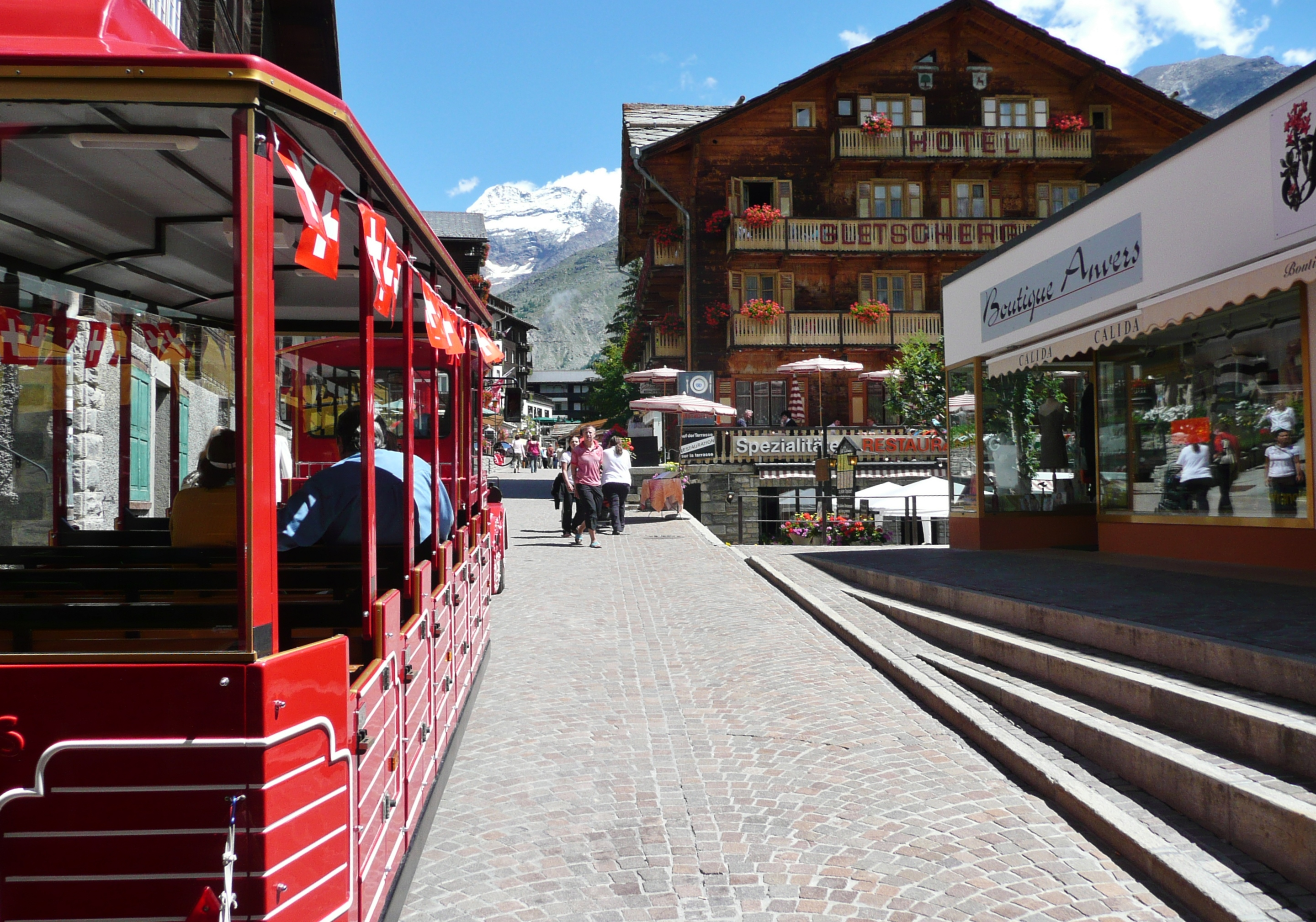
Electric vehicle on Obere Dorfstraße, the main street in Saas-Fee

As of 2010, Saas-Fee had an unemployment rate of 3.3%. As of 2008, there were 5 people employed in the primary economic sector and about 2 businesses involved in this sector. 131 people were employed in the secondary sector and there were 19 businesses in this sector. 1,169 people were employed in the tertiary sector, with 182 businesses in this sector. There were 883 residents of the municipality who were employed in some capacity, of which females made up 43.8% of the workforce.

In 2008 the total number of full-time equivalent jobs was 1,197. The number of jobs in the primary sector was 2, all of which were in agriculture. The number of jobs in the secondary sector was 124 of which 34 or (27.4%) were in manufacturing and 87 (70.2%) were in construction. The number of jobs in the tertiary sector was 1,071. In the tertiary sector; 181 or 16.9% were in wholesale or retail sales or the repair of motor vehicles, 125 or 11.7% were in the movement and storage of goods, 615 or 57.4% were in a hotel or restaurant, 17 or 1.6% were the insurance or financial industry, 32 or 3.0% were technical professionals or scientists, 17 or 1.6% were in education and 12 or 1.1% were in health care.

In 2000, there were 227 workers who commuted into the municipality and 65 workers who commuted away. The municipality is a net importer of workers, with about 3.5 workers entering the municipality for every one leaving. Of the working population, 6.8% used public transportation to get to work, and 4.3% used a private car.

== Religion ==
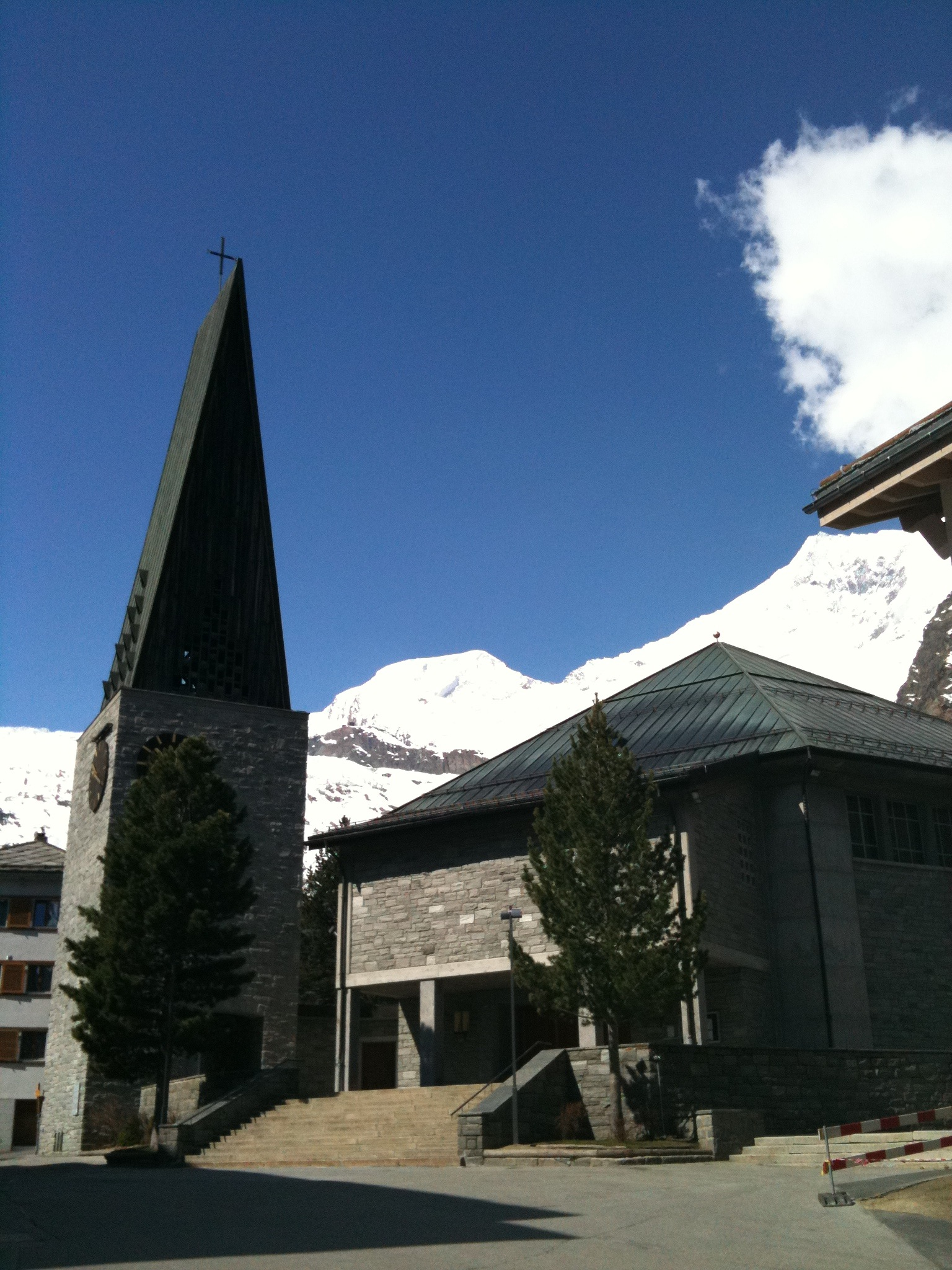
Herz-Jesu Church in Saas-Fee

From the 2000 census, 1,177 or 80.9% were Roman Catholic, while 101 or 6.9% belonged to the Swiss Reformed Church. Of the rest of the population, there were 81 members of an Orthodox church (or about 5.57% of the population), and there was one individual who belongs to another Christian church. There was one individual who was Jewish, and 12 (or about 0.83% of the population) who were Islamic. There were 2 individuals who were Buddhist and 2 individuals who belonged to another church. 22 (or about 1.51% of the population) belonged to no church, are agnostic or atheist, and 55 individuals (or about 3.78% of the population) did not answer the question.

== Education ==
In Saas-Fee about 613 or (42.2%) of the population have completed non-mandatory upper secondary education, and 113 or (7.8%) have completed additional higher education (either university or a Fachhochschule). Of the 113 who completed tertiary schooling, 65.5% were Swiss men, 19.5% were Swiss women, 9.7% were non-Swiss men and 5.3% were non-Swiss women.

During the 2010–2011 school year, there were a total of 137 students in the Saas-Fee school system. The education system in the Canton of Valais allows young children to attend one year of non-obligatory Kindergarten. During that school year, there 2 kindergarten classes (KG1 or KG2) and 32 kindergarten students. The canton's school system requires students to attend six years of primary school. In Saas-Fee, there were a total of 8 classes and 137 students in the primary school. The secondary school program consists of three lower, obligatory years of schooling (orientation classes), followed by three to five years of optional, advanced schools. All the lower and upper secondary students from Saas-Fee attend their school in a neighboring municipality.

As of 2000, there were 73 students from Saas-Fee who attended schools outside the municipality.

Saas Fee is also the location of the European Graduate School. EGS was established in 1994 as a postgraduate degree-granting school. Founding contributors included eminent philosophers such as Jacques Derrida and Jean-François Lyotard, and many leading thinkers teach there to this day, including Slavoj Žižek, Judith Butler, Alain Badiou, Peter Greenaway, and Geert Lovink.

== Mountains ==
Peak	Elevation	First climbed
Ulrichshorn	3,925 m (12,877 ft)	1848-08-10
Strahlhorn	4,190 m (13,750 ft)	1854-08-15
Fletschhorn	3,996 m (13,110 ft)	1854-08-28
Weissmies	4,023 m (13,199 ft)	1855 – August
Lagginhorn	4,010 m (13,160 ft)	1856-08-26
Allalinhorn	4,027 m (13,212 ft)	1856-08-28
Latelhorn	3,198 m (10,492 ft)	1856-08-28
Dom	4,545 m (14,911 ft)	1858-09-11
Nadelhorn	4,327 m (14,196 ft)	1858-09-16
Rimpfischhorn	4,198 m (13,773 ft)	1859-09-09
Alphubel	4,206 m (13,799 ft)	1860-08-09
Täschhorn	4,490 m (14,730 ft)	1862-07-30
Balfrin	3,795 m (12,451 ft)	1863-07-06
Hohberghorn	4,219 m (13,842 ft)	1869
Südlenz	4,294 m (14,088 ft)	1870
Portjengrat	3,653 m (11,985 ft)	1871-09-07
Sonnighorn	3,487 m (11,440 ft)	1879 – August
Dürrenhorn	4,034 m (13,235 ft)	1879-09-07
Feechopf	3,888 m (12,756 ft)	1883-07-28
Stecknadelhorn	4,242 m (13,917 ft)	1887-08-08

== In popular culture ==
Saas-Fée is the setting of the second part of André Gide's 1925 novel Les faux-monnayeurs where the village is described as a retreat far away from the societal pressures at the time.

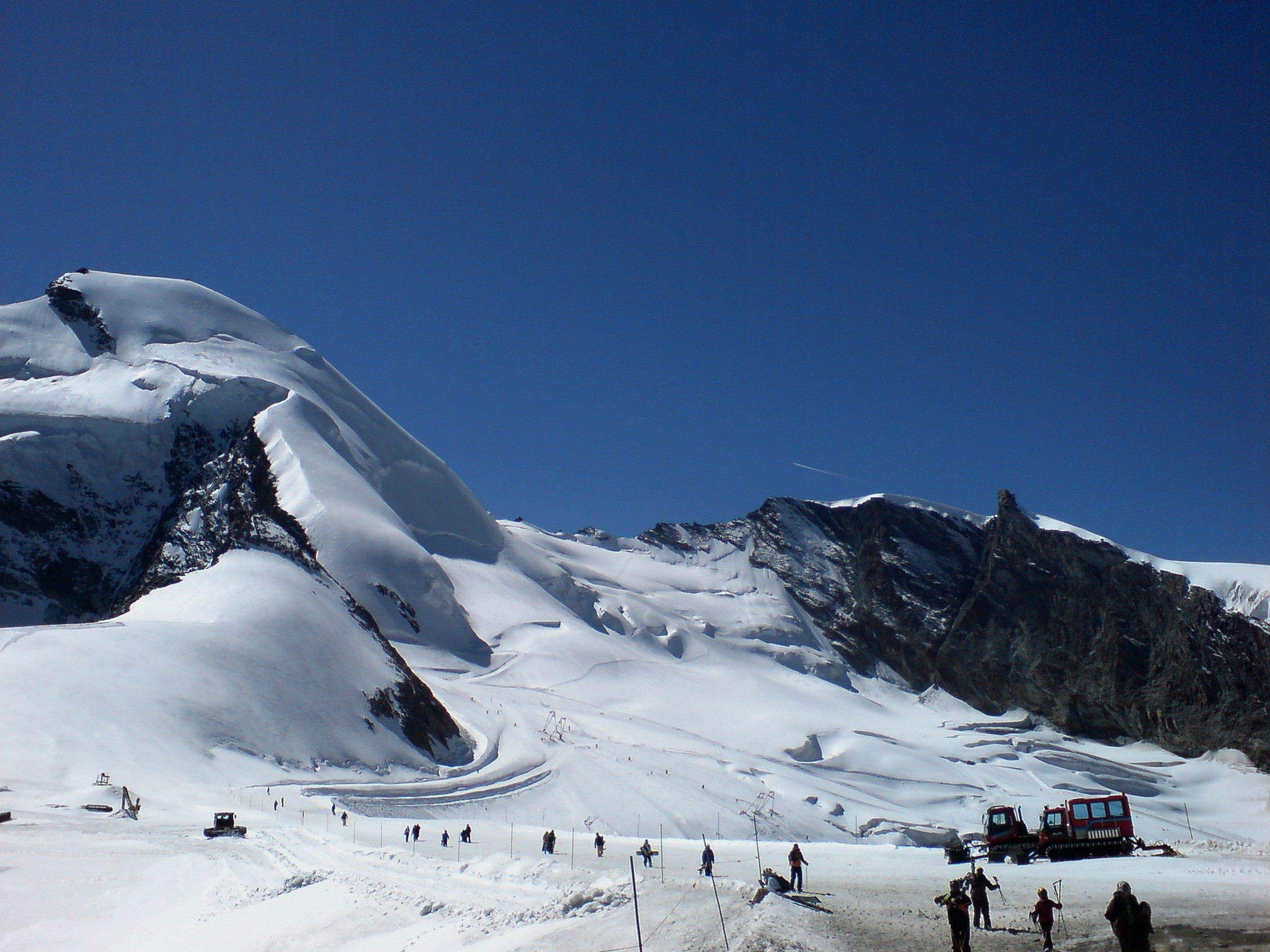
Summer ski area in Mittelallalin.

The famous ski chase scene in the 1969 James Bond movie On Her Majesty’s Secret Service was filmed in the Mittelallalin ski area above Saas-Fee.

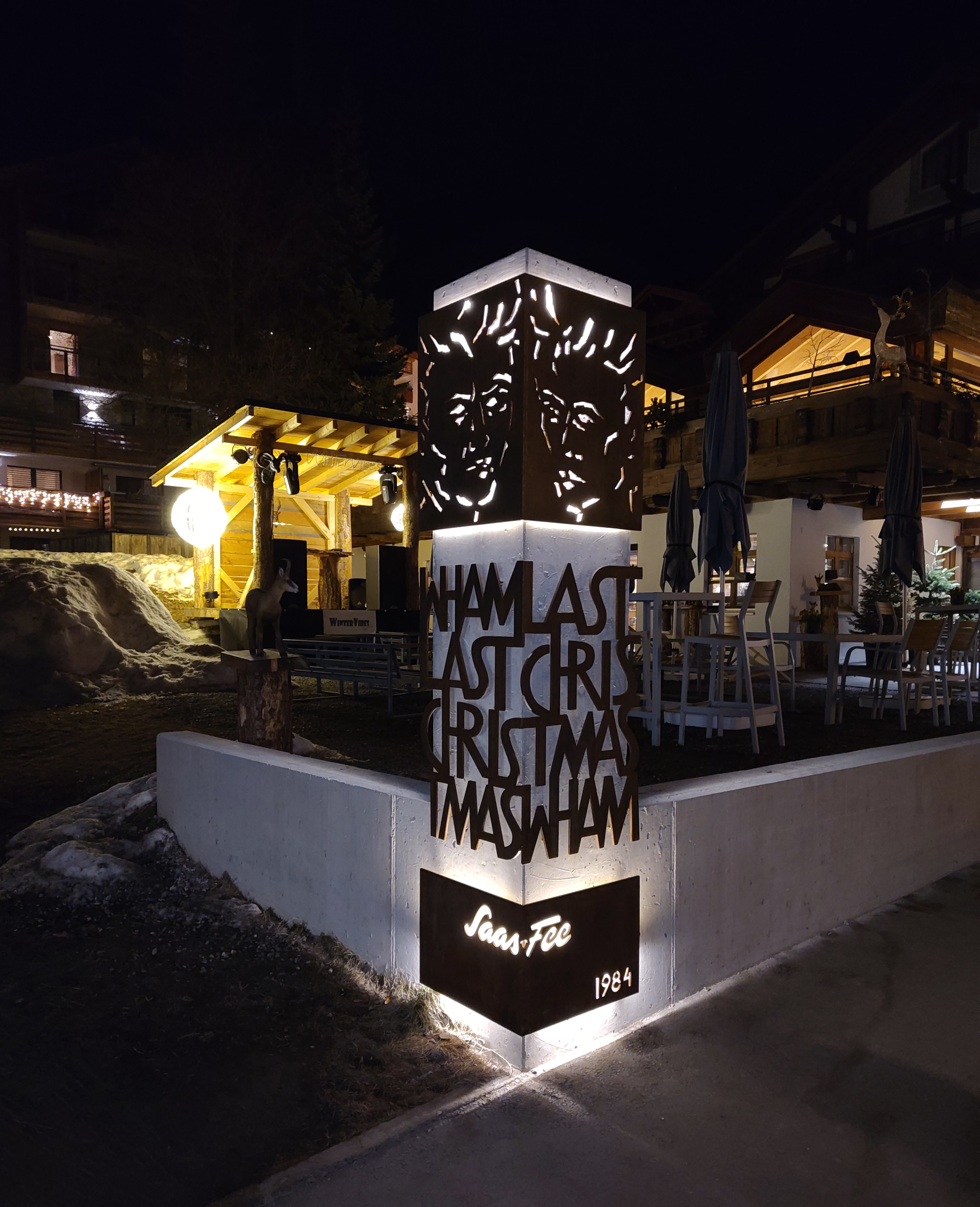
Wham! Last Christmas monument in Saas-Fée, Switzerland

Saas-Fee was the location for the filming of the video of Wham!'s hit single Last Christmas in 1984. The cable car that they get into to go up the mountain is labelled with the name "Saas-Fee" in the typical Saas-Fee font. This appears to be an artistic device as the cable car, now replaced by a more modern version, runs between the edge of Saas-Fee and Felskinn which is considerably above the normal height for residential buildings. In 2024, the surviving cast and crew from the recording of the Last Christmas music video returned to the village for the unveiling of a pillar commemorating the song's 40th anniversary.

== Notable people ==
- Arnold Andenmatten (1922–2018, skier)
- Alexander Burgener (1845–1910, mountain guide)
- Carl Zuckmayer (1896–1977, German writer, interred in Saas Fee)
- Matthias Zurbriggen (1856–1917, alpinist)
- Frederik Kalbermatten (b. 1981, snowboarder)

== See also ==
- Brig-Visp-Zermatt railway
- List of ski areas and resorts in Switzerland
