= Valle Antrona =

Valley in Piedmont, Italy

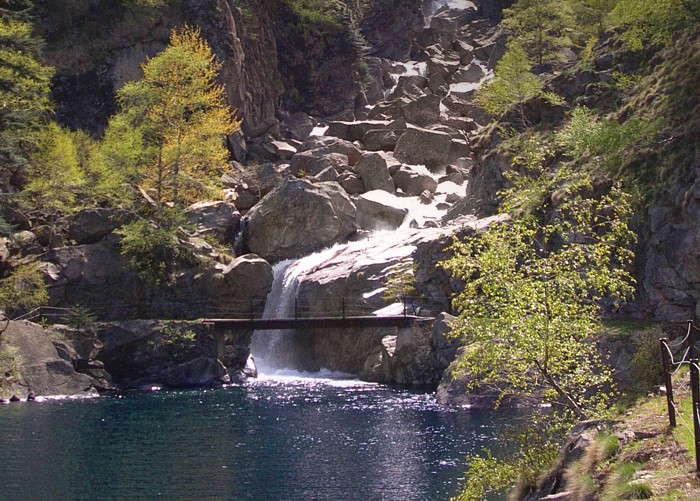
- The Troncone River flowing into Lake Antrona
- Area: 141.43 km^{2} (54.61 mi^{2})

Geography
- Country: Italy
- State: Piemonte
- comune: Verbano-Cusio-Ossola
- Population centers: Montescheno, Borgomezzavalle, Antrona Schieranco
- River: Ovesca
- Interactive map of Valle Antrona

Valle Antrona (Antrona Valley) is a valley of the Alps, situated in the Pennine range. The valley is drained by the Ovesca, a tributary meeting the Toce at Villadossola, one of the seven valleys of the Val d'Ossola. It has a total of 1,140 inhabitants, distributed over an area of 141.43 km². Sporting the Alta Valle Antrona Natural Park, it is situated to the north of the Valle Anzasca. Historically it was the site of gold and mica mining. Its demonym is "Antronesi".

== Etymology ==
The valley takes its name from the town of Antronapiana.

== History ==
The Antrona valley and all of the Piedmont region formed part of the Kingdom of Sardinia prior to the creation of the Kingdom of Italy in 1861.

According to local legend, the town of Antronapiana was the subject to a large landslide at the beginning of the 18th century, creating a barrier dam and flooding the town.

In the early 19th century the only access to the valley was via a dangerous mountain road, described in 1819 as:

It crosses the side of a high mountain which has completely collapsed: above all one can see nothing but loose earth and large stones with fragments and debris in bulk, where the landslide, although not continuous, has already caused the death of several passengers. Below then there is a deep abyss where the stranger, unaccustomed to such dangers, trembles and trembles at every step; considering which cannot place its foot except on a very narrow false bottom, mobile and slippery at the slightest impact.

Valley life in the 19th century was difficult with much of the population engaged in transhumance. The economy of the valley centred around cattle, charcoal, and mining. The latter developed rapidly in response to a 1786 essay on mining by Spirito Nicolis di Robilant. Iron mining also occurred at Montescheno and a trip hammer appears on the coat of arms of Borgomezzavalle. Ironworks were located at Viganella and Villadossola in 1819.

=== Mining History ===
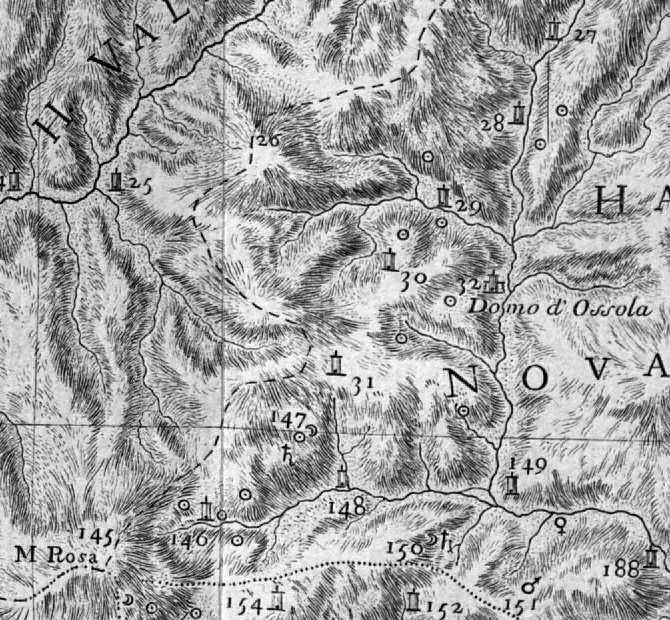
1786 map by Robilant enumerating then known mineral occurrences in the Duchy of Savoy. Number 31 is Antrona.

The Antrona Valley is situated at the northern end of the Monte Rosa Gold District and organised hardrock gold mining occurred over a period of some 200 years between the mid 18th and mid 20th centuries.

Gold mining in the valley is concentrated in the vicinity of frazioni of Locasca and Prabernado on the slopes of Punta di Tivera in the comune of Antrona Schieranco. In 1776 Victor Amadeus III granted Carlo Andrea Morandini prospecting rights at Trivera Alp; family was still working it in 1866. The Antrona gold mines are mentioned by in 1786 by Spirito Nicolis di Robilant, when he was General Inspector of the Piedmontese Mines and whilst Piedmont still formed part of the kingdom of Sardinia. The mines mentioned at this time were Porticciô de St. Pierre, Camasca, Antrona and Filon de Saut. The latter was the richest with ore grades of 6 dram, 6 grain to the hundredweight. In 1817 there were a total of 10 underground workings in 8 separate locations.

Of the gold cave cultivated in the Antrona valley in the year 1817
Owner (surname)	Location	Number of Workings
Morandini Mr Antonio Maria	In Trivera at Mottone.	2
Pozzoli Mr. Gio. Angiolo, parish priest, Moggia brothers Giuseppe and Ambrogio Luigi, Plosa Gio, Jacaccio Pietro, Rossi Francesco, et al.	Idem.	1
Mr. Carl'Antonio Laurini, Antonio Maria Morandini, and other members of the Chiolino Alberto family.	In the Mee Fountains	2
Guaglio Francesco, purchaser of Frisa Gio.	At Bricco delle Mee or in the Fountains	1
Mutti Alberto and Plosa Giovanni and other members.	At Croppi or at Cantonaccio	1
Bellardo Antonio	At Balmaccio above Locasca	1
Guggia Pietro and Moggia Francesco	In Camma	1
Mutti Alberti and Companions	In Trivera at Mottone on the Piano Scaglie	1
	Total	10

Mining continued at principally in two separate mines that were often worked together, known as Mottone-Mee and Prabernardo-Locasca. The Vallone Trivera where they are situated is known locally as the "Valley of the Gold Mines". The Mottone-Mee mine was still being worked by the Morandini family in 1866 when royal licence was again granted by letters patent. The Prabernardo-Locasca mine was worked from 1870-79 by the Anglo Italian Mining Company Limited, and then until 1899 by a private company. Mottone-Mee and Prabernardo-Locasca mines were amalgamated by the Swiss Sociètè des Mines d'or d'Antrona in 1898 and worked together until 1902. The company built a large workshop in Locasca, consisting of a crusher, a battery of 10 Kupp pylons, and a cyanidation plant, which precipitated the gold on lead plates using electricity. This plant was later replaced by a precipitation plant using zinc shavings. The concession was afterwards transferred to the Antrona Gold Mining Co. Ltd in 1902 and was still operating in 1936 after having been transferred through a series of joint stock companines.

The Prabernardo-Locasca mine (46.045435°N 8.135430°E) worked two lodes known as the Cava del Bosco and Toni. These were accessed by two crosscut tunnels: the Taglione (880m a.s.l.) and Toni (950m a.s.l.), both are about 350m in length. The development of the mine on the ore bodies continues for about 100m northwest-southeast. Other prospecting drives were opened at La Chietta (960m), Prete (905m), and Frisa (1018m and 1060m).

The Mottone-Mee mine (46.038800°N 8.127480°E) was described as "undoubtably the most important" in the Valley. Alpe Mulini (Mills Alp) acquired its name from the modified Alpine grain mills used to process the gold ore by the Morandini family of Alpe Trivera. The ore contained finely disseminated gold particles in a quartz-sulphide matrix.

From the village of Locasca, a mule track with 52 hairpin bends leads to the Mulini, the Mottone-Mee mine was then developed principally from the Fajot tunnel (1460m a.s.l.) and an aerial ropeway took ore back to the processing plant at Locasca. The lodes outcrop at Alpe Mee (1850m) and Alpe Mottone (1900m). A second aerial ropeway connected the Mottone-Mee workings with Mulini.

==== Geology ====
The ore bodies are hosted both in the mica schists, fine and Ghiandoni gneisses. The gneiss-related deposits generally appear as discordant veins in a lithoclase field approximately orthogonal to the schistosity while in the mica schists the most common bedding is concordant.

The lodes of the Mottone group are almost vertical and oriented generally NNW-SSE; their thickness varies from a couple of meters to 40-50 cm or less. The ore body is approximately 150 m in length with a depth of over 200 m. Mineralization is concentrated in preferential zones, forming richer "columns". Gold (in grades of around 5-10 gram/ton in the sorted bulk) is bound to sulphide and iron sulfoarsenide, occasionally accompanied by galena; the gangue is composed primarily of quartz, in which are found embedded fragments of the surrounding gneiss, silicified and sericitized.

== Geography ==
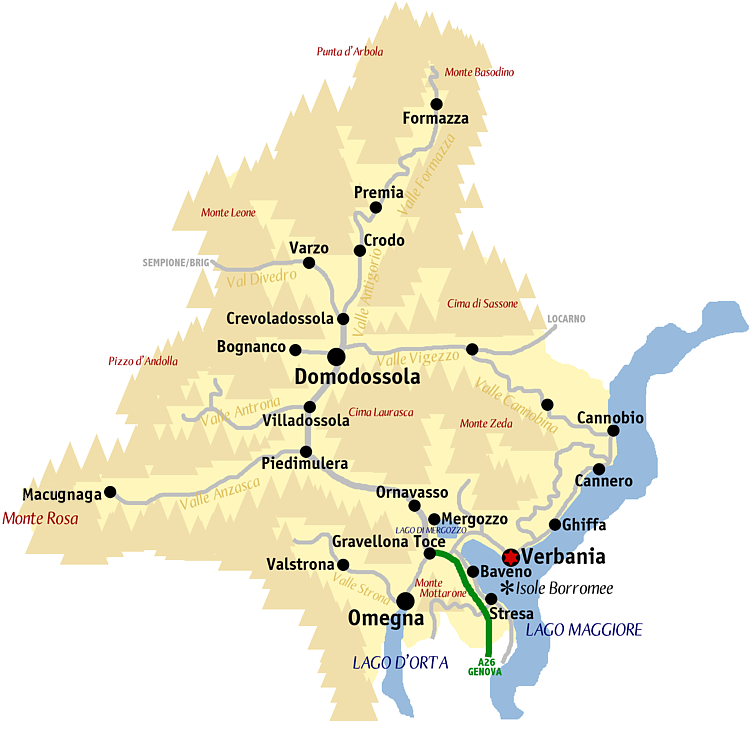
Map of the province of Verbano-Cusio-Ossola, showing the Valle Antrona.

The Antrona Valley is surrounded by mountains on its north, south and west sides. The minimum altitude of valley bottom is 450 m above sea level. Road access is via its opening in the east in Montescheno comune, following the route of the Ovesca River. The Pizzo d'Andolla at 3,656m is the highest mountain in the valley, forming part of the Swiss-Italian border. The valley encompasses the comunes of Antrona Schieranco and Saas-Almagell in the west and Borgomezzavalle and Villadossola in the east.

The Alta Valle Antrona Natural Park is located within the valley.

=== Mountains ===
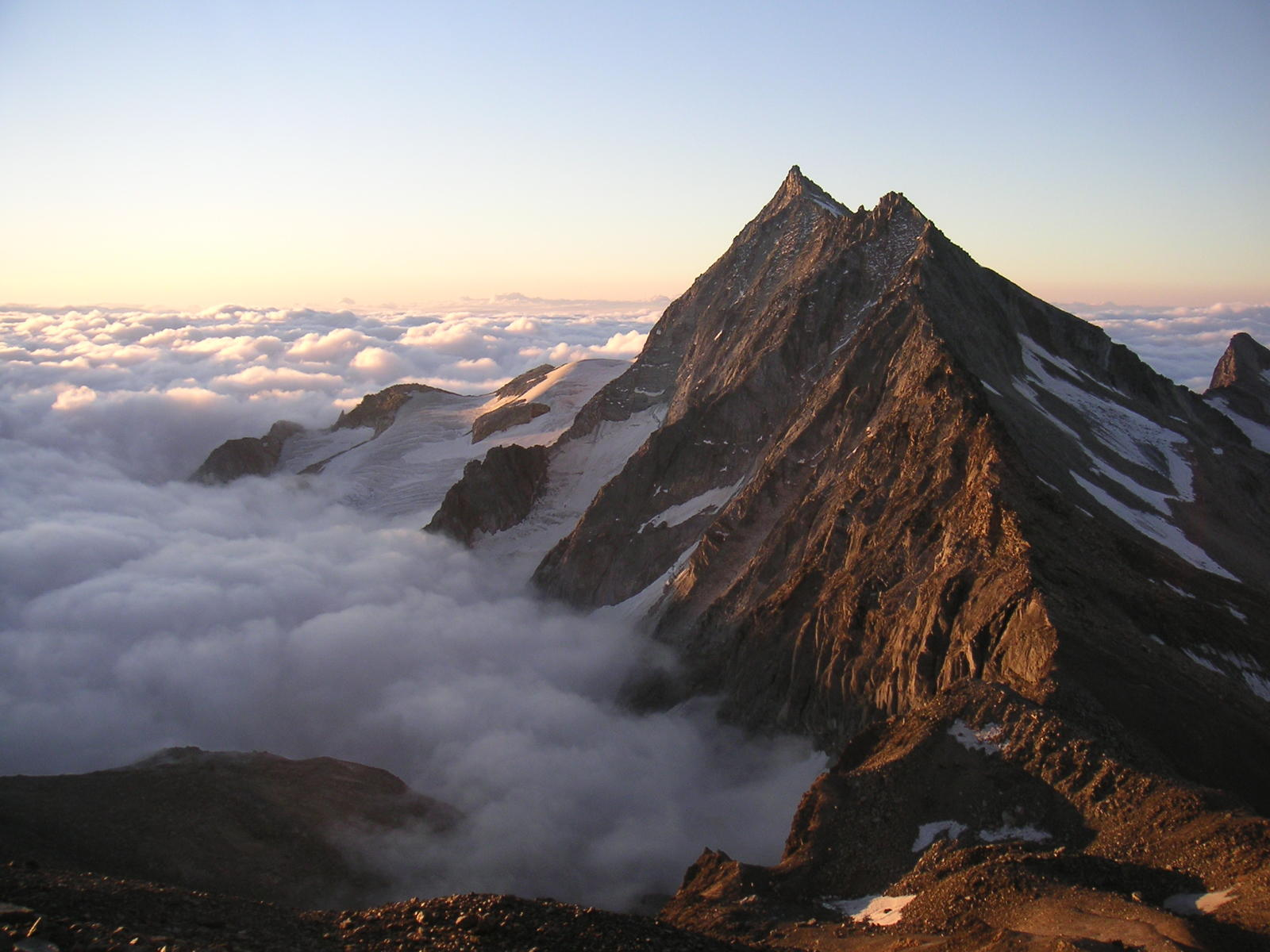
The Pizzo d'Andolla as seen from the Weissmies.

The valley is situated in the Pennine Alps, more specifically, in the Andolla range.

The main mountains surrounding the valley are:

- Pizzo d'Andolla - 3,656 m
- Pizzo Bottarello or Sonnighorn - 3,487 m
- Pizzo Loranco or Mittelruk - 3,362 m
- Pizzo Scarone - 3,341 m
- Jazzihorn or Pizzo Cingino Nord - 3,226 m
- Punta di Saas or Latelhorn - 3,200 m
- Punta Laugera - 2,995 m
- Punta della Rossa - 2,911 m
- Punta Turiggia - 2,811 m
- Pizzo San Martino - 2,733 m
- Pizzo Montalto - 2,705 m
- Pizzo del Ton - 2,675 m
- Pizzo Ciapè - 2,394 m

=== Passes ===
- Antrona Pass or Saas Pass (2,839 m) - towards the Swiss Saastal valley.
- Cingino Pass or Jazziluke (3,080 m) - towards the Swiss Ofental Valley.
- Antigine Pass or Ofental Pass (2,833 m) - towards the Swiss Ofental Valley.

=== Hydrography ===
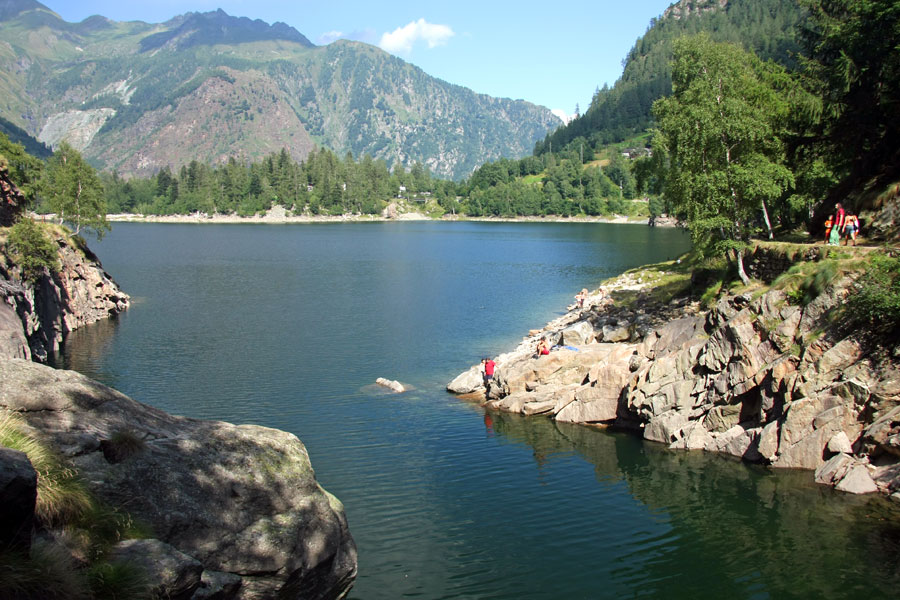
Lake Antrona.

Water in the Antrona Valley is a significant resource; streams and lakes abound. The Ovesca river, from its headwaters at Lake Antrona, runs the entire course of the valley. Lake Antrona was formed naturally following a landslide in 1642; its main tributary is the Troncone from the Pizzo d'Antigine. Shortly before flowing into Lake Antrona, the waters of the Troncone are dammed, creating the artificial Lake Campliccioli and used for hydroelectric power. Another artificial lake is Lake Cingino, located at 2,262 m above sea level. It is famous for its Alpine Ibex, who ascend the nearly vertical wall of the dam to lick salts (saltpeter).

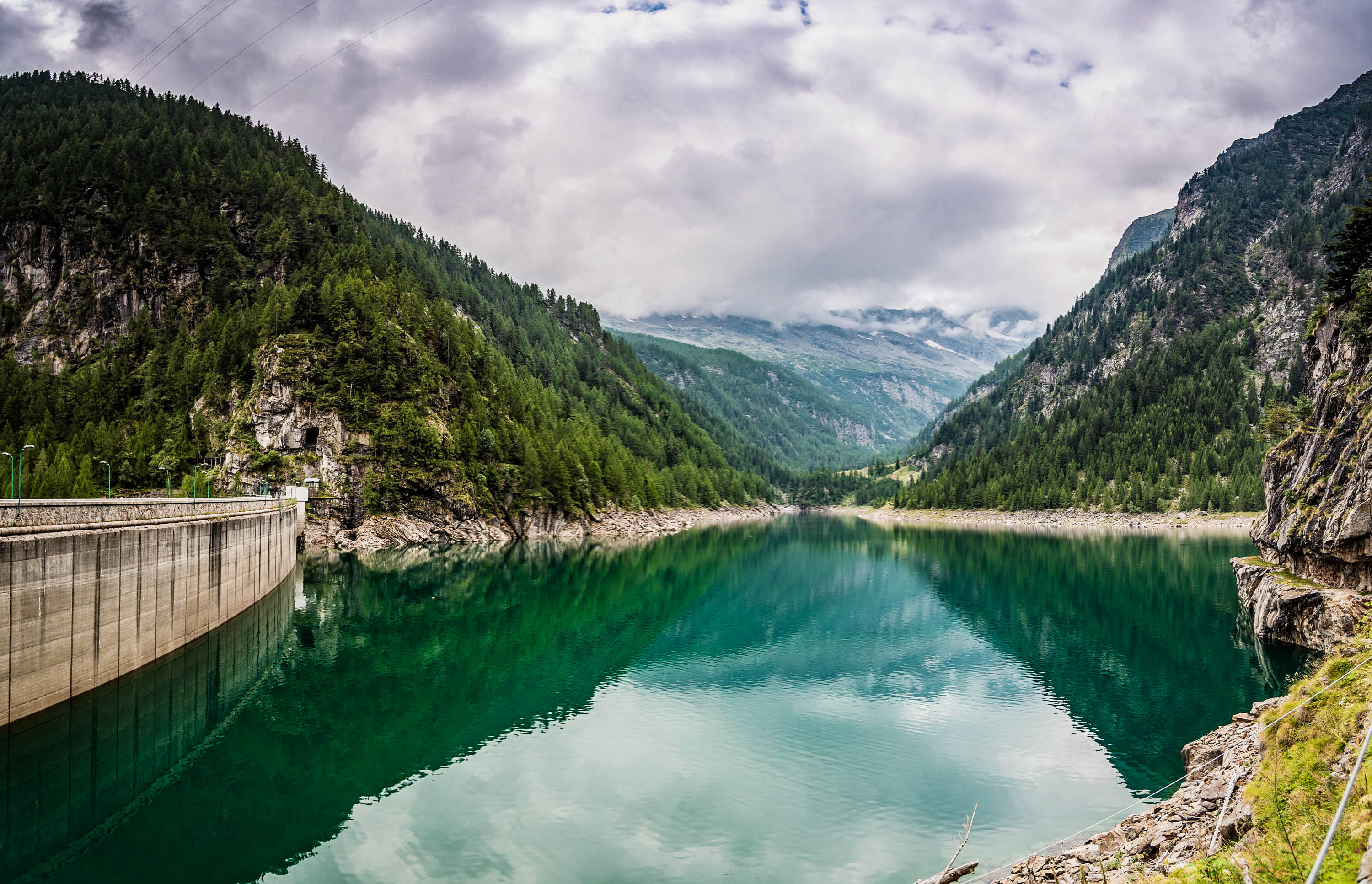
Lake Campliccioli.

In addition to the Troncone, Lake Campliccioli is also fed by the outlet of Lake Camposecco, also used for hydroelectric power. After passing the Campliccioli Dam, the Troncone quickly descends to Lake Antrona and ultimately to its outlet at the Ovesca River.

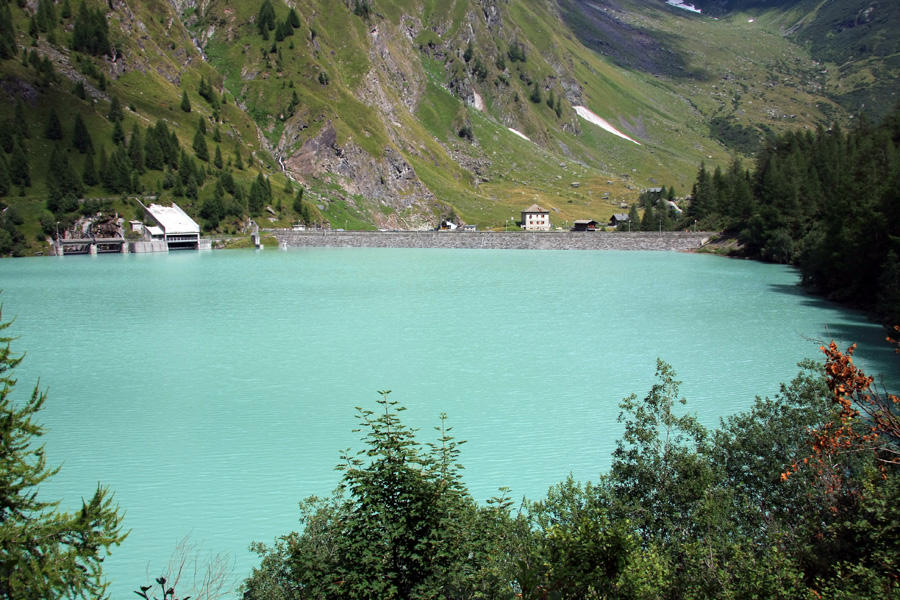
The Alpe dei Cavalli lake, or Lake Cheggio; the largest in the Valle Antrona.

The Ovesca then reaches Antronapiana and receives one of its largest tributaries from the north: the Loranco. The stream rises at the foot of Pizzo d'Andolla and near Alpe Cheggio is dammed to form Lake Alpe dei Cavalli (or Lake Cheggio); the largest body of water in the Antrona Valley and also used for hydroelectric power. After passing the dam, the Loranco flows through the pastures of Alpe Cheggio and Alpe di Campo, finally reaching Antronapiana. After receiving the Loranco, the Ovesca continues down the valley, receiving various tributaloreries from both sides. Downstream from Montescheno, it receives its largest tributary: the Brevettola River, which rises on the slopes of Pizzo San Martino and then flows past the hamlets of Montescheno.

The Ovesca River then leaves the Antrona Valley and descends into the Ossola Valley, where it flows into the Toce River after passing through Villadossola.

=== Climate ===
The Antrona Valley has a typically Alpine climate with long, harsh, snowy winters and cool, rainy summers. Precipitation is frequent and the valley sports one of the highest average annual rainfall in Italy. Rainfall is more frequent in autumn, especially in October, often causing serious problems such as flooding and landslides. Snow covers the valley's main peaks for long periods and in the coldest months it also falls to the valley floor. The highest peaks also feature some small glaciers. In winter the valley bottoms are often covered by a thick layer of ice that only melts in late spring.

== Monuments and Places of Interest ==
The entrance to the Antrona Valley is located in Villadossola but the valley itself begins in the Montescheno comune. This municipality is a cluster of hamlets nestled among orchards, pastures, and chestnut groves. The first town you come across is Cresti, the seat of the municipality, which also houses the Parish Church of Saints John the Baptist and Charles. From Cresti, a secondary road leads to Sasso, Barbuniga, Vallemiola, Valleggia, and Zonca. Vallemiola enjoys a sunny position and houses the Oratory of the Madonna delle Grazie and two large ancient wine presses. One of the presses has recently been restored. In Valleggia, there is an ancient wine press and a typical hamlet's bread oven. Barbuniga also has a press, still in excellent condition, built in 1745 and no longer in use since 1980. Barbuniga also features a traditional bread oven, and before World War II, there was also a large hamlet still for the production of grappa, of which no trace remains today. The hamlet of Zonca can only be reached on foot, and it houses two presses and two hamlet ovens.

After passing Montescheno, you enter the former municipality of Seppiana (now part of the new Borgomezzavalle comune), which was once the only parish church in the entire valley. In the center of the village stands the ancient 11th-century parish church of Saint Ambrose. The center of Seppiana also features a couple of ancient buildings with frescoes and an arched portal. In the locality of Le Selve, there is a 12th-century crucifix, while in the locality of San Rocco, there is a 17th-century oratory.

The next town after Seppiana is Viganella (also part of Borgomezzavalle), home to the former Valle Antrona Mountain Community. Given Viganella's limited sunlight (during the winter months), a project was developed to install a 40-square-meter mirror on the mountain opposite the town (about 870 meters away and 480 meters above sea level). This reflects the sun onto the town square, providing light for several hours a day. The centre of Viganella is home to the 16th-century parish church of the Nativity of the Virgin Mary and several ancient buildings of interesting architecture. Numerous chapels and oratories are found throughout the municipality, among which the 17th-century buildings of San Domenico and San Giulio stand out.

After passing Viganella, one enters Antrona Schieranco, another comune consisting of a cluster of hamlets and villages: San Pietro, Prabernardo (Inferiore and Superiore), Schieranco, Madonna, Locasca, Rovesca, Antronapiana, Antrona Lago, Cheggio, Ronco, Arvina, and Cimallegra.

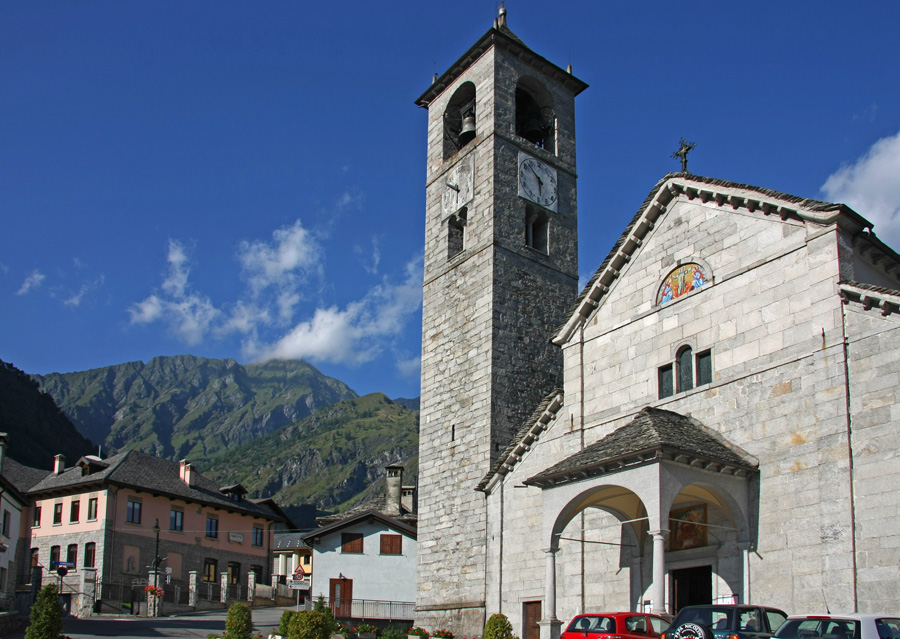
Church of San Lorenzo in Antronapiana.

After passing San Pietro, with its eponymous church, one reaches Prabernardo, where a turnoff leads to Schieranco. Continuing along the main road, one comes across Madonna, with its 16th-century Church of the Blessed Virgin of Mount Carmel; Locasca, with the 17th-century Church of San Francesco and the Madonna della Neve; and Rovesca, with the 16th-century Oratory of San Gottardo. After passing these hamlets, one reaches Antronapiana, seat of the municipality of Antrona Schieranco and the capital of the Antrona Valley. In this hamlet are the 13th-century parish church of San Lorenzo and the 17th-century oratories of Saint Anna and the Beata Vergine della Neve. From Antronapiana, you can climb to Cheggio, home to the 17th-century Oratory of San Bernardo. In winter skiing is possible via a ski lift.

== Economy ==
Tourism is the basis of the valley's economy with the greatest employment opportunities found in the valley floor in the municipality of Villadossola. Mining played a major role in the past: from 1736 to 1936, gold mines operated in the Antrona Schieranco comune, and mica mines from 1922 to 1960. Evidence of the former woodworking industry also remains. The early 20th century saw the beginning of the exploitation of the catchment areas and reservoirs (both artificial and natural) for hydroelectric power are still active, including Lake Antrona.

== Demographics ==
The valley is located in the Province of Verbano-Cusio-Ossola, in the Piedmont region of Italy. It is politically divided into three municipalities: Antrona Schieranco, Montescheno and Borgomezzavalle.

The table gives figures for the three municipalities that form part of the Antrona Valley (as of 30 November 2021):

Coat of Arms	Comune	Population (Inhabitants)	Area (km²)	Density (people/km²)	Altitude (m above s.l.)	Lowest Altitude (m above s.l.)	Maximum Altitude (m above s.l.)
	Antrona Schieranco	402	100.18	4.01	902	590	3513
	Montescheno	383	22.17	17.3	512	372	2399
	Borgomezzavalle	293	19,.08	15.4	582	389	2261
Total	–	1078	141.43	7.6	-	372	3513

== List of Settlements ==
Frazione in the Villadossoloa comune:

- Boschetto
- Cresti

In the Borgomezzavalle comune:

- Seppiana
- Camblione
- Viganella
- Rivera

In the Antrona Schieranco comune:

- San Pietro
- Schieranco
- Antronapiana

== Maps ==
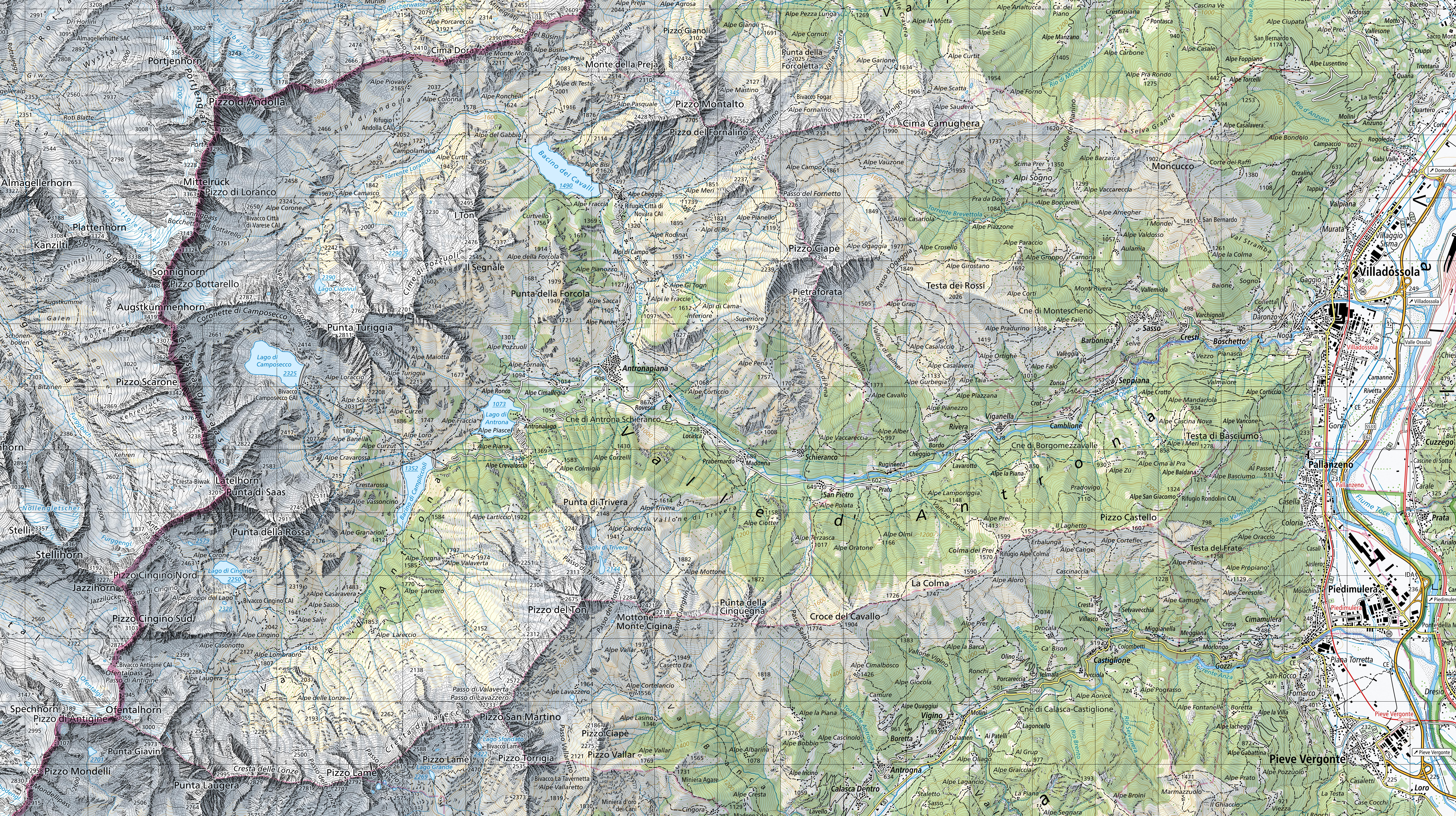
2015 Swisstopo map of the Antrona Valley, Piedmont, Italy, showing the Italian-Swiss Border on the west, Valle Anzasca on the south and Ossola Valley on the east.

== See also ==
- Val d'Ossola
- Valle Anzasca
- Val Bognanco

== Bibliography ==
- Robilant, Nicolis de; Benoît, Esprit (1786). "Essai géographique suivi d'une topographie souterraine, minéralogique et d'une docimasie des États de S.M. en terre ferme" [Geographical essay followed by an underground topography, mineralogical and a docimasia of the States of S.M. on the mainland]. Mémoires de l'Académie Royale des Sciences. 1: 191–304.
- Rosina, Gaetano (1819). Osservazioni e ricerche mineralogico-chimiche sopra alcune valli dell'Ossola [Mineralogical-chemical observations and research above some valleys of the Ossola] (in Italian). Giovanni Pirotta.
