= Antrona =

Antrona may refer to:

- Antrona Schieranco, comune in the Province of Verbano-Cusio-Ossola in the Italian region Piedmont
- Alta Valle Antrona Natural Park, nature reserve in Piedmont, in Italy
- Valle Antrona, a valley in the Province of Verbano-Cusio-Ossola in the Italian region Piedmont
