= Bogna (river) =

River in Italy

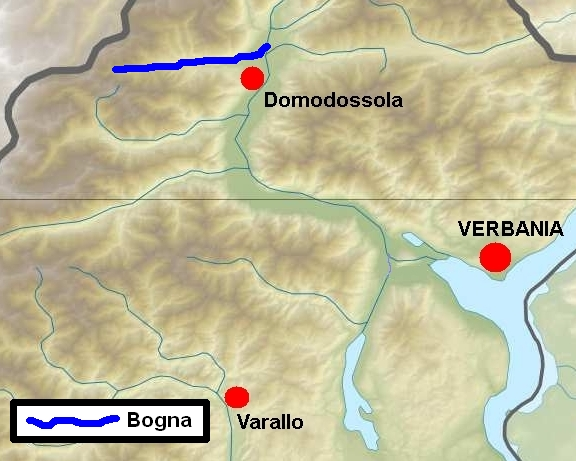
- Location within NE Piedmont

Location
- Country: Italy

Physical characteristics
- Source
  - location: Alpe Preia
  - elevation: 2,500 m (8,200 ft)
- Mouth: Toce
  - coordinates: 46°07′40″N 8°17′49″E

Basin features
- Progression: Toce→ Lake Maggiore→ Ticino→ Po→ Adriatic Sea

The Bogna is an Alpine torrent of the Ossola in northern Italy. It flows through the Val Bognanco (to which it gives its name) and into the river Toce near the city of Domodossola as a right tributary. The river starts at Monte Bardo, has a length of about 12 miles, and is known as an "unjust river" (Italian: iniquo fiume) for the destructive floods it has caused in Domodossola for centuries.

As the river runs through the entire Bognanco Valley and crosses the municipalities of Bognanco, Domodossola and Crevoladossola. A 1,300 m-long (4,300 ft) wall, the muraccio, was built in the late 18th century to protect the city of Domodossola from the floods of the river. In the 19th century, a remarkable bridge, a masterpiece of architecture, stood over Bogna.

== Sources ==
- Bertolotto, Paolo Lorenzo; Mercalli, Luca; Berro, Daniele Cat; Mosello, Rosario; Rogora, Michela (December 2014). "La serie climatica ultracentenaria di Domodossola - Collegio Rosmini, 1871-2013" (PDF). Nimbus 72 (in Italian). XXII (2): 4–45.
- Fabi, Massimo (1852). Corografia d'Italia: ossia cran dizionario storico-geografico-statistico delle citta Borghi, ... (in Italian). Pagnoni.
- "Un cuore di pietra a nostra difesa". I Racconti del Viandante (in Italian). 2016-12-17.
