= Cima del Rosso =

Mountain in Switzerland

- Location within Alps

Highest point
- Elevation: 2,624 m (8,609 ft)
- Prominence: 232 m (761 ft)
- Coordinates: 46°6′54.4″N 8°6′35.9″E

Geography
- Location: Valais, Switzerland; Piedmont, Italy
- Parent range: Pennine Alps

The Cima del Rosso is a mountain of Pennine Alps, located on the border between Switzerland and Italy. It lies between the Val Divedro (Valais) and the Val Bognanco (Piedmont), east of the Portjengrat.
