= Ovesca =

River in Italy

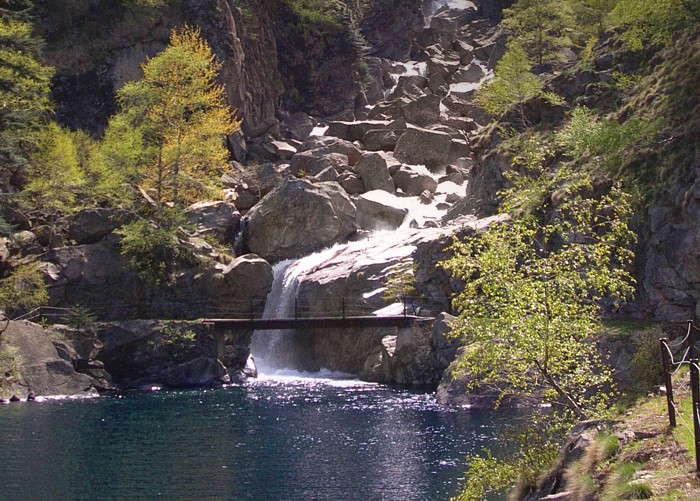

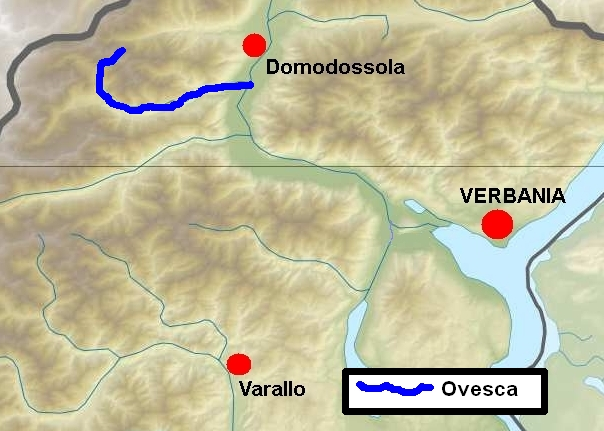
- Location within NE Piedmont

Location
- Country: Italy

Physical characteristics
- Source
  - location: Lago di Antrona
  - elevation: 1,073 m (3,520 ft)
- Mouth: Toce
  - coordinates: 46.067907°N 8.281775°E
- Length: 26.5 km (16.5 mi)

Basin features
- Progression: Toce→ Lake Maggiore→ Ticino→ Po→ Adriatic Sea

The Ovesca is a 26.5-kilometre (16.5 mi) Alpine torrent of the Ossola in northern Italy. It flows from the Lago di Antrona through the Valle Antrona and into the river Toce, of which it is a right tributary.
