= Adeliza de Borgomanero =

Italian murderer (c. 1350 – c. 1370)

Adeliza de Borgomanero (c. 1350 – c. 1370) was an Italian murderer. The wife of a count from the Val d'Ossola region, she was exiled to a remote castle at Bellagio, near Lake Como, because of her iniquitous behaviour.

Adeliza held court at the castle, taking lovers as she chose. Legend turned her into a vampire-siren figure in popular lore, and she was said to have ordered her lovers to commit suicide the morning after their sexual revels. Those that chose to refuse this option were dropped through an oubliette into the lake below.

== Bibliography ==
- Edgcumbe Staley, Lords and Ladies of the Italian Lakes, (London: John Long, 1912), p. 170.
