= Saas-Almagell =

- Municipality
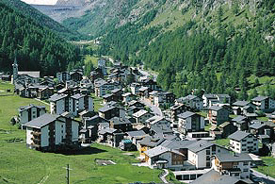

- Flag Coat of arms
- Location of Saas-Almagell
- Location within Switzerland Location within Canton of Valais
- Coordinates: 46°5.66′N 7°57.43′E
- Country: Switzerland
- Canton: Valais
- District: Visp

Area
  - Total: 110.28 km^{2} (42.58 sq mi)
- Elevation: 1,672 m (5,486 ft)

Population (December 2002)
  - Total: 399
  - Density: 3.62/km^{2} (9.37/sq mi)
- Time zone: UTC+01:00 (CET)
  - Summer (DST): UTC+02:00 (CEST)
- Postal code: 3905
- SFOS number: 6288
- ISO 3166 code: CH-VS
- Surrounded by: Antrona Schieranco (IT-VB), Ceppo Morelli (IT-VB), Macugnaga (IT-VB), Saas Fee, Saas Grund, Simplon, Täsch, Zermatt, Zwischbergen
- Website: www.saas-almagell.org

Saas-Almagell is a municipality in the district of Visp in the canton of Valais in Switzerland.

== History ==
Saas-Almagell is first mentioned in 1291 as Armenzello. In 1307 it was mentioned as Almenkel.

The settlement, at the upper end of the Saastal, was relatively isolated for much of its history. A road suitable for motor vehicles was completed in 1948, whilst the village did not have its own school until 1958. The local economy was boosted in the 1960s by the construction of the Mattmark Dam.

== Geography ==
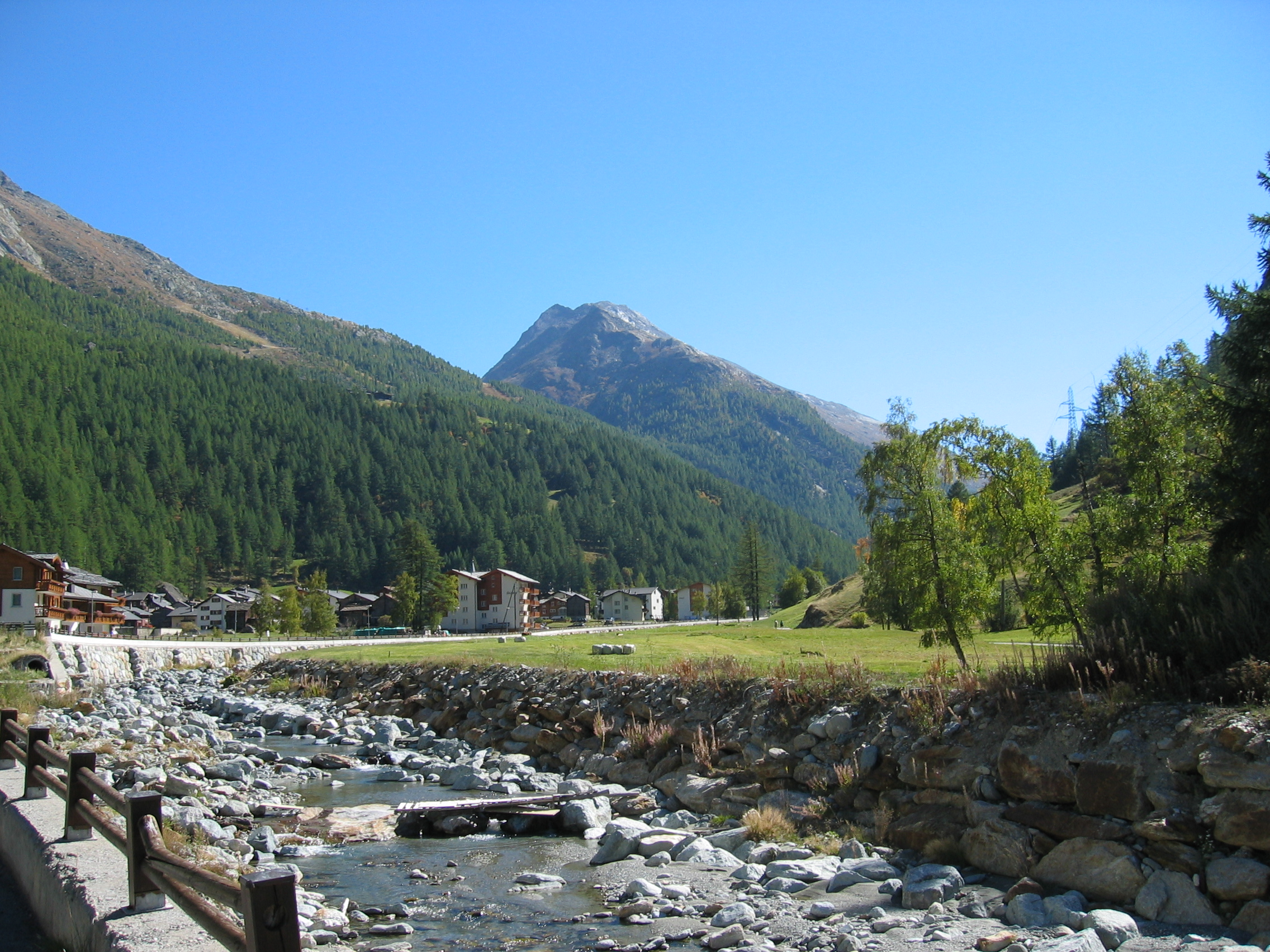
Saaser Vispa river, with Saas-Almagell in the background

Saas-Almagell has an area, as of 2011, of 110.3 square kilometers (42.6 mi^{2}). Of this area, 7.5% is used for agricultural purposes, while 4.1% is forested. Of the rest of the land, 0.5% is settled (buildings or roads) and 87.9% is unproductive land.

The municipality is located in the Visp district and is located approximately 5 km (3.1 mi) from Saas-Fee. It is the southernmost municipality in the Saas valley. It consists of the village of Saas-Almagell, part of the hamlet of Unter den Bodmen and the hamlets of zum Moos, Alpien and Furggstalden.

Saas Almagell lies in the Pennine Alps and the territory of the municipality encompasses a large number of summits. The highest are the Rimpfischhorn, Strahlhorn, Allalinhorn and Weissmies (all over 4,000 metres above sea level). Other important summits are the Portjengrat, Sonnighorn, Stellihorn, Egginer, Jazzihorn, Almagellhorn and Spechhorn. The Mattmarksee is the largest lake in the valley.

== Coat of arms ==
The blazon of the municipal coat of arms is Argent a Wyvern displayed Gules, on a chief of the second a Cross couped of the first.

== Demographics ==
Saas-Almagell has a population (as of December 2020) of 364. As of 2008, 7.7% of the population are resident foreign nationals. Over the last 10 years (2000–2010 ) the population has changed at a rate of -9%. It has changed at a rate of 0% due to migration and at a rate of -4.1% due to births and deaths.

Most of the population (as of 2000) speaks German (384 or 96.7%) as their first language, Serbo-Croatian is the second most common (4 or 1.0%) and Italian is the third (3 or 0.8%). There is 1 person who speaks French.

Of the population in the municipality, 276 or about 69.5% were born in Saas-Almagell and lived there in 2000. There were 71 or 17.9% who were born in the same canton, while 19 or 4.8% were born somewhere else in Switzerland, and 22 or 5.5% were born outside of Switzerland.

As of 2000, children and teenagers (0–19 years old) make up 25.7% of the population, while adults (20–64 years old) make up 56.9% and seniors (over 64 years old) make up 17.4%.

As of 2000, there were 164 people who were single and never married in the municipality. There were 206 married individuals, 25 widows or widowers and 2 individuals who are divorced.

As of 2000, there were 143 private households in the municipality, and an average of 2.7 persons per household. There were 31 households that consist of only one person and 19 households with five or more people. In 2000, a total of 139 apartments (50.4% of the total) were permanently occupied, while 110 apartments (39.9%) were seasonally occupied and 27 apartments (9.8%) were empty. As of 2009, the construction rate of new housing units was 16 new units per 1000 residents. The vacancy rate for the municipality, in 2010, was 0.69%.

The historical population is given in the following chart:

== Sports ==
It is the starting point for the small independent ski area of Fugglstalden-Heidbodme which is also part of the combined Saasquistal ski region, albeit connected to the other parts of the region by postal boat, rather than dedicated skilifts. As well as downhill skiing and snowboarding pistes, it has uphill skiing and sledging trails. It was the early home of the famous Swiss skier Pirmin Zurbriggen.

== Politics ==
In the 2007 federal election the most popular party was the CVP which received 62.57% of the vote. The next three most popular parties were the FDP (17.7%), the SVP (16.18%) and the SP (3.47%). In the federal election, a total of 199 votes were cast, and the voter turnout was 70.8%.

In the 2009 Conseil d'État/Staatsrat election a total of 258 votes were cast, of which 14 or about 5.4% were invalid. The voter participation was 91.8%, which is much more than the cantonal average of 54.67%. In the 2007 Swiss Council of States election a total of 199 votes were cast, of which 2 or about 1.0% were invalid. The voter participation was 71.1%, which is much more than the cantonal average of 59.88%.

== Economy ==
Saas-Almagell has a small town square with a grocery store, bank, and souvenir shops, as well as tourist accommodations. It has a youth hostel and sports center.

As of 2010, Saas-Almagell had an unemployment rate of 3.8%. As of 2008, there were 18 people employed in the primary economic sector and about 5 businesses involved in this sector. 43 people were employed in the secondary sector and there were 4 businesses in this sector. 164 people were employed in the tertiary sector, with 28 businesses in this sector. There were 175 residents of the municipality who were employed in some capacity, of which females made up 34.3% of the workforce.

In 2008 the total number of full-time equivalent jobs was 184. The number of jobs in the primary sector was 9, all of which were in agriculture. The number of jobs in the secondary sector was 40 of which 33 (82.5%) were in construction. The number of jobs in the tertiary sector was 135. In the tertiary sector; 3 or 2.2% were in wholesale or retail sales or the repair of motor vehicles, 15 or 11.1% were in the movement and storage of goods, 103 or 76.3% were in a hotel or restaurant, 2 or 1.5% were technical professionals or scientists, 12 or 8.9% were in education.

In 2000, there were 43 workers who commuted into the municipality and 73 workers who commuted away. The municipality is a net exporter of workers, with about 1.7 workers leaving the municipality for every one entering. Of the working population, 9.1% used public transportation to get to work, and 39.4% used a private car.

== Religion ==
From the 2000 census, 370 or 93.2% were Roman Catholic, while 11 or 2.8% belonged to the Swiss Reformed Church. Of the rest of the population, there were 6 members of an Orthodox church (or about 1.51% of the population). There was 1 individual who was Islamic. 3 (or about 0.76% of the population) belonged to no church, are agnostic or atheist, and 6 individuals (or about 1.51% of the population) did not answer the question.

== Education ==
In Saas-Almagell about 153 or (38.5%) of the population have completed non-mandatory upper secondary education, and 27 or (6.8%) have completed additional higher education (either university or a Fachhochschule). Of the 27 who completed tertiary schooling, 88.9% were Swiss men, 11.1% were Swiss women.

During the 2010–2011 school year there were a total of 25 students in the Saas-Almagell school system. The education system in the Canton of Valais allows young children to attend one year of non-obligatory Kindergarten. During that school year, there were no kindergarten classes (KG1 or KG2) and there were no kindergarten students. The canton's school system requires students to attend six years of primary school. In Saas-Almagell there were a total of 2 classes and 25 students in the primary school. The secondary school program consists of three lower, obligatory years of schooling (orientation classes), followed by three to five years of optional, advanced schools. All the lower and upper secondary students from Saas-Almagell attend their school in a neighboring municipality.

As of 2000, there were 30 students in Saas-Almagell who came from another municipality, while 20 residents attended schools outside the municipality.

== Tourism ==
Saas-Almagell is located in the saas valley in Switzerland in the canton Valais. It is located around 1672 meters above sea level. It is considered a part of the tourist area of Saas-Fee/Saastal, a tourist destination all year round. With its location in the Pennine Alps, many people visit Saas-Almagell to hike or to climb mountains, ski-ing and other activities. The village also retain traditional Valais architecture, including timber chalets and wooden granaries.
