= Almagellhorn =

Mountain in Switzerland

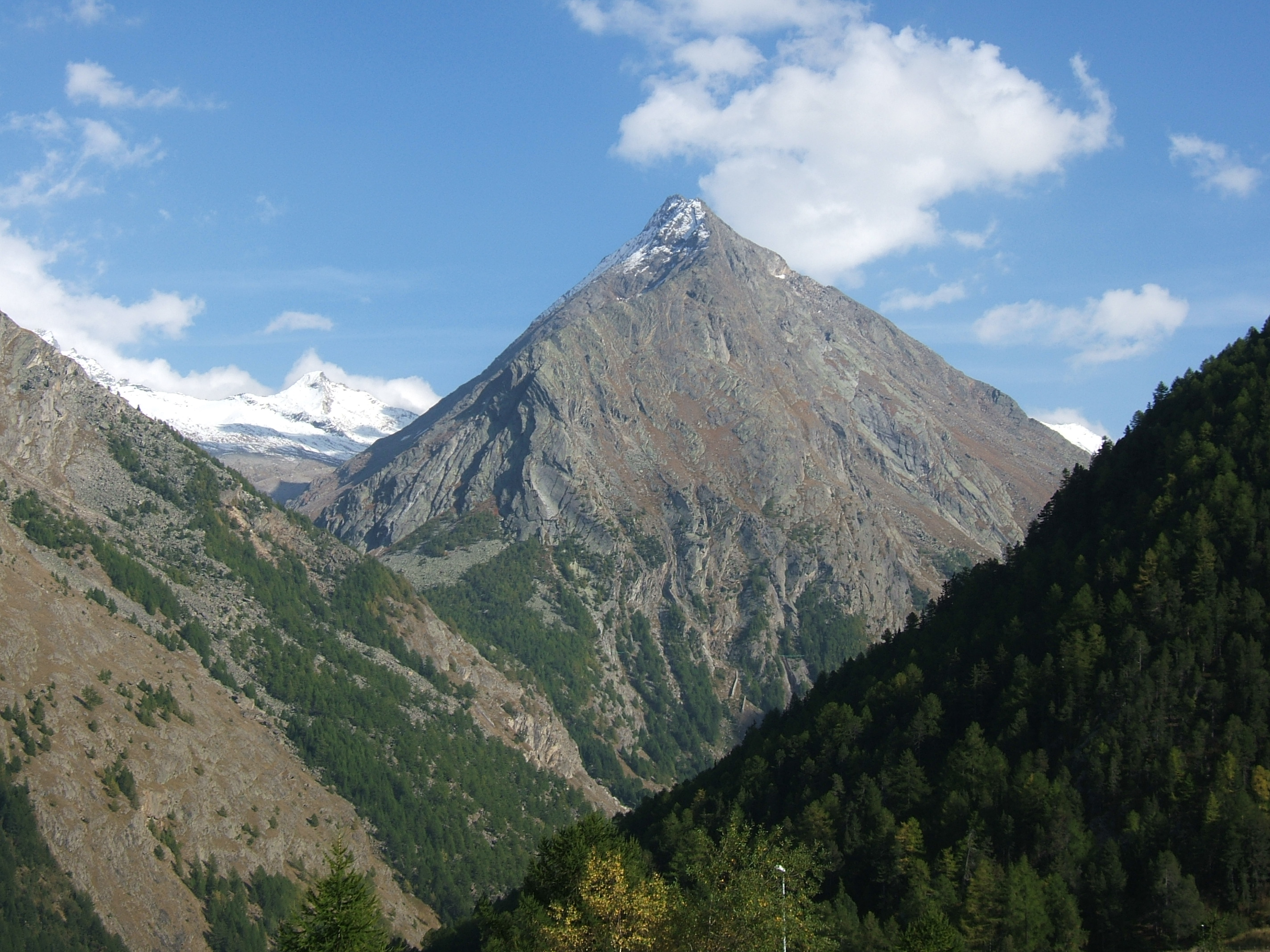
- Almagellhorn from Saas Fee

Highest point
- Elevation: 3,327 m (10,915 ft)
- Prominence: 138 m (453 ft)
- Parent peak: Sonnighorn
- Coordinates: 46°05′13″N 7°59′40″E

Geography
- Location within Switzerland
- Location: Valais, Switzerland
- Parent range: Pennine Alps

The Almagellhorn (or Almagellerhorn) (3,327 m) is a mountain of the Pennine Alps, overlooking Saas Almagell, in the canton of Valais.
