= Montescheno =

- Comune
- Comune di Montescheno
- Location within Italy Location within Piedmont
- Coordinates: 46°4′N 8°14′E
- Country: Italy
- Region: Piedmont
- Province: Province of Verbano-Cusio-Ossola (VB)
- Frazioni: Barboniga, Cad Mater, Cat Pera, Cresti, Croppo, Ovesco, Progno, Sasso, Selve, Valeggia, Vallemiola, Zonca

Area
  - Total: 22.5 km^{2} (8.7 sq mi)
- Elevation: 512 m (1,680 ft)

Population (December 2004)
  - Total: 452
  - Density: 20.1/km^{2} (52.0/sq mi)
- Demonym: Monteschenesi
- Time zone: UTC+1 (CET)
  - Summer (DST): UTC+2 (CEST)
- Postal code: 28030
- Dialing code: 0324

Montescheno is a comune (municipality) in the Valle Antrona, Province of Verbano-Cusio-Ossola in the Italian region Piedmont, located about 120 kilometres (75 mi) northeast of Turin and about 30 kilometres (19 mi) northwest of Verbania. As of 31 December 2004, it had a population of 452 and an area of 22.5 square kilometres (8.7 mi^{2}).

The municipality of Montescheno contains the frazioni (subdivisions, mainly villages and hamlets) Barboniga, Cad Mater, Cat Pera, Cresti, Croppo, Ovesco, Progno, Sasso, Selve, Valeggia, Vallemiola, and Zonca.

Montescheno borders the following municipalities: Antrona Schieranco, Bognanco, Borgomezzavalle, Domodossola, Villadossola.

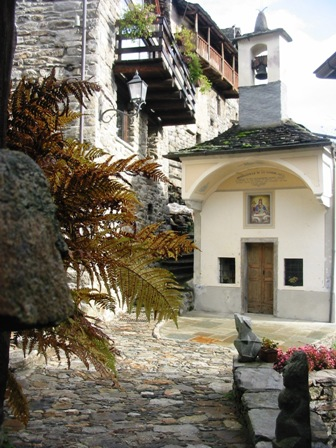
Valeggia in Montescheno

== Demographic evolution ==
Historical population

Year	Pop.	±%
1861	961	—
1871	859	−10.6%
1881	850	−1.0%
1901	852	+0.2%
1911	827	−2.9%

Year	Pop.	±%
1921	830	+0.4%
1931	716	−13.7%
1936	694	−3.1%
1951	758	+9.2%
1961	692	−8.7%

Year	Pop.	±%
1971	627	−9.4%
1981	558	−11.0%
1991	460	−17.6%
2001	441	−4.1%

Source: Data from ISTAT
