= Trasquera =

- Comune
- Comune di Trasquera
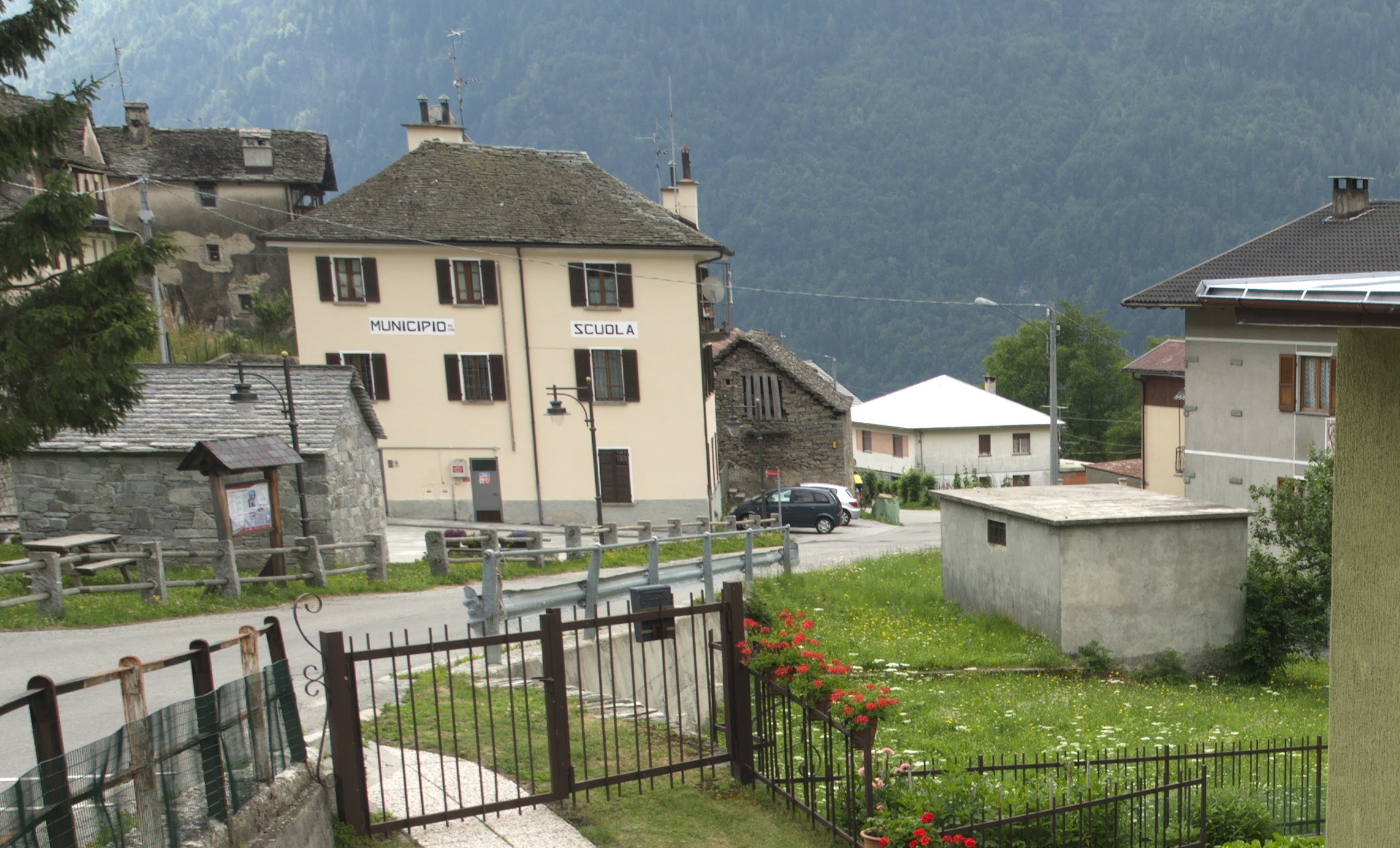

- Coat of arms

- Location within Italy Location within Piedmont
- Coordinates: 46°8′N 8°12′E
- Country: Italy
- Region: Piedmont
- Province: Verbano-Cusio-Ossola (VB)
- Frazioni: Iselle, Paglino

Government
  - Mayor: Geremia Magliocco

Area
  - Total: 39.3 km^{2} (15.2 sq mi)
- Elevation: 1,100 m (3,600 ft)

Population (Dec. 2004)
  - Total: 247
  - Density: 6.28/km^{2} (16.3/sq mi)
- Demonym: Trasqueresi
- Time zone: UTC+1 (CET)
  - Summer (DST): UTC+2 (CEST)
- Postal code: 28030
- Dialing code: 0324

Trasquera is a comune (municipality) in the Province of Verbano-Cusio-Ossola in the Italian region Piedmont, located about 120 kilometres (75 mi) northeast of Turin and about 35 kilometres (22 mi) northwest of Verbania, in the Val Divedro, on the border with Switzerland.

Trasquera borders the following municipalities: Bognanco, Crevoladossola, Domodossola, Varzo, Zwischbergen (Switzerland).
