= Villadossola =

- Comune
- Comune di Villadossola
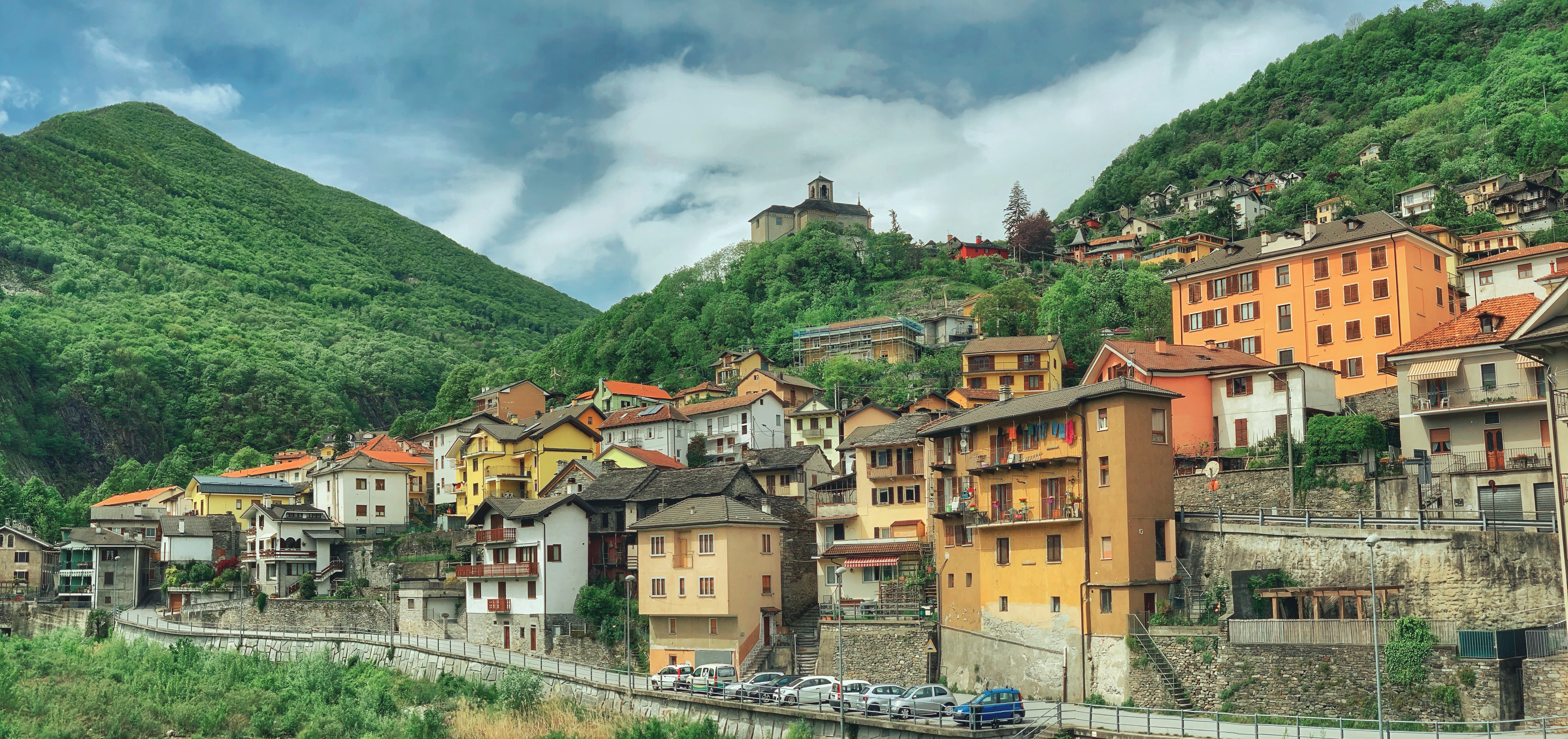

- Coat of arms

- Location within Italy Location within Piedmont
- Coordinates: 46°3′N 8°15′E
- Country: Italy
- Region: Piedmont
- Province: Verbano-Cusio-Ossola (VB)
- Frazioni: Boschetto, Noga, Piaggio, Villa Sud, Villaggio, Gaggio, Falghera

Government
  - Mayor: Bruno Toscani

Area
  - Total: 18.73 km^{2} (7.23 sq mi)
- Elevation: 257 m (843 ft)

Population (28 February 2017)
  - Total: 6,655
  - Density: 355.3/km^{2} (920.3/sq mi)
- Demonym: Villadossolesi or Villesi
- Time zone: UTC+1 (CET)
  - Summer (DST): UTC+2 (CEST)
- Postal code: 28844
- Dialing code: 0324
- Patron saint: Saint Bartholomew
- Saint day: 24 August
- Website: Official website

Villadossola (Piedmontese Vila d'Òssola) is a town and comune of the Val d’Ossola in the Province of Verbano-Cusio-Ossola, Piedmont, northern Italy, some 120 kilometres (75 mi) northeast of Turin. It stands just south of Domodossola, to the west of the Toce, and at the mouth of the picturesque Valle Antrona, one of the seven side valleys of the Val d’Ossola.

In the past this was an important centre for the iron and steel, and chemical industries. Today the local economy is focused on the tertiary sector and many of the industrial buildings have been converted to other uses: the town's theatre, La Fabbrica, is based in a former factory.

Villadossola borders the following communes: Beura-Cardezza, Borgomezzavalle, Domodossola, Montescheno, Pallanzeno.

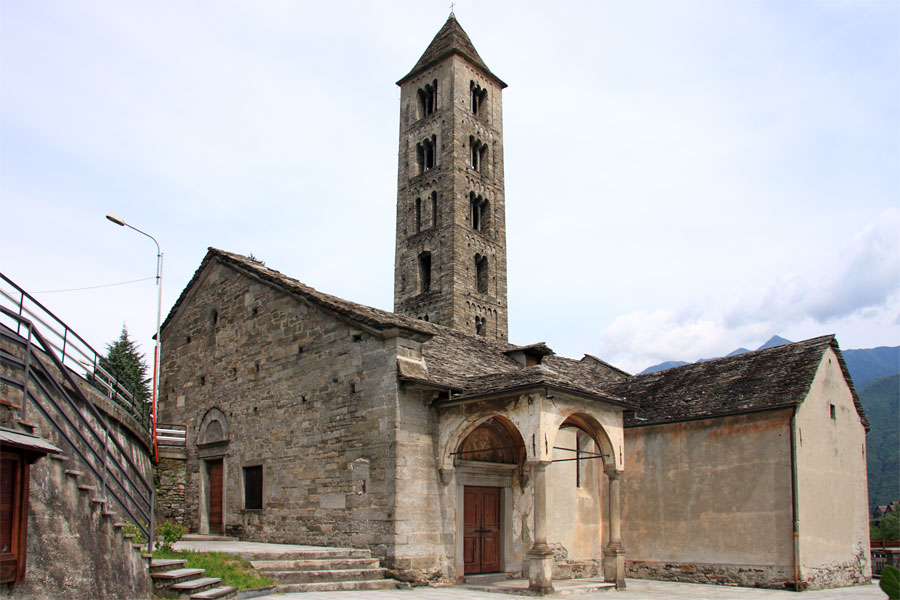
Church of San Bartolomeo

== Twin towns and sister cities ==
Villadossola is twinned with:

- Mercato Saraceno, Italy, since 2010
