= Ossolano =

Ossolano is the Western Lombard dialect spoken in the Ossola valley, Northwest Italy.

It is an umbrella name for a number of dialects spoken in the main Ossola valley and the other seven valleys and their subvalley that spread from it. As the territory is very mountainous, many different variations exist. They are mostly intelligible to one another, save for some specific words that seem to have arisen only in some villages and not others. For instance, "cat" in mainstream Ossolano is gatt, but in Mozziese it is sciandron (the "cinder-one", due to domesticated mountain cats' habit to roll up in front of the fire in mountain huts).

Perhaps the most famous poet in Ossolano is Giovanni Leoni (affectionately known as ol Torototella, "the Bard"), a merchant, sea farer and alpinist who is still known among the locals.
