= Jazzihorn =

Mountain in Switzerland

- Pizzo Cingino Nord
- Location within Alps

Highest point
- Elevation: 3,227 m (10,587 ft)
- Prominence: 37 m (121 ft)
- Parent peak: Stellihorn
- Coordinates: 46°01′53″N 8°00′43″E

Geography
- Location: Valais, Switzerland; Piedmont, Italy
- Parent range: Pennine Alps

The Jazzihorn is a mountain of the Pennine Alps, located on the Swiss-Italian border. On the Italian side it is named Pizzo Cingino Nord as another summit is named Pizzo Cingino Sud on the south. The Jazzihorn has an elevation of 3,227 metres above sea level and lies between the valleys of Saastal (Valais) and Valle d'Antrona (Piedmont).
