= Latelhorn =

Mountain in Switzerland

- Punta di Saas
- Location within Alps

Highest point
- Elevation: 3,204 m (10,512 ft)
- Prominence: 66 m (217 ft)
- Parent peak: Weissmies
- Coordinates: 46°02′43″N 8°02′04″E

Geography
- Location: Valais, Switzerland; Piedmont, Italy
- Parent range: Pennine Alps

The Latelhorn (also known as Punta di Saas) is a mountain of the Pennine Alps, located on the border between Switzerland and Italy. It lies between the valleys of Saas (Valais) and Antrona (Piedmont), just north of the Antrona Pass.
