= Gondo Gold Mine =

Gold mine in Switzerland

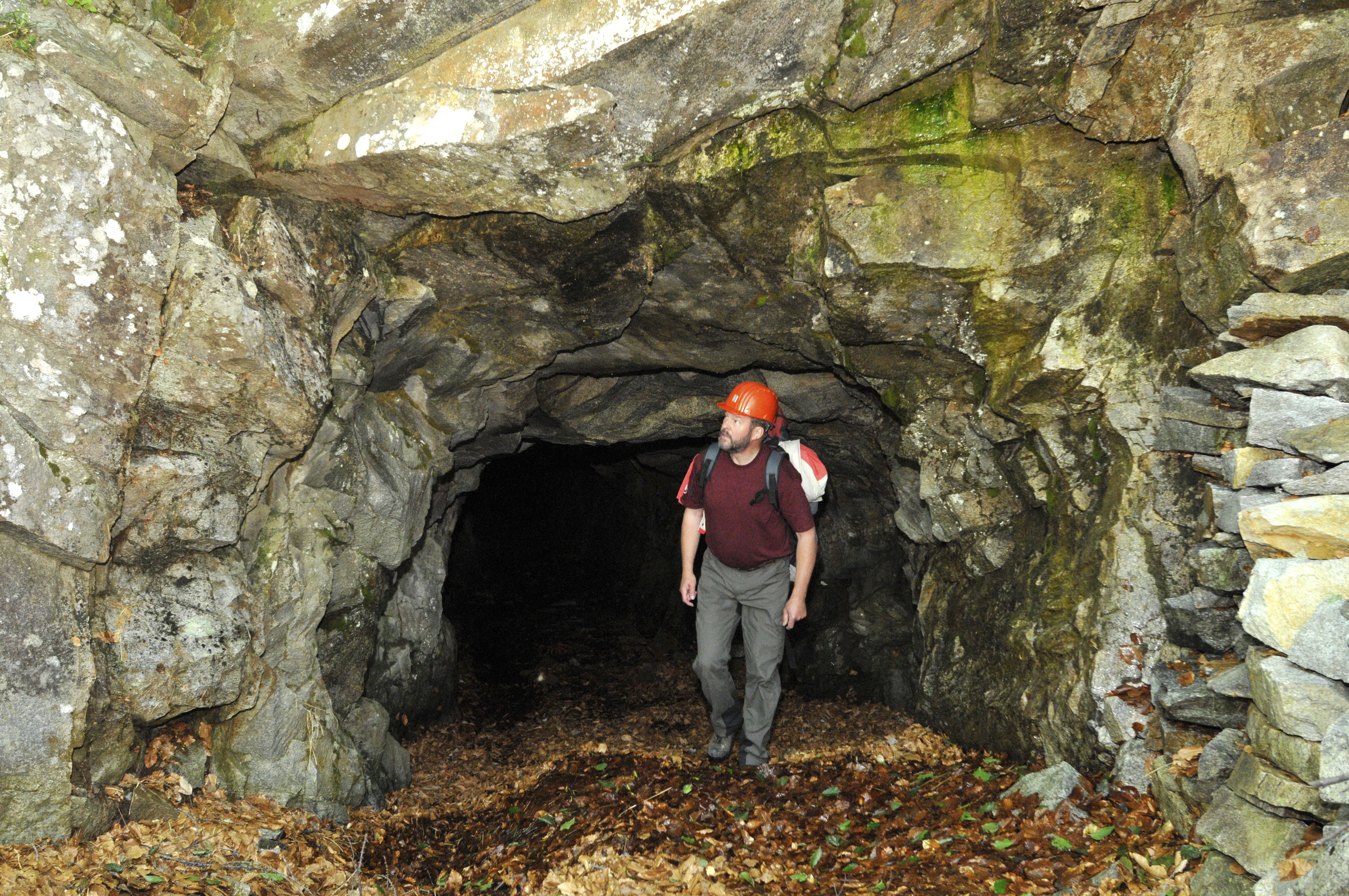
- Tunnel entrance to one of the Gondo Gold Mines

- Location in Switzerland
- Location: Gondo, Switzerland; 46°11′18″N 008°08′26″E
- Products: Gold,
- Opened: ca. 1660
- Closed: 1897
- Website: German Page about Gondo Gold Mine

The Gondo Gold Mine was the largest gold mine in Switzerland. The mine is located in the south of the canton of Valais near the Italian border at over 1200 m above sea level. In its heyday up to 500 men worked here, while the municipality of Gondo itself had only 100 inhabitants.

== History ==
Gondo Gold was obviously already known to the Romans and Gold ore was probably mined in the Zwischbergen valley as early as the Middle Ages. Gold from the Gondo Gold Mine is mixed with pyrite and silver and bound to veins of quartz. Through the centuries the prospecting rights changed several times.

Gold mining has been documented since the 17th century. Among others, the famous Kaspar Jodok von Stockalper (1609–1691) from the city of Brig was the owner of the Gondo Gold Mine. Stockalper paid the workers half a silver crown for every hundredweight of broken ore. Stockalper's descendants retained the mineral rights in the 18th and the first half of the 19th century.

In 1810 Valais was part of the French Empire and the "Département du Simplon". The Maffiola family, originally from Italy, worked as sub-concessionaires for the Stockalper family in Zwischenbergen. With 15 workers, the family made good profits, but had to move out after a dispute with the owners, not before having filled in the shafts and tunnels.

The Stockalper family ceded their concession to a French company in 1840. On February 16, 1875, the Société anonyme des Mines d'Or de Gondo was founded under the direction of the banker Eduard Cropt from Sion. After Cropt's death, the concession of the mine passed to the Société des Mines d'Or d'Helvétie in autumn 1881.

== Climax ==
At the height of the Gondo gold rush in 1894, the Paris-based Société des Mines d'Or de Gondo SA took over the plant. At that time up to 500 men worked in the valley. With his announcement that he had found a "new California", the director was able to raise 5 million francs in capital and hire English specialists. In 1893 the general manager of the mine Alcide Froment wrote:

“Gondo takes first place among all gold mines in Europe. You only have to show the small capitalists in Europe that it is no longer necessary to go to California or to the Transvaal to look for the precious metal.” – Alcide Froment

New smelting plants were built. The stamp mills and stone mills were powered by water power and electricity. Miners dug for gold in the rugged rock faces and tunnels. The ore was transported to the bottom of the valley with an invention that was revolutionary at the time, the cable car.

The gold deposits in the Zwischbergental were mined at altitudes of 1200 m to 1600 m. Mining took place in approximately 50 opencast mines and in 40 tunnels. The gold content could vary from a few grams to 30 grams per ton of ore.

In the tunnels, which drop steeply into the Earth's interior and are named Silzaly, Bruno, Fumée, Fontaine, Julie, Maffiola, Rona, Camozetta, Alcide and Minna and Vinasque, the workers toiled in 12-hour shifts for a meager wage, while the operators, in anticipation of rich profits, indulged in luxury and well-being. It soon turned out, however, that the gold extraction was not worthwhile. In the period from March 1, 1894, to August 1896, the gold mine processed just over 5000 tons of ore. In the short time the company won 33 kg of raw gold.

== Bankruptcy ==
The Gondo gold mines were considered a marvel of engineering at the time. From 1897, the gold content per ton of ore fell rapidly. On May 17, 1897, after only three years of activity, the last company, the Société des Mines d'Or de Gondo SA, went bankrupt. An Italian foundry company dismantled the plant during the First World War.

== Today ==
A museum about the former gold mine was set up in the Hotel Stockalperturm in Gondo. Enthusiasts are still looking for gold in the Zwischbergental today.

== Photos ==
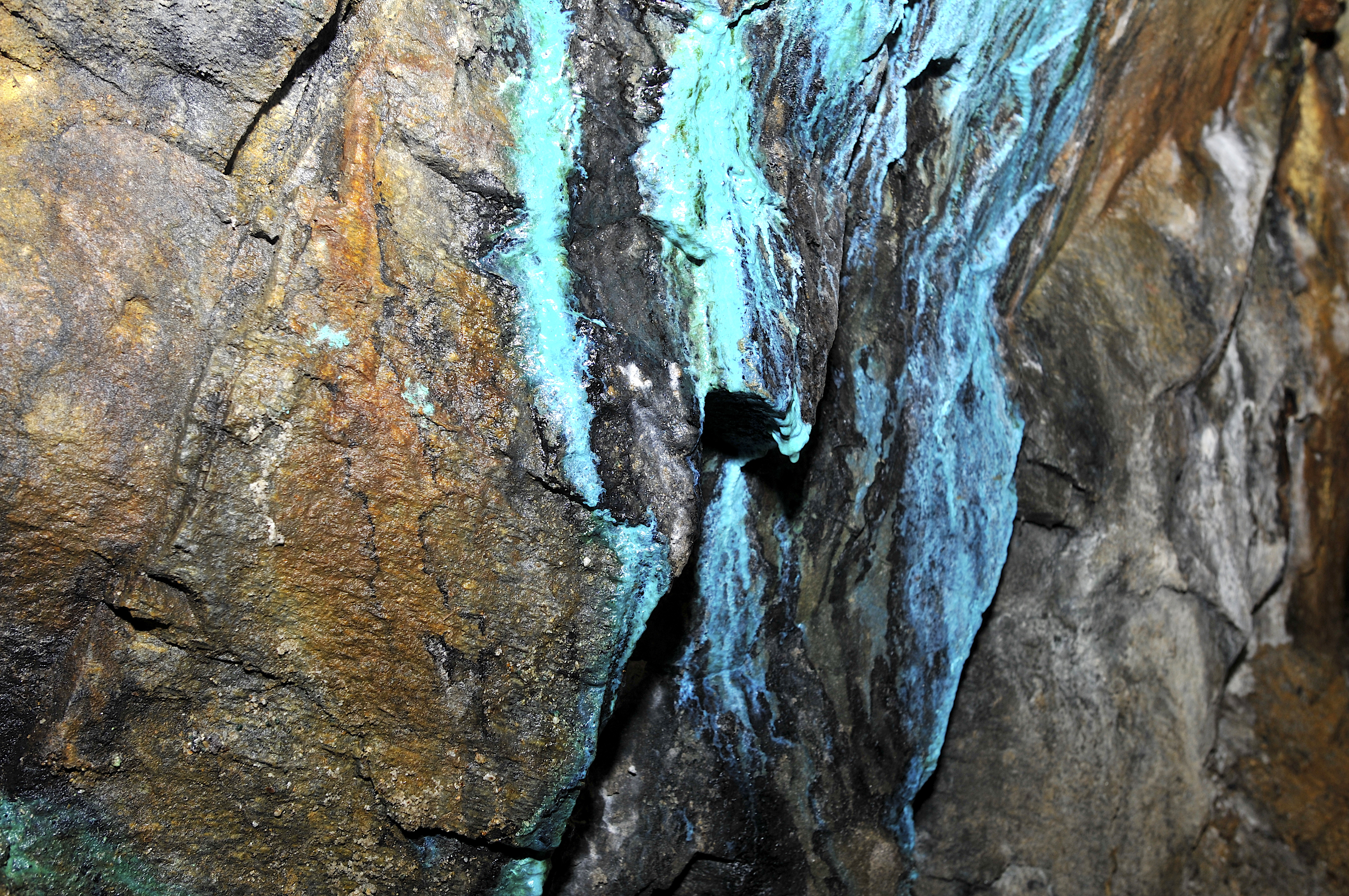
Azurite

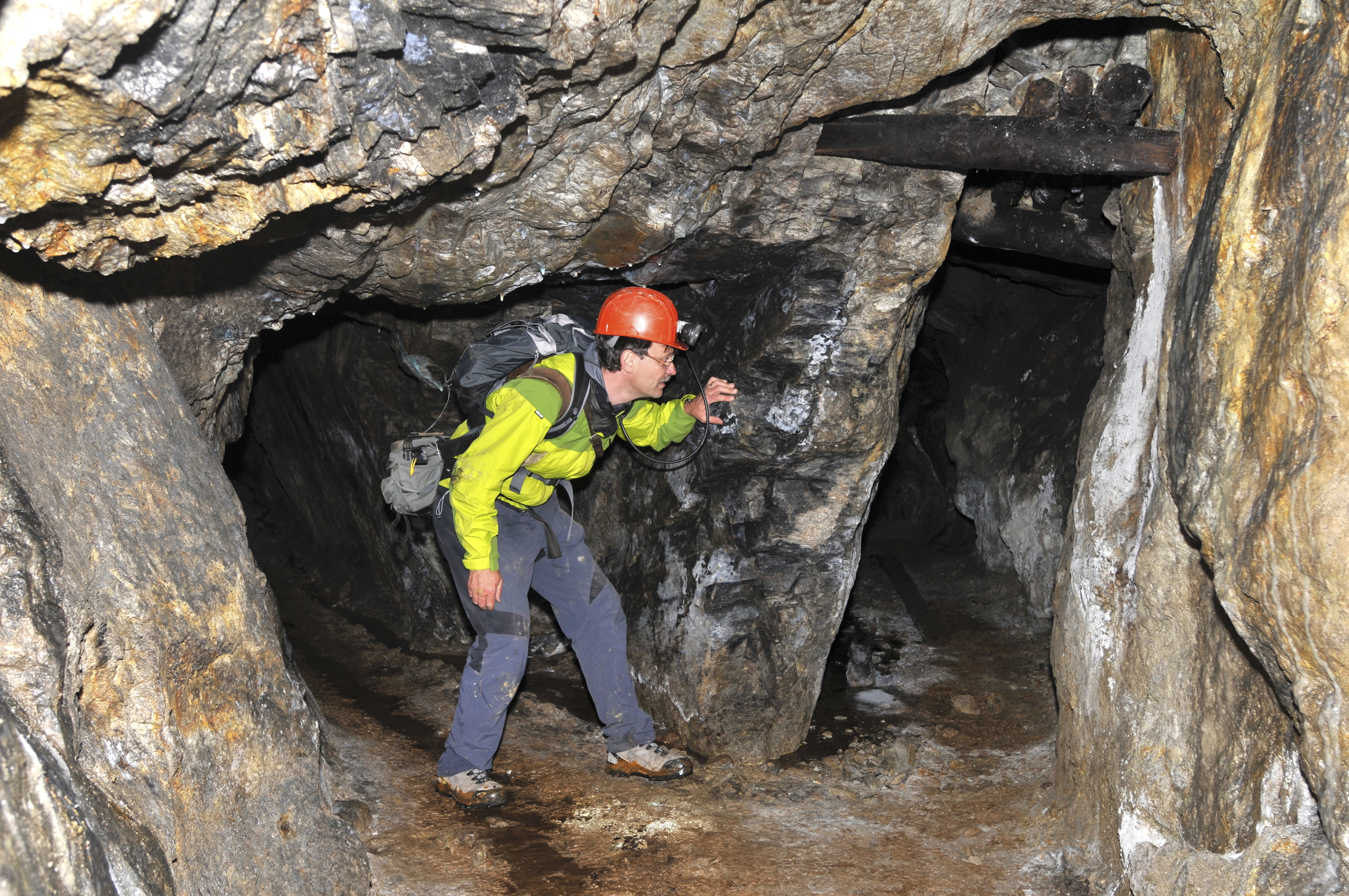
Interior of a gold mine tunnel in Gondo

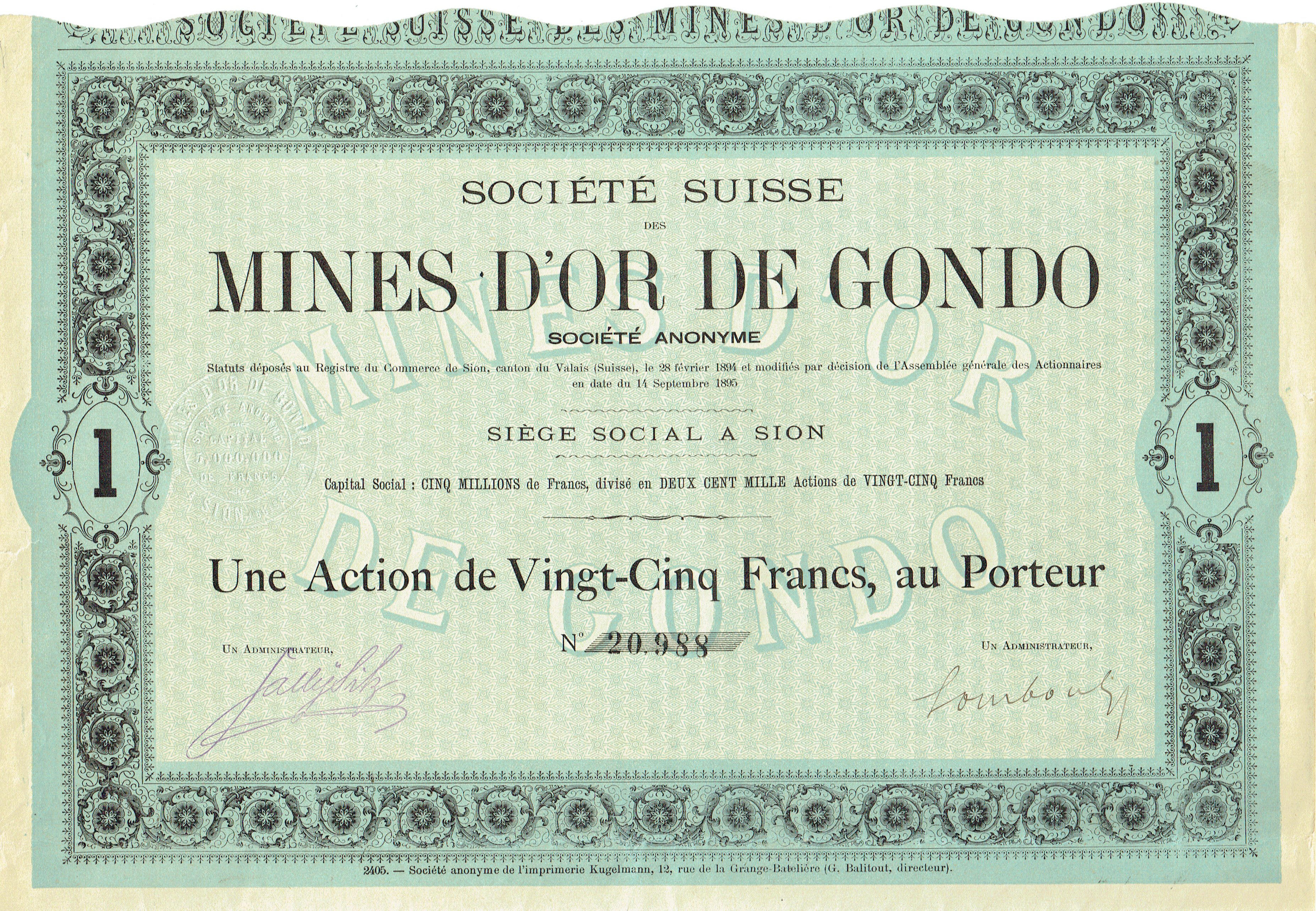
Share certificate for 25 Swiss Francs of Société Suisse des Mines d'Or de Gondo SA from 14. September 1895
