= Zwischbergen =

- Municipality
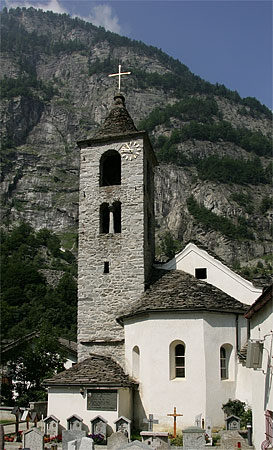
- Gondo church

- Flag Coat of arms
- Location of Zwischbergen
- Location within Switzerland Location within Canton of Valais
- Coordinates: 46°10′N 8°7′E
- Country: Switzerland
- Canton: Valais
- District: Brig

Government
  - Mayor: President; Roland Squaratti

Area
  - Total: 86.2 km^{2} (33.3 sq mi)
- Elevation: 1,359 m (4,459 ft)

Population (December 2002)
  - Total: 127
  - Density: 1.47/km^{2} (3.82/sq mi)
- Time zone: UTC+01:00 (CET)
  - Summer (DST): UTC+02:00 (CEST)
- Postal code: 3901
- SFOS number: 6011
- ISO 3166 code: CH-VS
- Localities: Gondo
- Surrounded by: Antrona Schieranco (IT-VB), Bognanco (IT-VB), Ried-Brig, Saas Almagell, Simplon, Trasquera (IT-VB), Varzo (IT-VB)
- Website: www.gondo.ch

Zwischbergen is a municipality in the district of Brig in the canton of Valais in Switzerland.

== History ==
=== Gondo ===
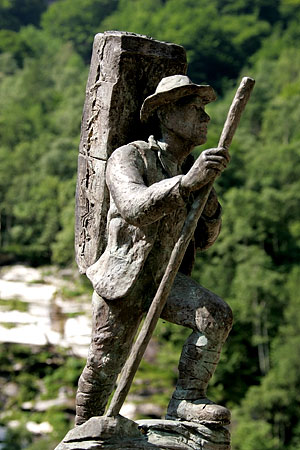
Smuggler statue in Gondo

The village of Gondo, which is part of Zwischbergen, is located at the southern foot of the Simplon Pass on the Italian border. Although the majority language has been German for a long time, the population is partly of Italian descent. Gondo belonged to the dominion of Novara, until Boniface de Challant, the Bishop of Sion, bought the rights to the village in 1291 from Count de Castello. However, the parish of Gondo first belonged to the diocese of Sion in 1822. For much of the history of the village a school was held in the rectory, but in 1958 a schoolhouse was built.

A new church was built in 1495 in the village. Disagreements over appointing the administrators of the new church in the middle of the 15th Century led to the creation of a municipal corporation and municipal statutes.

Some of the families in Simplon and Gondo became wealthy through freight transport and smuggling over the pass. With their wealth, they became an important part in the political landscape of Valais. Between 1550 and 1897 there were gold mines in the valley. Starting in 1640 a postal riders between Lyon and Milan stopped in Gondo.

In the 18th and 19th Centuries the village was hit by devastating avalanches. On 14 October 2000, a third of the village was destroyed by a landslide that claimed 13 lives and destroyed eight buildings, including the western part of the Stockalper tower, which was built in 1650.

== Geography ==
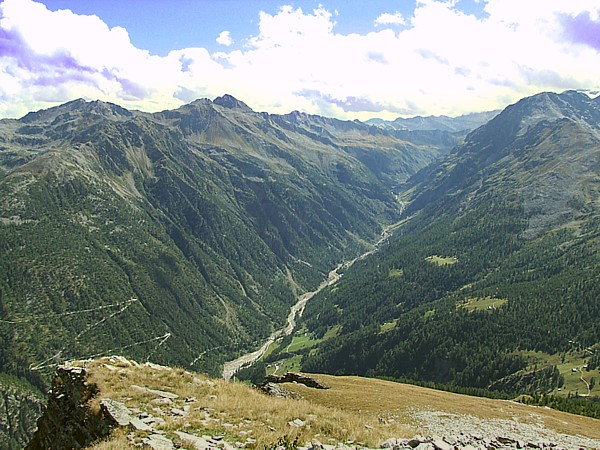
Valley of Zwischbergen

Zwischbergen has an area, as of 2011, of 86.1 square kilometers (33.2 mi^{2}). Of this area, 13.1% is used for agricultural purposes, while 24.4% is forested. Of the rest of the land, 0.4% is settled (buildings or roads) and 62.1% is unproductive land.

The village of Gondo, on the Simplon Pass road, is located in the municipality.

== Coat of arms ==
The blazon of the municipal coat of arms is Per fess Argent, between two Peaks Vert in chief a Sun Or, and Vert a Path Argent. Since zwischenbergen means between mountains, the two mountains on the coat of arms are an example of canting arms.

== Demographics ==
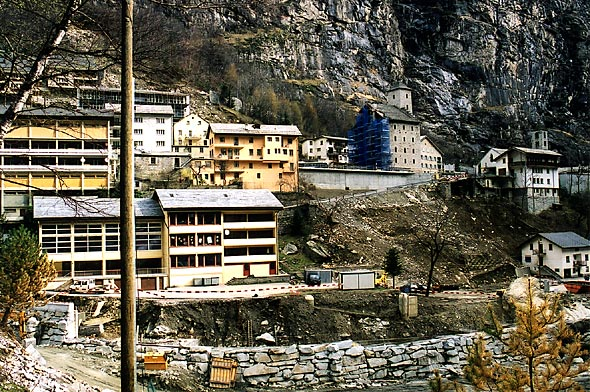
Gondo village

Zwischbergen has a population (as of December 2020) of 71. As of 2008, 12.6% of the population are resident foreign nationals. Over the last 10 years (1999–2009 ) the population has changed at a rate of -35.4%. It has changed at a rate of -24.1% due to migration and at a rate of -11.4% due to births and deaths.

Most of the population (as of 2000) speaks German (69 or 88.5%) as their first language, Italian is the second most common (4 or 5.1%) and Spanish is the third (3 or 3.8%). There is 1 person who speaks French.

As of 2008, the gender distribution of the population was 58.8% male and 41.2% female. The population was made up of 54 Swiss men (52.9% of the population) and 6 (5.9%) non-Swiss men. There were 40 Swiss women (39.2%) and 2 (2.0%) non-Swiss women. Of the population in the municipality 48 or about 61.5% were born in Zwischbergen and lived there in 2000. There were 14 or 17.9% who were born in the same canton, while 7 or 9.0% were born somewhere else in Switzerland, and 8 or 10.3% were born outside of Switzerland.

The age distribution of the population (as of 2000) is children and teenagers (0–19 years old) make up 25.6% of the population, while adults (20–64 years old) make up 59% and seniors (over 64 years old) make up 15.4%. As of 2000, there were 31 people who were single and never married in the municipality. There were 36 married individuals, 7 widows or widowers and 4 individuals who are divorced.

As of 2000, there were 31 private households in the municipality, and an average of 2.3 persons per household. There were 9 households that consist of only one person and 3 households with five or more people. Out of a total of 33 households that answered this question, 27.3% were households made up of just one person and there was 1 adult who lived with their parents. Of the rest of the households, there are 8 married couples without children, 8 married couples with children There were 4 single parents with a child or children. There was 1 household that was made up of unrelated people and 2 households that were made up of some sort of institution or another collective housing.

In 2000 there were 10 single family homes (or 25.6% of the total) out of a total of 39 inhabited buildings. There were 16 multi-family buildings (41.0%), along with 10 multi-purpose buildings that were mostly used for housing (25.6%) and 3 other use buildings (commercial or industrial) that also had some housing (7.7%).

In 2000, a total of 31 apartments (41.9% of the total) were permanently occupied, while 28 apartments (37.8%) were seasonally occupied and 15 apartments (20.3%) were empty. The vacancy rate for the municipality, in 2010, was 2.41%.

The historical population is given in the following chart:

== Heritage sites of national significance ==
The Ruin of the Gold Mine at Gondo is listed as a Swiss heritage site of national significance.

== Politics ==
In the 2015 federal election the most popular party was the SVP with 70.2% of the votes. The next three most popular parties were the CVP with 28.6%, the PES with 1.0% and the SP with 0.3%. In the federal election, a total of 40 votes were cast, and the voter turnout was 64.5%.

In the 2009 Conseil d'État/Staatsrat election a total of 48 votes were cast, of which 0 were invalid. The voter participation was 68.6%, which is much more than the cantonal average of 54.67%. In the 2007 Swiss Council of States election a total of 52 votes was cast, of which 0 were invalid. The voter participation was 74.3%, which is much more than the cantonal average of 59.88%.

== Economy ==
As of 2010, Zwischbergen had an unemployment rate of 0%. As of 2008, there were 3 people employed in the primary economic sector and about 1 business involved in this sector. 15 people were employed in the secondary sector and there was 1 business in this sector. 52 people were employed in the tertiary sector, with 11 businesses in this sector. There were 32 residents of the municipality who were employed in some capacity, of which females made up 21.9% of the workforce.

In 2008 the total number of full-time equivalent jobs was 60. The number of jobs in the primary sector was 2, all of which were in agriculture. The number of jobs in the secondary sector was 15 of which or (0.0%) were in manufacturing The number of jobs in the tertiary sector was 43. In the tertiary sector; 8 or 18.6% were in wholesale or retail sales or the repair of motor vehicles, 10 or 23.3% were in the movement and storage of goods, 9 or 20.9% were in a hotel or restaurant, 1 was the insurance or financial industry.

In 2000, there were 64 workers who commuted into the municipality and 16 workers who commuted away. The municipality is a net importer of workers, with about 4.0 workers entering the municipality for every one leaving. About 34.4% of the workforce coming into Zwischbergen are coming from outside Switzerland. Of the working population, 25% used public transportation to get to work, and 40.6% used a private car.

== Religion ==
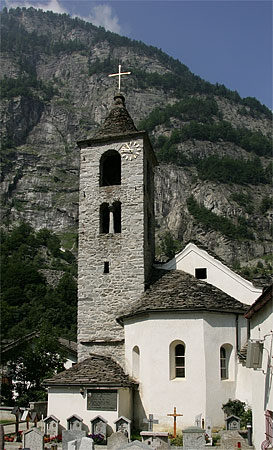
Gondo village church

From the 2000 census, 73 or 93.6% were Roman Catholic, while 1 or 1.3% belonged to the Swiss Reformed Church.

== Education ==
In Zwischbergen about 31 or (39.7%) of the population have completed non-mandatory upper secondary education, and two or (2.6%) have completed traditional higher education (either university or a Fachhochschule). Of these two, one was a Swiss man, the other was a Swiss woman.

As of 2000, there were 3 students from Zwischbergen who attended schools outside the municipality.
