= Ossola =

Valley in Italy

Coordinates: 46°17′N 8°21′E

- Val d'Ossola; Valle Ossola
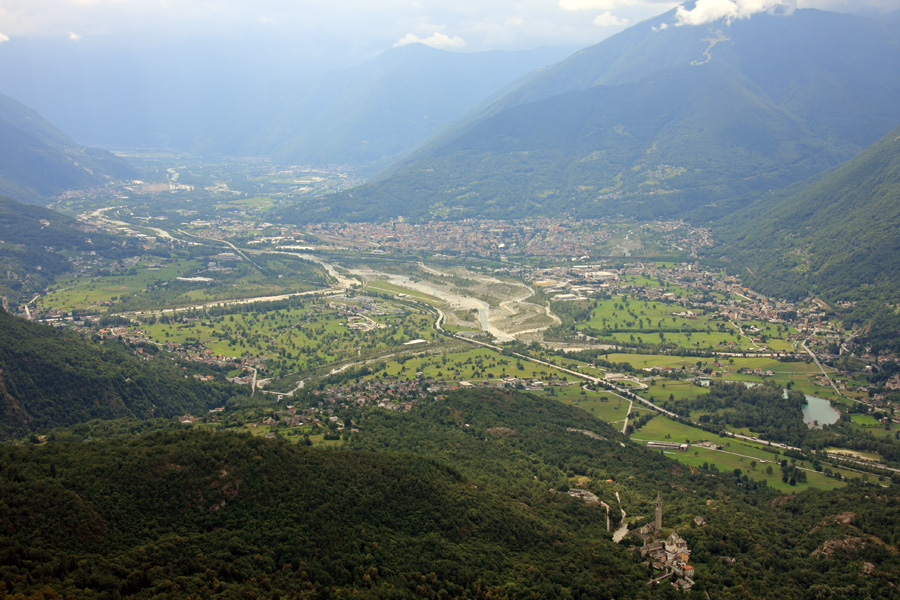
- Middle valley panorama

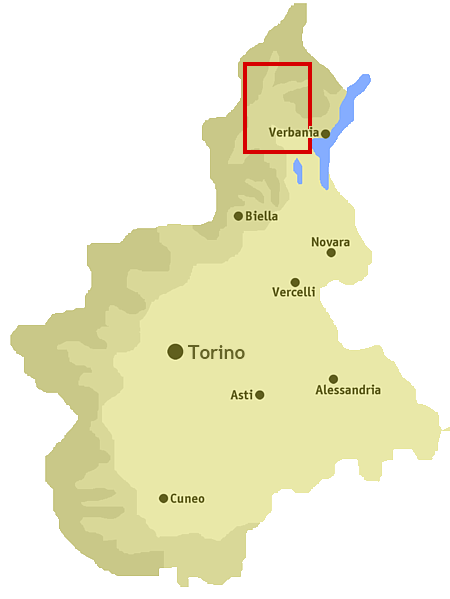
- Location of the valley in Piedmont, NW Italy
- Floor elevation: 200–4.609 m (656.17–15.12 ft)
- Long-axis direction: N - S

Naming
- Native name: Òssola (Lombard); Eschetaal (Walser)

Geography
- Location: Province of Verbano-Cusio-Ossola, Italy

The Ossola (Italian: [ˈɔssola]; Ossolano: Òssola), also Valle Ossola or Val d'Ossola (Walser: Eschetaal; German: Eschental), is an area of Northwest Italy situated to the north of Lago Maggiore. It lies within the Province of Verbano-Cusio-Ossola in the region of Piedmont. Its principal river is the Toce, and its most important town Domodossola.

== Etymology ==
There are many etymological claims as to the origins of the name Ossola, the most likely being Celtic for "high lands". The German and Walser names for the valley translate to "valley of the ash trees".

== Geography ==
Ossola is composed of one main valley (the Ossola proper) and seven side valleys: Anzasca, Antrona, Bognanco, Divedro, Antigorio, Formazza, Isorno and Vigezzo.

It is surrounded by the Pennine Alps on the western side and by the Lepontine Alps on the northern and eastern sides.

The main towns are Domodossola, Villadossola, Crevoladossola, Ornavasso and Mergozzo.

Ossola’s highest elevation is the Nordend, a peak of the Monte Rosa Massif, which is also the highest peak of Piedmont. Excluding the Monte Rosa's peaks, other important mountains are the Pizzo d'Andolla, the Monte Leone, the Corno Cieco and, in the lower part of the valley, the Monte Capezzone and the Monte Massone.

It is home to the Alpe Veglia and Alpe Devero Natural Park, Alta Valle Antrona Natural Park and also includes parts of the Val Grande National Park, Italy’s largest wilderness area.

== History ==
=== Republic of Ossola ===
Flag of the Republic of Ossola used by the Blue Brigades (September 8, 1944 - October 23, 1944)

In 1944, with the Allies of World War II still stuck south of the Apennines and Benito Mussolini's Italian Social Republic controlling all of Northern Italy, the Italian partisans staged an uprising behind German lines, led by the Committee of National Liberation of Upper Italy. This rebellion led to the establishment of a number of provisional partisan governments throughout Northern Italy, of which the Free Republic of Ossola was the most prominent. It received official recognition from Switzerland and from Allied consulates in Switzerland. Within a few weeks, German reinforcements had crushed the uprising, and the area's liberation had to wait until the final offensives of 1945.

== Maps ==
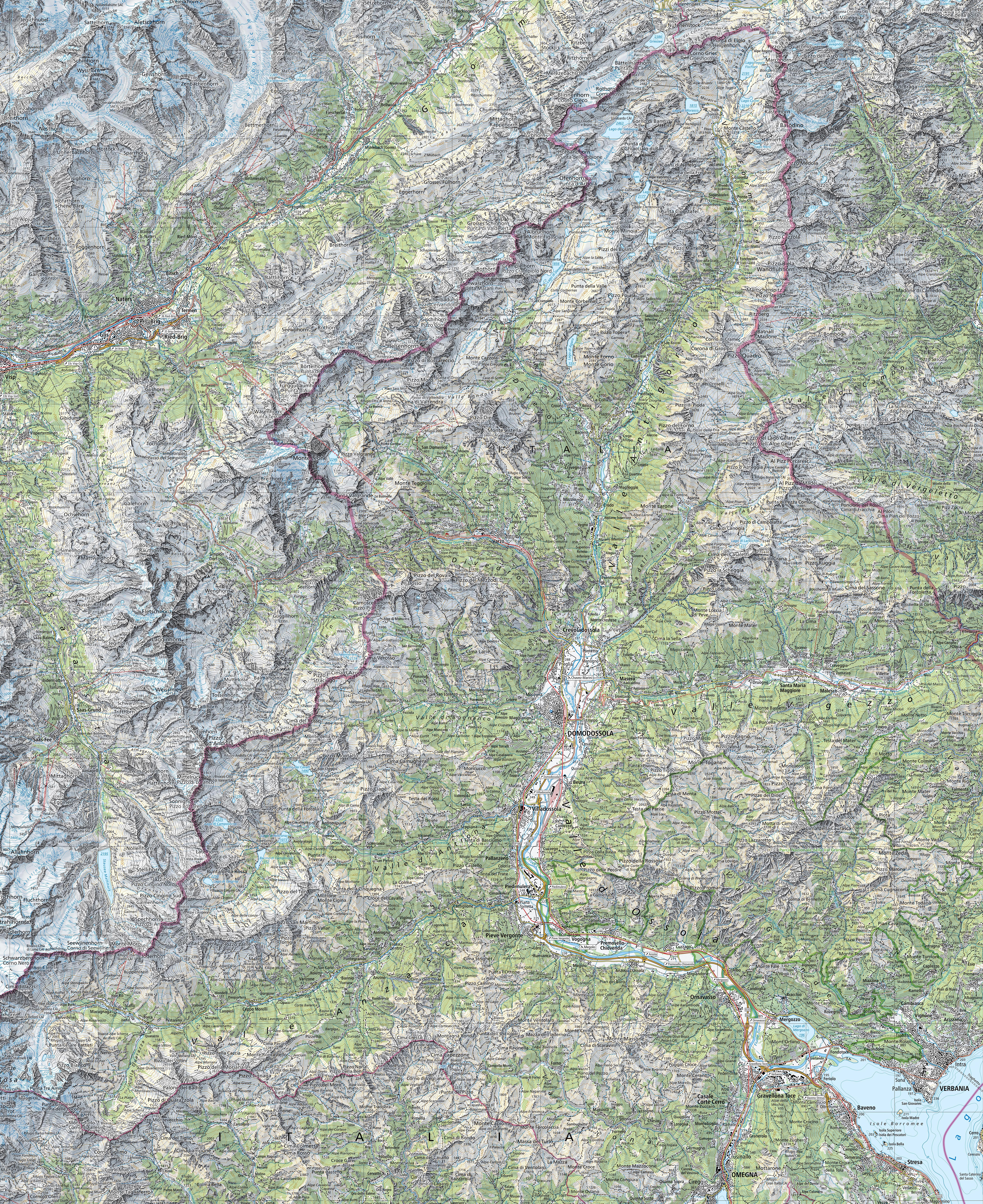
Swisstopo map of the Val d'Ossola, showing the side valleys of Anzasca, Antrona, Bognanco, Divedro, Antigorio, Formazza, Isorno and Vigezzo.

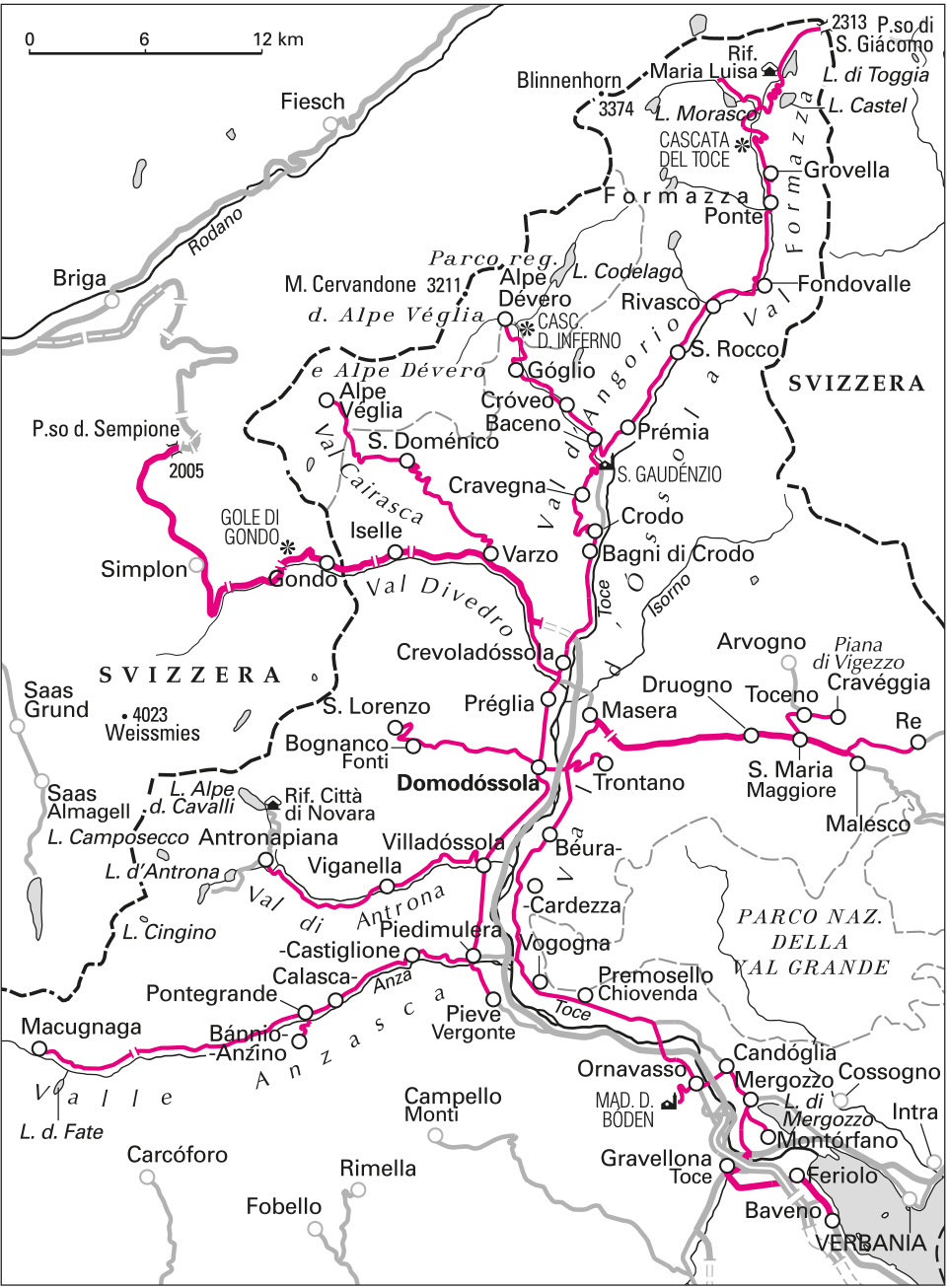
Map of the Ossola valleys
