= Alta Valle Antrona Natural Park =

Protected area in Italy

Coordinates: 46.05°N 8.08°E

- Parco naturale dell'Alta Valle Antrona
- IUCN category V (protected landscape/seascape)
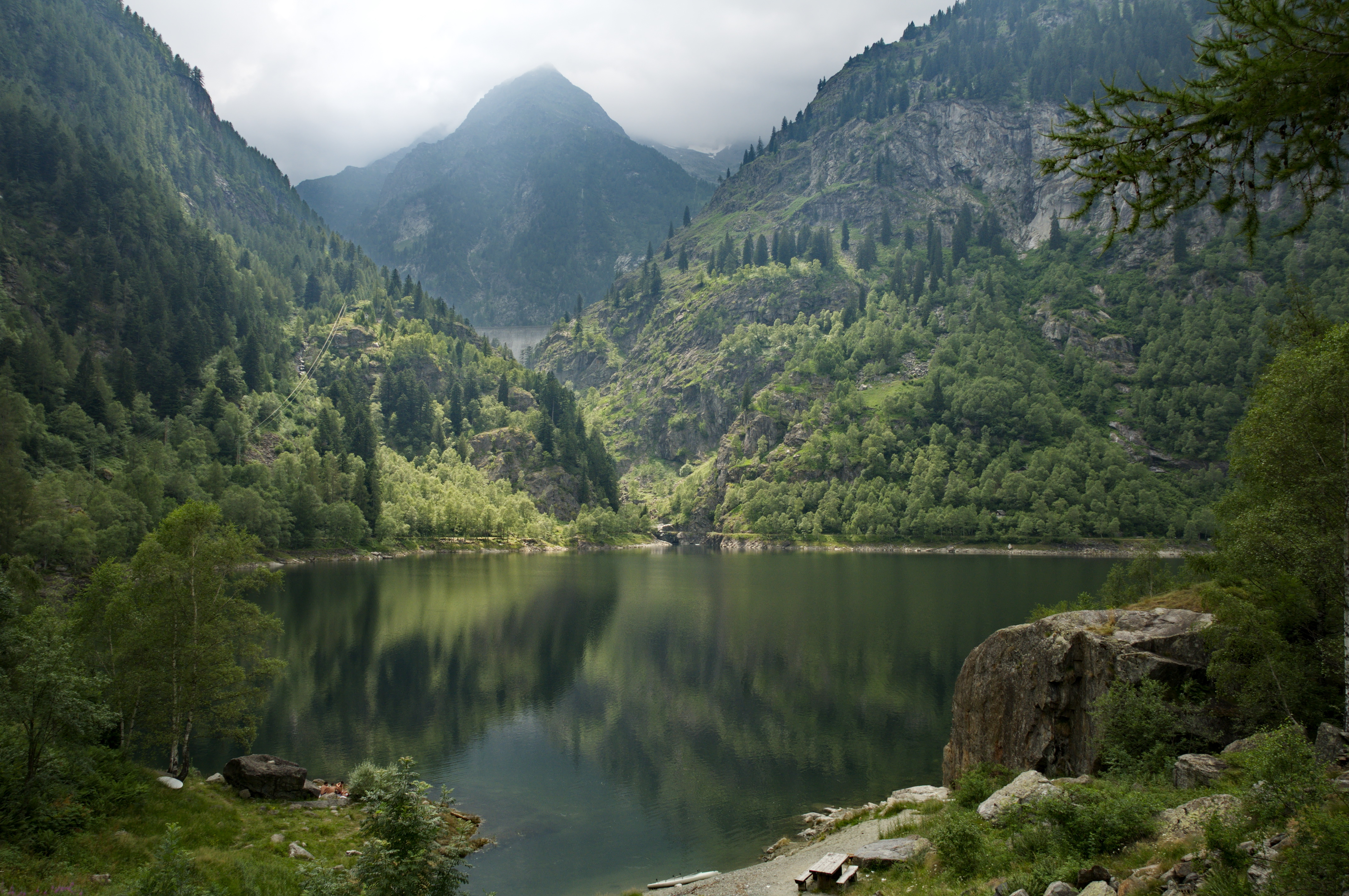
- Interactive map of Alta Valle Antrona Natural Park
- Location: Piedmont
- Nearest city: Domodossola
- Area: 7,444 ha (28.74 sq mi)
- Established: 2009
- Governing body: Ente di Gestione delle Aree Protette dell'Ossola

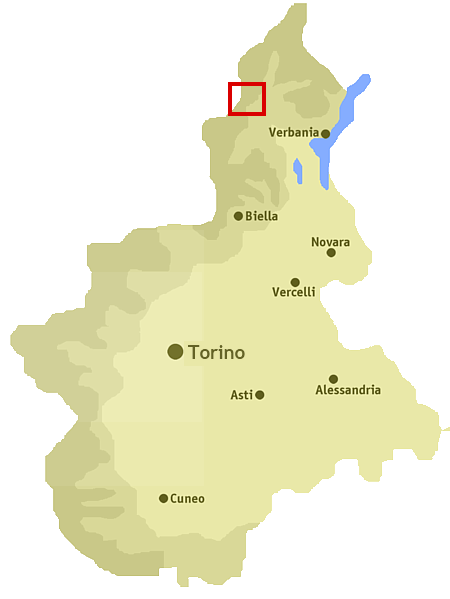
Valle Antrona in Piedmont

The Alta Valle Antrona Natural Park is a nature reserve in Piedmont, in Italy.

It is located in the Valle Antrona, in Ossola, between an altitude of 500 and 3.656 m (Pizzo d'Andolla). Despite the mining activities carried out in the past, the natural vegetation and fauna have been preserved.

A great portion of the park adjoins Switzerland. It is managed by the Alpe Veglia and Alpe Devero Natural Park.

== See also ==
- CoEur - In the heart of European paths
