= Bognanco =

Bognanco Bügnanch
- Comune
- Comune di Bognanco
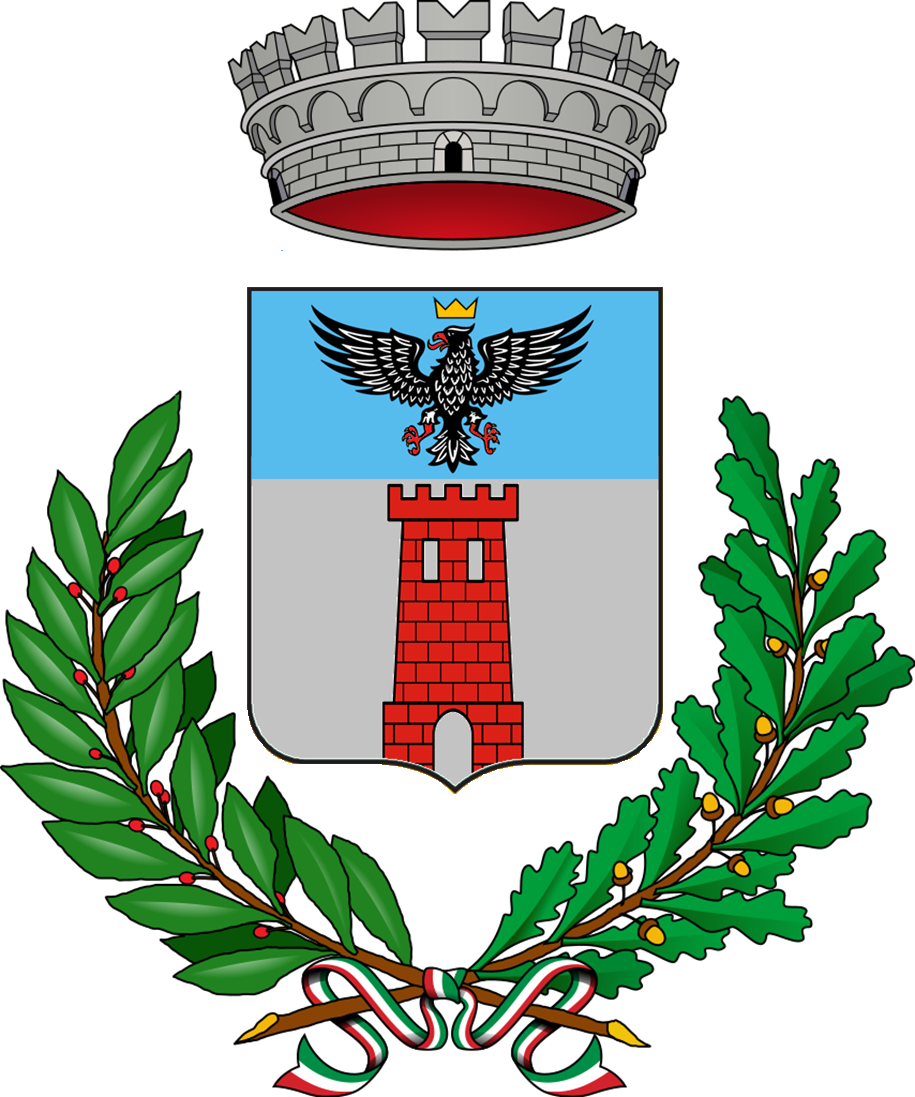
- Coat of arms

- Location within Italy Location within Piedmont
- Coordinates: 46°7′45″N 8°11′54″E
- Country: Italy
- Region: Piedmont
- Province: Verbano-Cusio-Ossola (VB)

Government
  - Mayor: Giuseppe Maccagno (lista civica), elected 7 June 2009.

Area
  - Total: 58.1 km^{2} (22.4 sq mi)
- Elevation: 980 m (3,220 ft)
- Highest elevation: 2,173 m (7,129 ft)
- Lowest elevation: 380 m (1,250 ft)

Population (1 January 2009)
  - Total: 258
  - Density: 4.44/km^{2} (11.5/sq mi)
- Demonym: Bognanchesi
- Time zone: UTC+1 (CET)
  - Summer (DST): UTC+2 (CEST)
- Postal code: 28042
- Dialing code: 0324
- Patron saint: Saint Lawrence
- Saint day: 10 August
- Website: www.comune.bognanco.vb.it

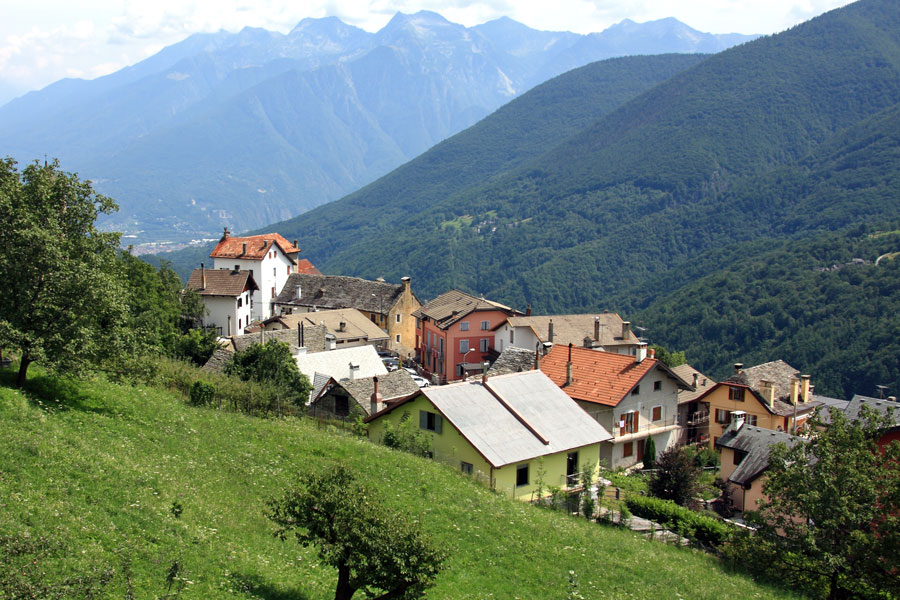
San Lorenzo in Bognanco

Bognanco (Western Lombard: Bügnanch), population about 250, is a commune in the Province of Verbano-Cusio-Ossola in the Italian region Piedmont, located in an Alpine valley, called Val Bognanco, about 120 kilometres (75 mi) northeast of Turin immediately to the west of Domodossola and on the border with Switzerland. Its municipal boundaries extend over an area of 58.1 square kilometres (22.4 mi^{2}) that ranges in elevation from 380 to 2,713 metres (1,247 to 8,901 ft) above sea-level and borders on the Italian communes of Antrona Schieranco, Crevoladossola, Domodossola, Montescheno and Trasquera, and Zwischbergen in the Swiss canton Valais.

The population is distributed between two main settlements, a number of hamlets, and various isolated dwellings: the seat of the municipality is in San Lorenzo (980 m). Fonti (669 m) was also classified as a centro abitato ("populated centre"). Less strongly defined settlements (nuclei abitati) were Graniga (1113 m), Messasca (525 m), and Pizzanco (1142 m). Localities whose population was subject to significant variation during the course of a year were Pioi (850 m), La Gomba (1251 m), and Vercengio (1299 m). Morasco (956 m) is described as a ‘special mountain nucleus’.
