= Stellihorn =

Mountain in Switzerland

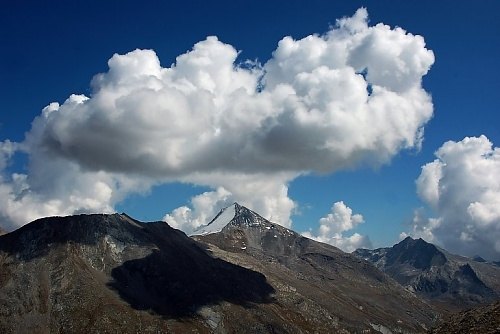
- The north side

Highest point
- Elevation: 3,436 m (11,273 ft)
- Prominence: 598 m (1,962 ft)
- Parent peak: Weissmies
- Isolation: 4.51 km (2.80 mi)
- Listing: Alpine mountains above 3000 m
- Coordinates: 46°2′11″N 8°0′8″E

Geography
- Location within Switzerland
- Location: Valais, Switzerland
- Parent range: Pennine Alps

The Stellihorn is a mountain of the Swiss Pennine Alps, overlooking the lake of Mattmark in the canton of Valais. It lies south of Saas-Almagell in the upper valley of Saas. The north side is covered by a glacier named Nollen Gletscher.
