= Val Bognanco =

Valley in Piedmont, Italy

Coordinates: 46°07′18″N 8°12′04″E

Val Bognanco (Bognanco Valley) is a valley of the Alps, situated in the Pennine range. The valley is drained by the Bogna, a tributary of the Toce at Domodossola that in turn drains into Lake Maggiore. The west side of the valley is mountain ridge that is attached to the main chain of Pennine Alps at Pizzo di Andolla and stretches from Northwest to Southeast. This ridge separates the Diveria river from Bogna.

Multiple mountains surrounding the valley are higher than 2,500 meters, and include Pizzo Straciugo (2,713 m, 8,901 ft), Cima del Rosso (2,609 m, 8,560 ft), Pizzo Pioltone (2,610 m, 8,560 ft), and Cima d'Azoglio (2,558 m, 8,392 ft).

The ridges around the valley contain multiple passes that used to be important to the economy of the valley in the past, including the Monscera Pass (2,103 m, 6,900 ft) and the Pontimia Pass (2,381 m, 7,812 ft) connecting to Simplon Valley.

The valley is known for the springs and spa center of Terme di Bognanco, located at Bognanco Fonti.

The valley is located in the Province of Verbano-Cusio-Ossola, in the Piedmont region of Italy. It belongs to a single municipality, Bognanco.

== Sources ==
- Bianchini, Mario (1952). "La val Bognanco appunti di geografia alpina". Bollettino della Società Geografica Italiana (in Italian): 118–135.
- D'Este, Berenice (2018-03-05). A come ACQUA. Idroterapia tra Occidente ed Oriente (in Italian). il Ciliegio Edizioni. ISBN 978-88-6771-476-6.
