= Antrona Schieranco =

- Comune
- Comune di Antrona Schieranco
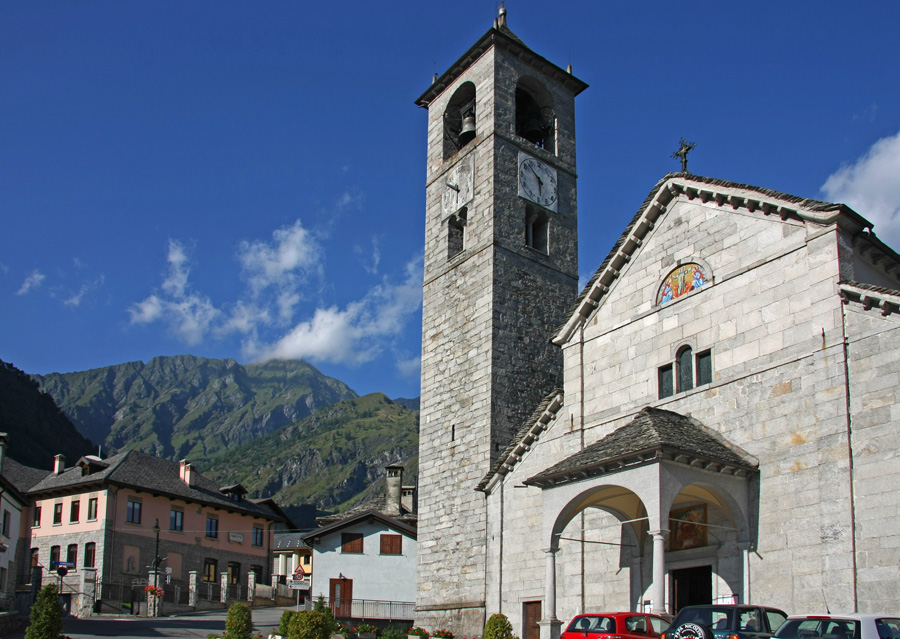
- Church of St. Lawrence (right) and the Town Hall (left)
- Interactive map of Antrona Schieranco
- Location of Antrona Schieranco in Italy Antrona Schieranco (Piedmont)
- Coordinates: 46°4′N 8°7′E
- Country: Italy
- Region: Piedmont
- Province: Verbano-Cusio-Ossola (VB)
- Frazioni: Cheggio, Locasca, Madonna, Rovesca

Government
  - Mayor: Claudio Simona

Area
  - Total: 100.7 km^{2} (38.9 sq mi)
- Elevation: 902 m (2,959 ft)

Population (Dec. 2004)
  - Total: 529
  - Density: 5.25/km^{2} (13.6/sq mi)
- Demonym: Antronesi
- Time zone: UTC+1 (CET)
  - Summer (DST): UTC+2 (CEST)
- Postal code: 28841
- Dialing code: 0324
- Website: Official website

Antrona Schieranco is a comune (municipality) in the Province of Verbano-Cusio-Ossola in the Italian region Piedmont, located about 120 kilometres (75 mi) northeast of Turin and about 35 kilometres (22 mi) northwest of Verbania, in the Valle Antrona, a branch of the Val d'Ossola, on the border with Switzerland.

Antrona Schieranco borders the following municipalities: Bognanco, Borgomezzavalle, Calasca-Castiglione, Ceppo Morelli, Montescheno, Saas Almagell (Switzerland), Vanzone con San Carlo, Zwischbergen (Switzerland). Until 1946, it was a center for silver and gold mining.

The Portjengrat (Italian: Pizzo d'Andolla) is located nearby.
