= Spechhorn =

Mountain in Switzerland

- Pizzo di Antigine
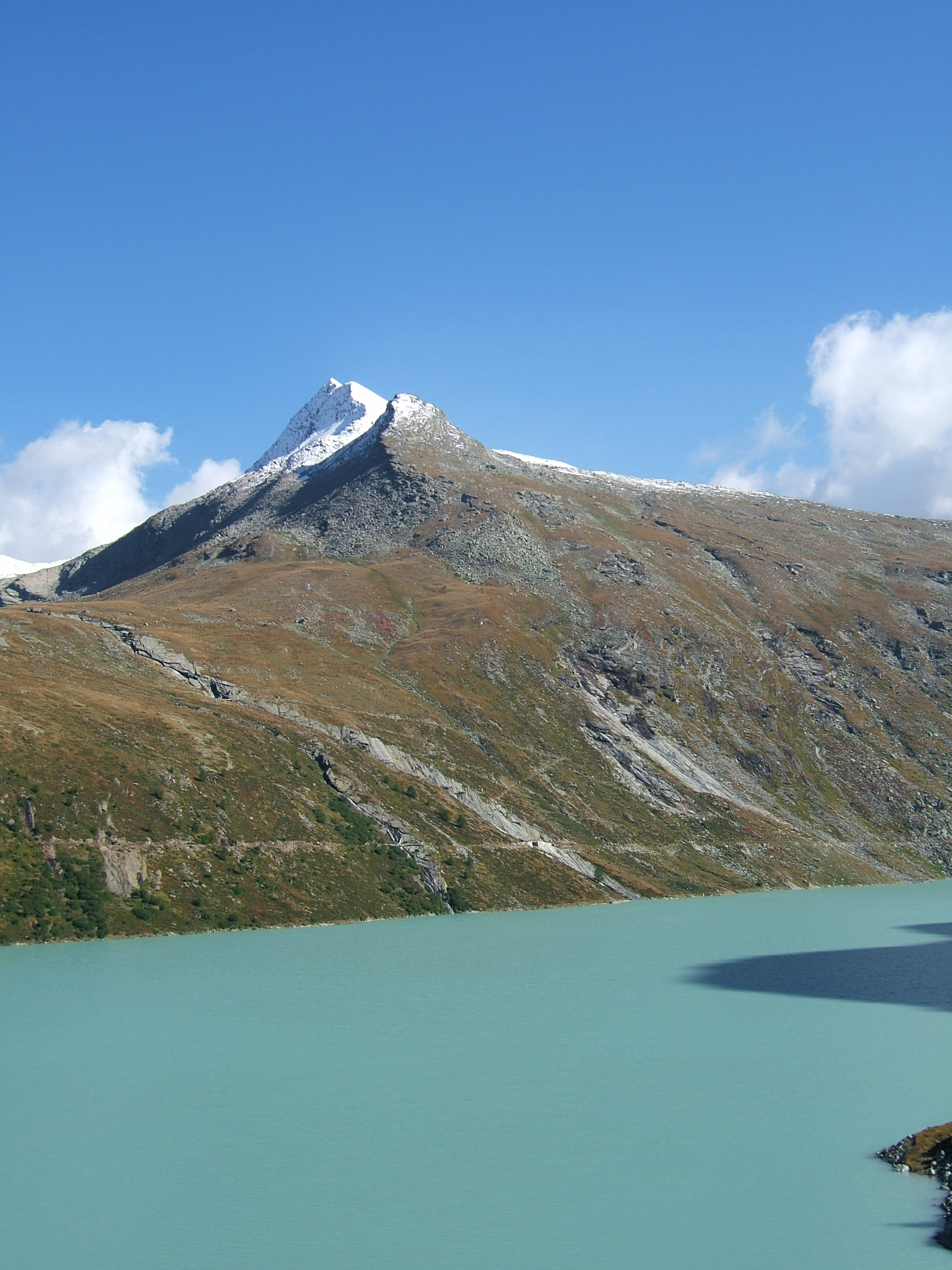
- Spechhorn from the Mattmarksee (north side)

Highest point
- Elevation: 3,189 m (10,463 ft)
- Prominence: 354 m (1,161 ft)
- Parent peak: Weissmies
- Isolation: 2.31 km (1.44 mi)
- Listing: Alpine mountains above 3000 m
- Coordinates: 46°0′44″N 8°0′4″E

Geography
- Location within Alps
- Location: Valais, Switzerland; Piedmont, Italy
- Parent range: Pennine Alps

The Spechhorn (it: Pizzo di Antigine) is a mountain of the Pennine Alps, located on the border between Italy and Switzerland. On its northern side (Valais) it overlooks the lake of Mattmark.
