= Crevoladossola =

- Comune
- Comune di Crevoladossola
- Coat of arms

- Location within Italy Location within Piedmont
- Coordinates: 46°10′N 8°18′E
- Country: Italy
- Region: Piedmont
- Province: Verbano-Cusio-Ossola (VB)
- Frazioni: Preglia, Caddo, Bosco, Barro

Government
  - Mayor: Gianni Rondinelli

Area
  - Total: 39.7 km^{2} (15.3 sq mi)
- Elevation: 375 m (1,230 ft)

Population (30 September 2008)
  - Total: 4,711
  - Density: 119/km^{2} (307/sq mi)
- Demonym: Crevolesi
- Time zone: UTC+1 (CET)
  - Summer (DST): UTC+2 (CEST)
- Postal code: 28035
- Dialing code: 0324
- Website: Official website

Crevoladossola is a comune (municipality) in the Province of Verbano-Cusio-Ossola in the Italian region Piedmont, located about 130 kilometres (81 mi) northeast of Turin and about 30 kilometres (19 mi) northwest of Verbania.

Crevoladossola borders the following municipalities: Bognanco, Crodo, Domodossola, Masera, Montecrestese, Trasquera, Varzo. In 1487, it was the location of the battle of Crevola between the Swiss Confederation and the Duchy of Milan.

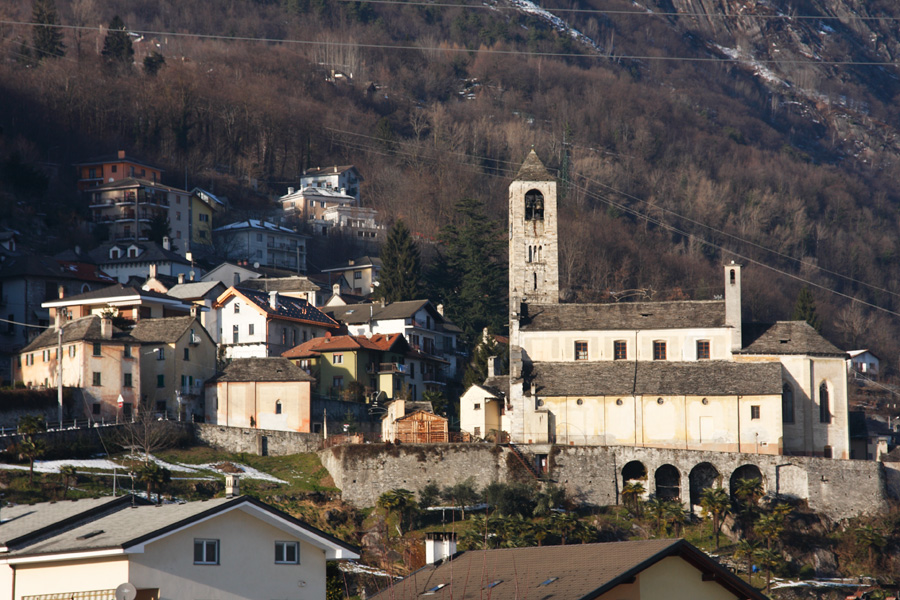
the town

The Crevoladossola Art Deco hydroelectric power plant was built by Ettore Conti in 1925, and designed by the architect Piero Portaluppi. It was renovated in 2011.
