= Sonnighorn =

Mountain in Switzerland

- Pizzo Bottarello
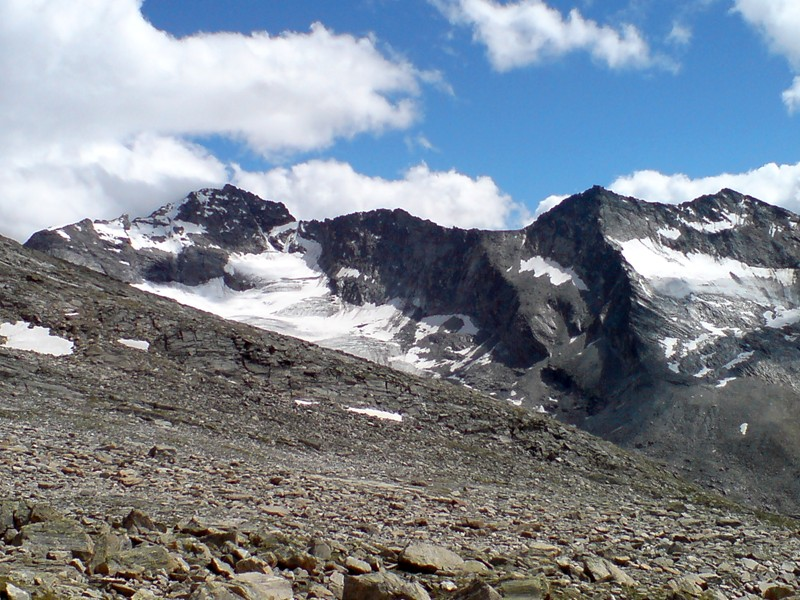
- Sonnighorn (left)

Highest point
- Elevation: 3,487 m (11,440 ft)
- Prominence: 340 m (1,120 ft)
- Parent peak: Weissmies
- Isolation: 3.1 km (1.9 mi)
- Listing: Alpine mountains above 3000 m
- Coordinates: 46°4′27.3″N 8°1′20.3″E

Geography
- Location within Alps
- Location: Valais, Switzerland/Piedmont, Italy
- Parent range: Pennine Alps

The Sonnighorn (it Pizzo Bottarello) is a mountain of the Pennine Alps, located on the Swiss-Italian border. The closest locality is Saas Almagell on the west side.
