= Portjengrat =

Mountain in Switzerland

- Pizzo d'Andolla
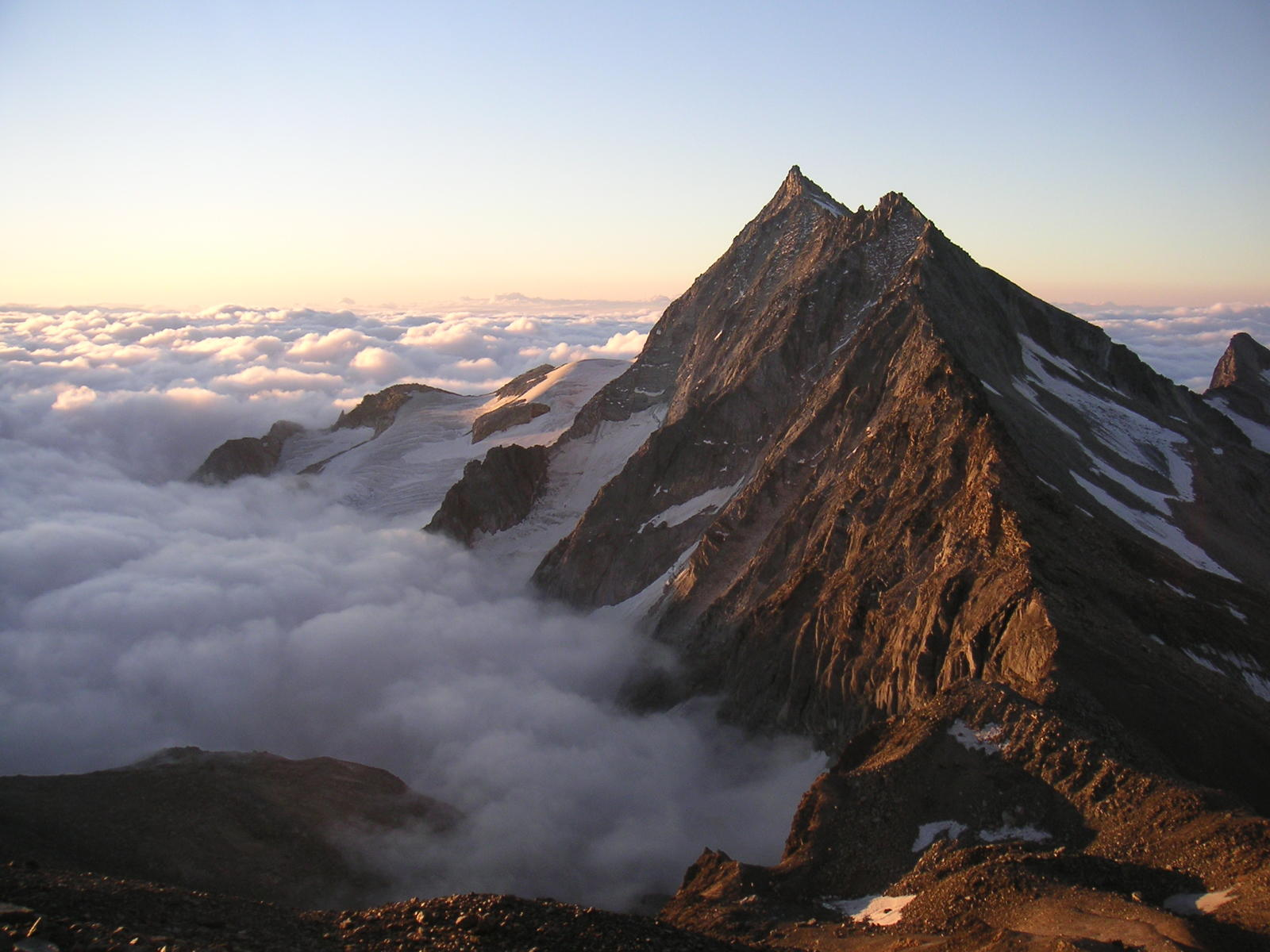
- View from the south ridge of the Weissmies

Highest point
- Elevation: 3,654 m (11,988 ft)
- Prominence: 411 m (1,348 ft)
- Parent peak: Weissmies
- Isolation: 3.47 km (2.16 mi)
- Listing: Alpine mountains above 3000 m
- Coordinates: 46°06′03.4″N 8°02′05″E

Geography
- Location within Alps
- Location: Valais, Switzerland; Piedmont, Italy
- Parent range: Pennine Alps

Climbing
- First ascent: 7 September 1871 by Franz and Alexander Burgener guiding Clinton Thomas Dent

The Portjengrat (also known as Pizzo d'Andolla) is a mountain of the Pennine Alps, located on the border between Switzerland and Italy. It lies south of the Weissmies and the Zwischbergen Pass, where the international border diverges away from the main Alpine watershed. The summit of the Portjengrat has an elevation of 3,654 metres above sea level and is the tripoint between the valleys of Saas, Divedro (both in Valais) and Antrona (in Piedmont). It is the culminating point of the Antrona valley.

The east side of the Portjengrat is covered by a glacier named Zwischbergen Gletscher. Smaller glaciers can be found on the west and south side of the mountain.

The closest locality is Saas-Almagell, on the west side.

== Huts ==
- Andolla Hut - 2,061m C.A.I. Villadossola, 76 places (17 winter room), open from june to october.
- Almageller hutte - 2,894m, SAC Niesen. 20 places (13 winter room), open from june to september.
- Bivouac Città di Varese - 2650m, C.A.I. Varese, 9 places, situated at the foot of the south wall.

== See also ==
- List of mountains of Switzerland
