= Montorfano (mountain) =

Isolated granite mountain in Mergozzo, Italy

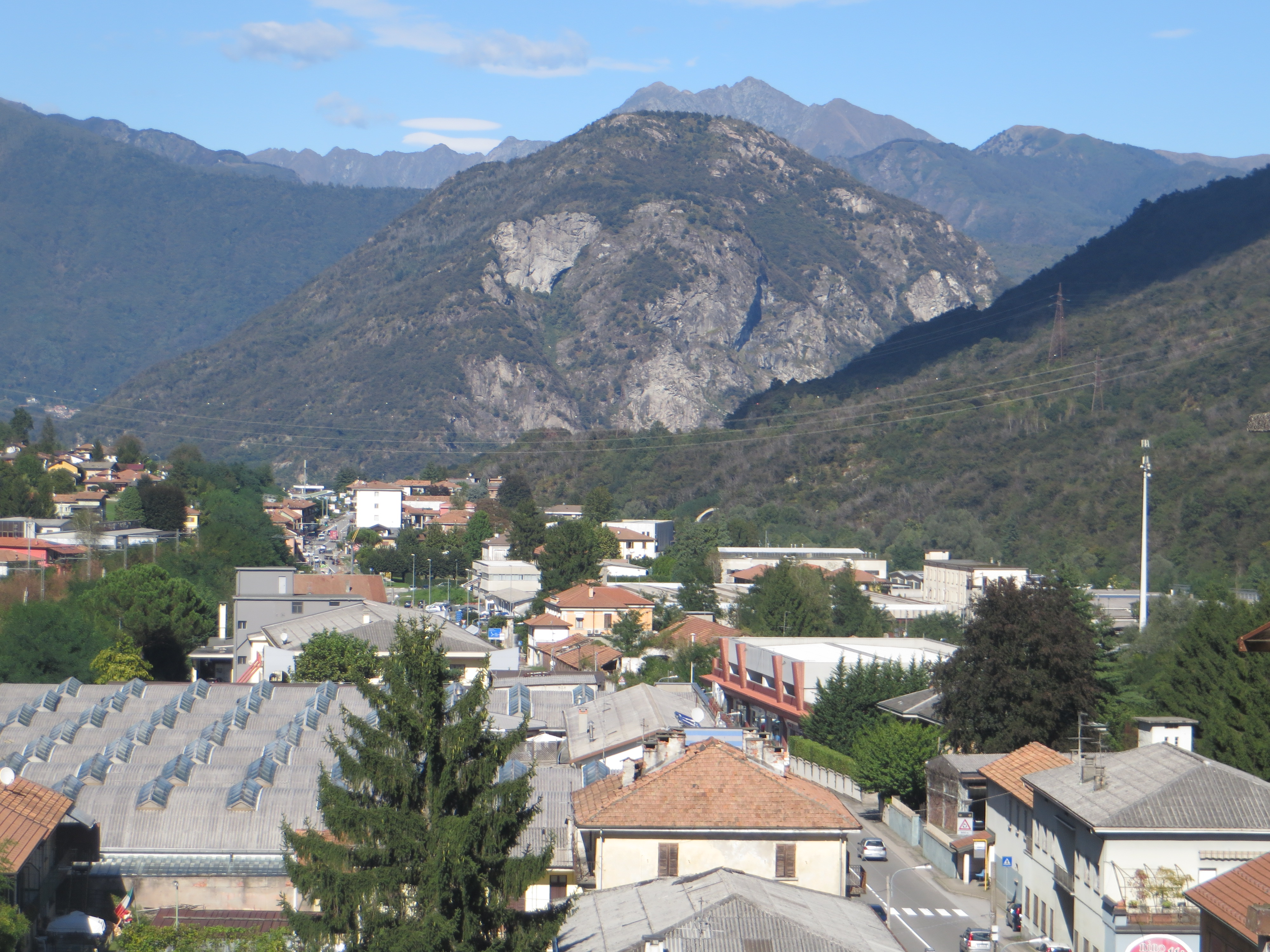
- Montorfano seen from Sant'Anna in Casale Corte Cerro

Highest point
- Prominence: 590 m (1,940 ft)
- Isolation: 3.13 km (1.94 mi)
- Coordinates: 45.943317°N 8.455617°E

Geography
- Country: Italy
- Region: Piedmont
- Parent range: Alps

The Montorfano (794 meters above sea level), also known as Mont'Orfano, is an isolated ridge located in the municipality of Mergozzo, in the Province of Verbano-Cusio-Ossola, belonging to the Lepontine Alps (which extend to the north and east), not far from the Pennine Alps (located to the south and west).

== Characteristics ==
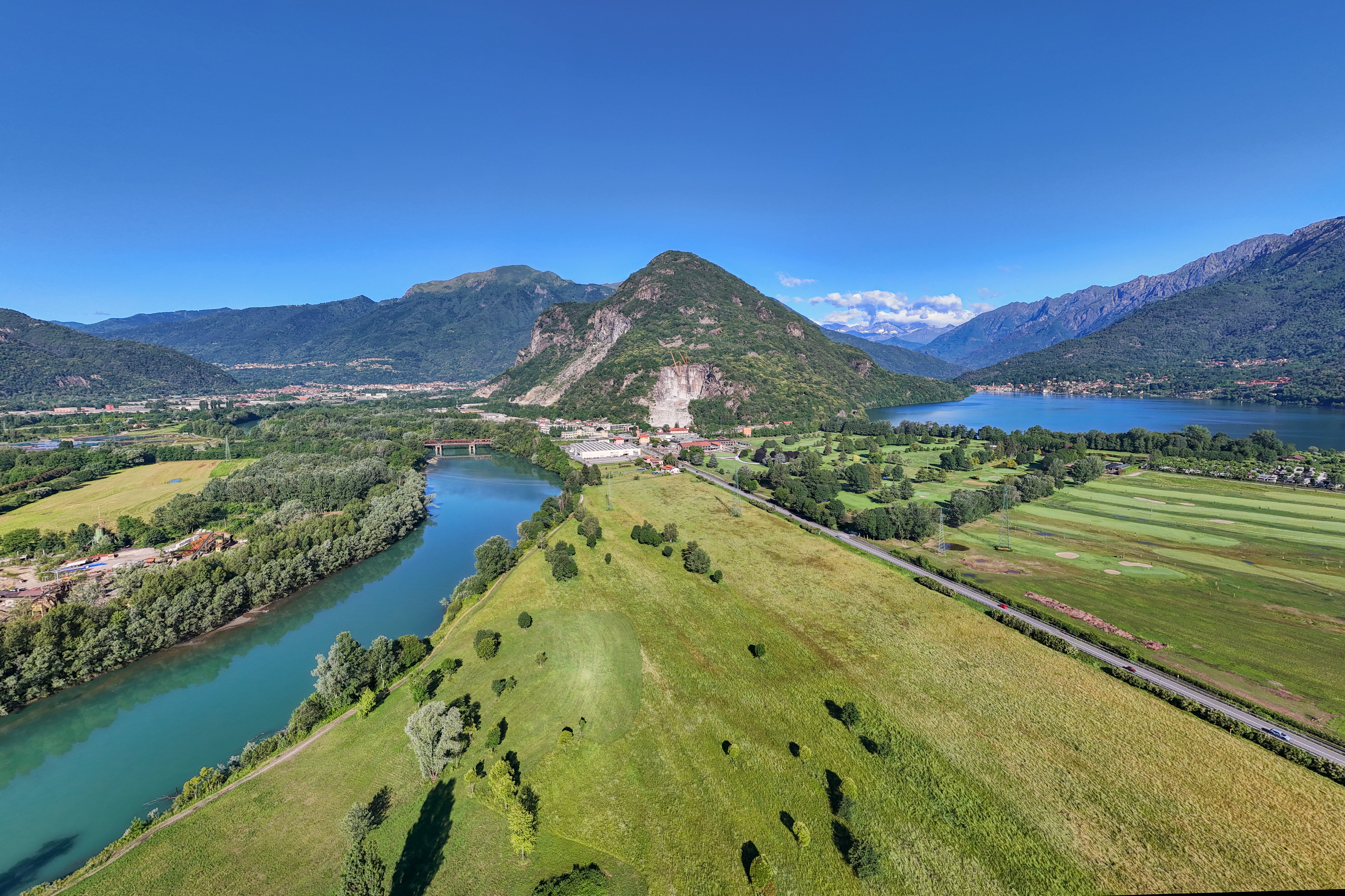
The Toce skirts Lago di Mergozzo on its way to Lago Maggiore. Montorfano is the mountain between the Toce and Lago di Mergozzo.

Montorfano forms a watershed between Verbano, Cusio, and the Ossola. It also marks the divide between Val Corcera and the Val Grande. Geologically, it is considered to have once belonged to the same system as Mottarone, within the area known as the Mergozzolo.

Its most distinctive feature is its isolated position—reflected in its name—within a large bend of the Toce River, at the entrance to the alluvial plain that nearly encircles it. Only its northeastern slope descends directly into Lake Mergozzo. Although surrounded by higher peaks, the summit provides an extensive panorama over the mouth of the Toce and the Borromean Gulf.

=== Geology and quarrying activity ===
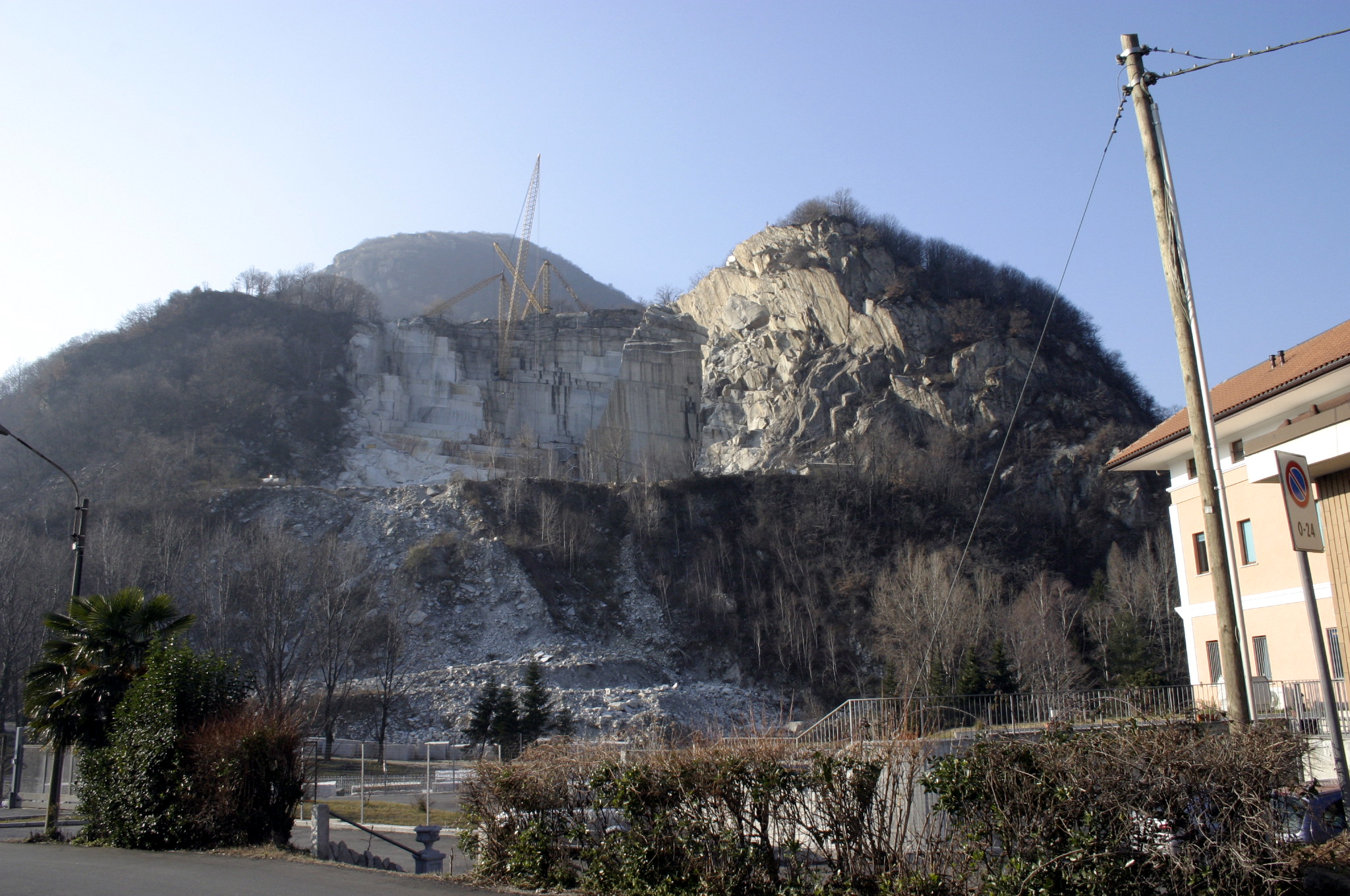
An image of the quarries

Geologically, it is formed by a massive monolith of white and light gray granite with a small area, on the western slope, of green granite; together with other granite varieties in the area, such as that of Baveno, Alzo white granite, Roccapietra, and Quarna, it is part of the Graniti dei Laghi, formed by outcrops of plutonic magmatic rock. Historically, it is referred to as Granito di Montorfano.

These outcrops were eroded by the Ossola Pleistocene glacier, which completely covered Montorfano, smoothing its rocks and leaving the summit rounded and still devoid of vegetation.

Quarrying activity dates back at least to the time of Gian Galeazzo Visconti, who on 24 October 1387 wrote to the Deputies of the Veneranda Fabbrica del Duomo of Milan that for the sake of the Fabbrica of the main church of our city of Milan, the stones mentioned in the above-referenced petition may be quarried on the lands of those where said stones are found. On August 21, 1473, Galeazzo Maria Sforza renewed the quarrying privilege, prohibiting the sale and commercial use of the stones. The first record of column supply dates to 1506, when 12 granite columns were provided to the Lazzaretto of Milan; at the time, the term used to define the stone was "migliarolo" due to its granular appearance.

In the early 1900s, over thirty quarries were active; traces of this activity are still visible today, with hiking trails passing by disused quarries, lizza roads, and material dumps. A disused quarry, the "Cuzzi Peretti quarry under the marsh", has been restored for museum purposes and is part of the Ecomuseo del Granito. The use of the stone is evident in numerous artifacts, from dry stone walls to the construction of steps and stone slab fences. The most notable building on Montorfano is the San Giovanni Battista Church, dating back to the 12th century but built on the site of an older church.

During the First World War, Montorfano was part of the Frontier North, the Linea Cadorna in the Toce-Verbano sector; near the summit, barracks and the powder magazine building are still present.

Montorfano was included as a potential World Heritage Site in the nomination Paesaggi lacustri del Lago Maggiore e del Lago d'Orta in 2006.

== Protected area ==
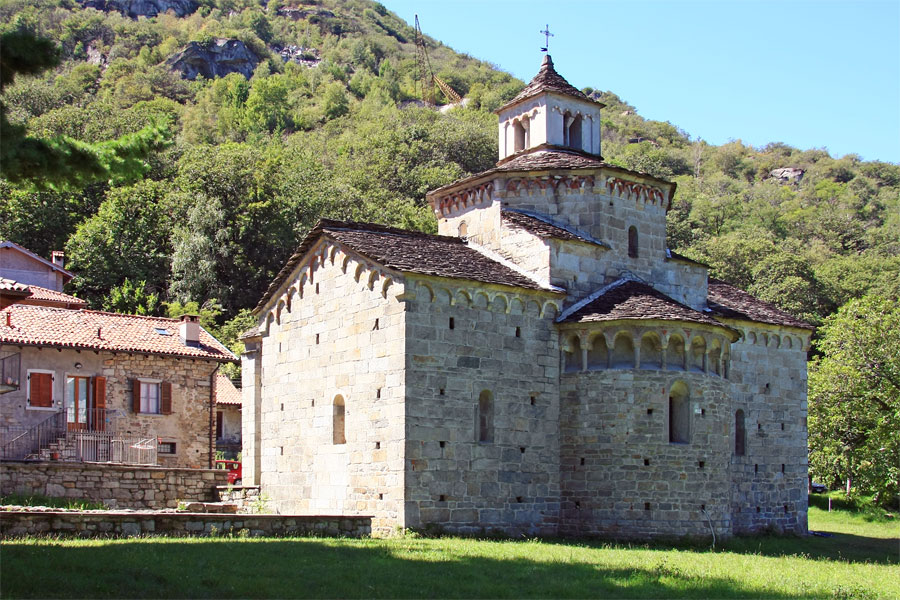
The San Giovanni Battista Church

Montorfano is included in the Special Protection Area "Lago di Mergozzo e Mont'Orfano" which is part of the Natura 2000 network. In particular, the slopes of the ridge are a nesting area for some raptor species such as the kestrel, the peregrine falcon, and the Eurasian eagle-owl, as well as other species like the common raven, the wallcreeper, and the blue rock thrush.

The forests are predominantly composed of chestnut trees and provide habitat for some species of conservation value, such as the tree sparrow, considered vulnerable, and the western Bonelli’s warbler, which is considered to have an unfavorable conservation status.

== Ascent to the summit ==
The summit can be reached starting from Gravellona Toce, Verbania, and Mergozzo

== Bibliography ==
- Bagnati, Tullio; Martini, Giancarlo (2008). Andar per monti e panorami del Lago Maggiore [Exploring the Mountains and Panoramas of Lake Maggiore] (in Italian). Gravellona Toce: Tararà. ISBN 9788886593571.
