= Pizzo Moro =

Mountain in Italy

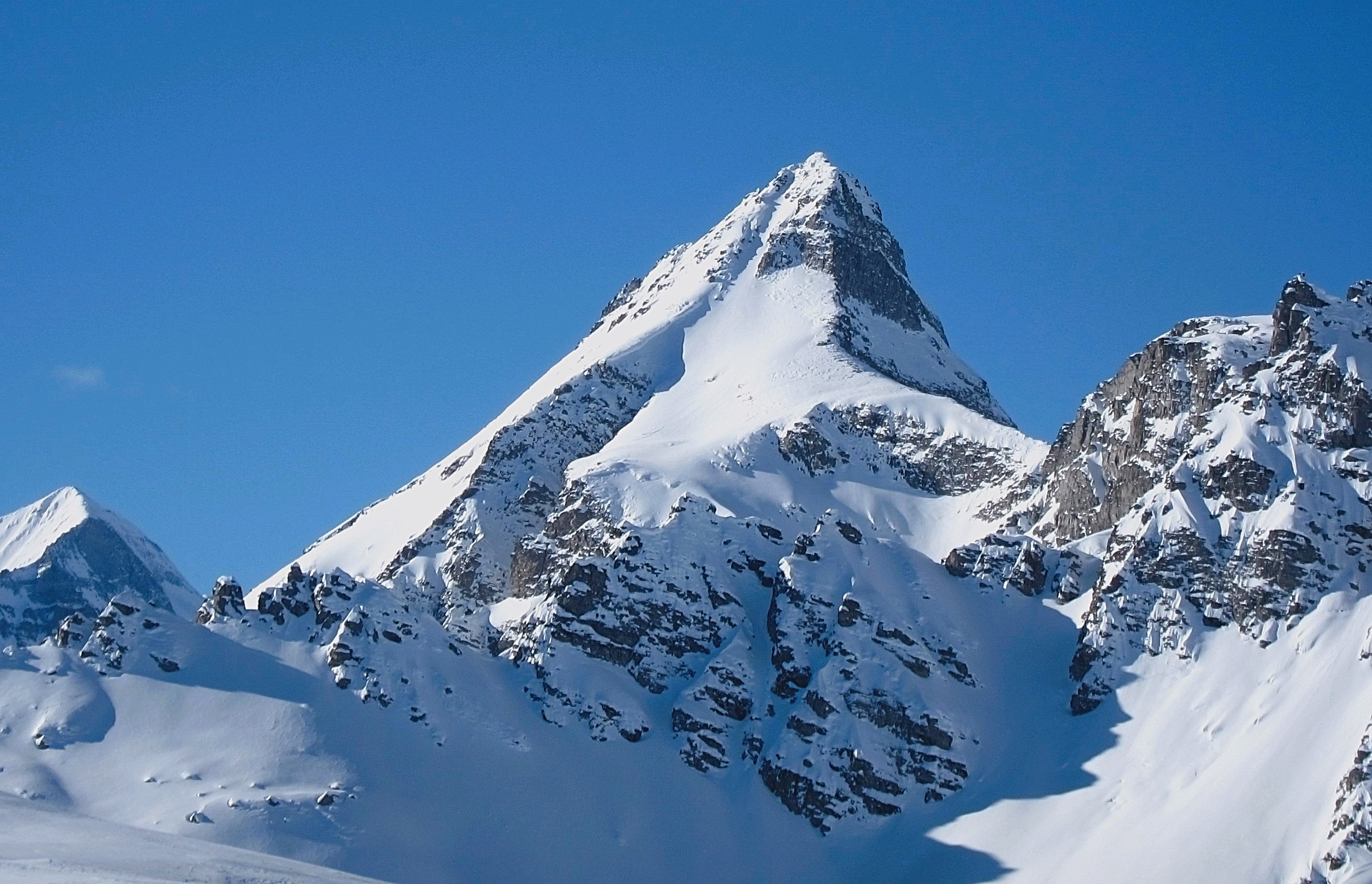
- East aspect

Highest point
- Elevation: 2,948 m (9,672 ft)
- Prominence: 264 m (866 ft)
- Parent peak: Helsenhorn
- Isolation: 1.6 km (0.99 mi)
- Coordinates: 46°17′04″N 8°11′41″E

Geography
- Location within Italy
- Country: Italy
- Province: Verbano-Cusio-Ossola
- Protected area: Alpe Veglia and Alpe Devero Natural Park
- Parent range: Alps; Lepontine Alps
- Topo map(s): Tabacco 11 Valle Divedro, Valle Cairasca, and Alpe Veglia-Devero

Climbing
- First ascent: July 23, 1892

Pizzo Moro is a mountain in the province of Verbano-Cusio-Ossola in northern Italy.

== Description ==
Pizzo Moro is a 2,948-meter-elevation (9,672-foot) summit in the Lepontine Alps which are a subrange of the Alps. Set in the Piedmont region and Alpe Veglia and Alpe Devero Natural Park, the mountain is located 19 kilometers (11.8 miles) north-northwest of the city of Domodossola. Precipitation runoff from the mountain's slopes drains west into tributaries of the Diveria and east into tributaries of the Toce. Topographic relief is significant as the summit rises 850 meters (2,788 feet) above the Bondolero Valley in approximately 1.25 kilometers (0.77 mile). The nearest higher mountain is Pizzo di Boccareccio, 1.6 kilometers (1 mile) to the north-northeast. The first known ascent of Pizzo Moro was accomplished on July 23, 1892, by Cesare Conterio, Alessandro Cotta, Carlo Cressini, Lorenzo Marani, Riccardo Gerla, Democrito Prina, and Vittorio Roggia via the south slope.

== Climate ==
Based on the Köppen climate classification, Pizzo Moro is located in an alpine climate zone with long, cold winters, and short, mild summers. Weather systems are forced upwards by the mountains (orographic lift), causing moisture to drop in the form of rain and snow. The months of July and August offer the most favorable weather for visiting or climbing this mountain.

== See also ==
- Geography of the Alps
