= Ossola Partisan Republic =

Former partisan republic in Italy

Free Republic of Ossola Libera Repubblica dell'Ossola (Italian)
- September 9, 1944–October 23, 1944
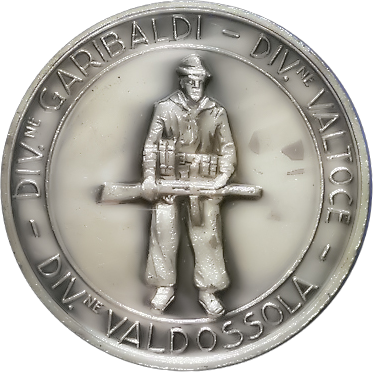
- Flag Coat of arms

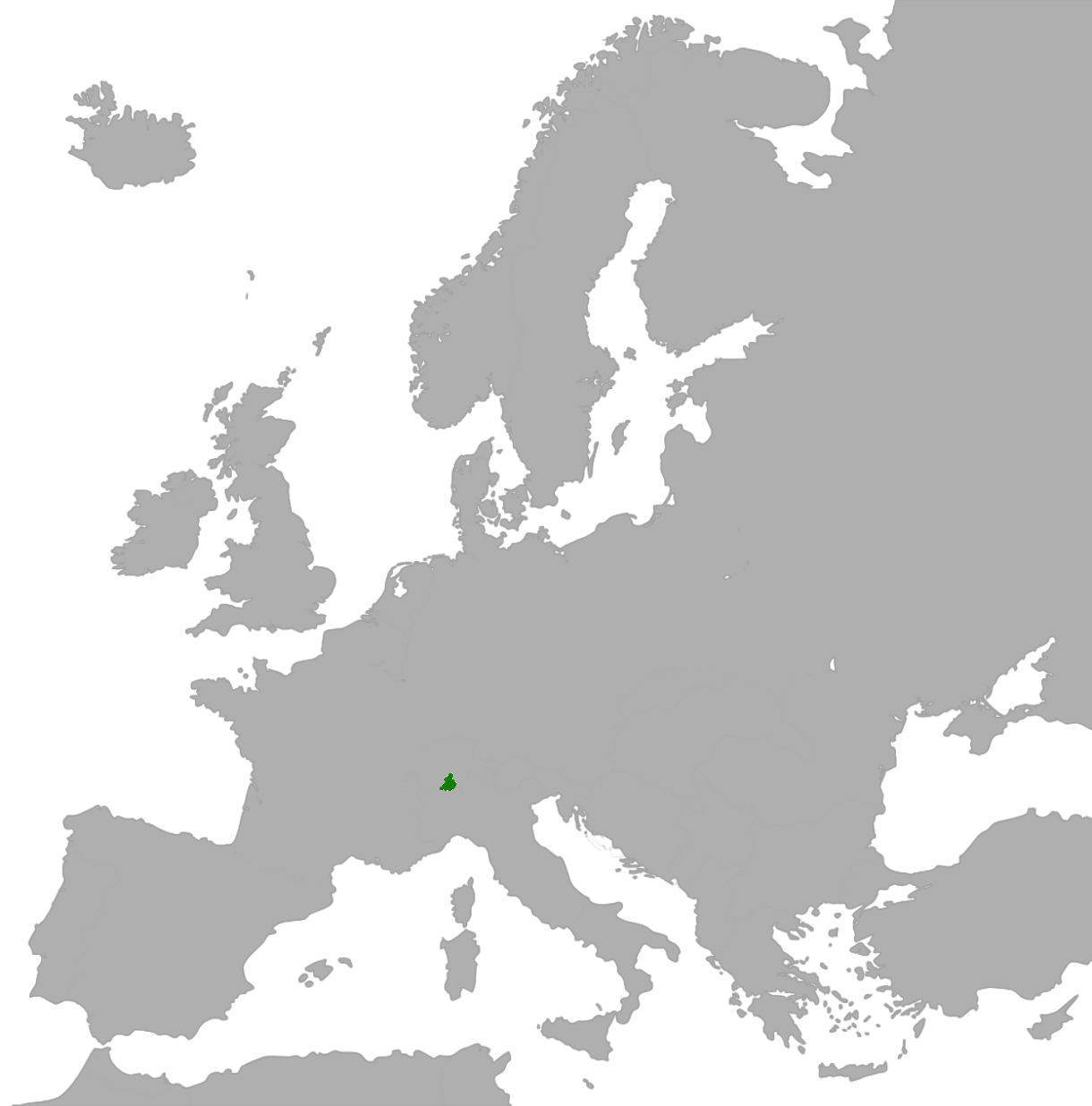
- Ossola Republic in Europe

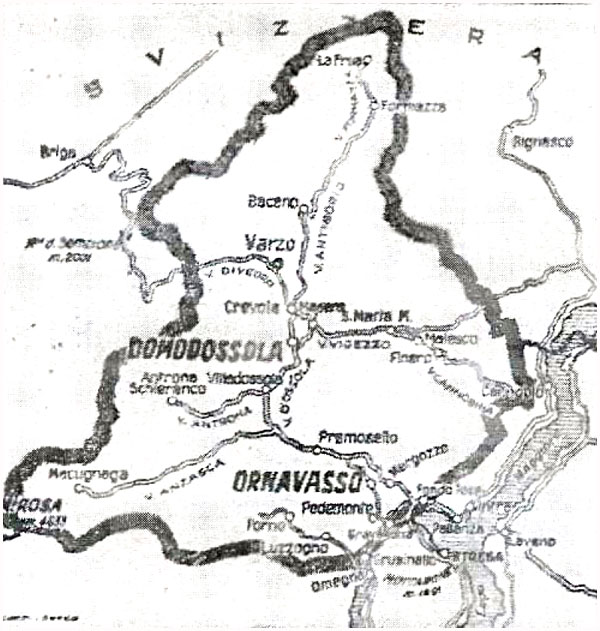
- Boundaries of the Ossola Republic
- Capital: Domodossola
- Government: Partisan republic
- History
  - Established: September 9, 1944
  - Disestablished: October 23, 1944
Preceded by	Succeeded by
Italian Social Republic	Italian Social Republic
- Today part of: Italy

The Ossola Republic was a partisan republic that was established in northern Italy on September 10, 1944 and recaptured by the fascists on October 23, 1944. Unlike other partisan republics, the Ossola Republic was able, in little more than a month of existence, to cope not only with the contingencies imposed by the state of war, but also to give itself an articulate organization, with the establishment of the Provisional Government Council of Domodossola and the liberated zone (G.P.G.). During its brief Forty Days of Freedom, illustrious figures such as Umberto Terracini, Piero Malvestiti and Gianfranco Contini collaborated on the drafting of democratically oriented reforms, which would later inspire the drafting of the Italian Constitution.

The history of the Ossola Republic was told in Leandro Castellani's screenplay Forty Days of Freedom and Giorgio Bocca's book A Partisan Republic (1964). A very detailed narrative is also found in Eugenio Corti's novel The Red Horse.

== Historical and political value ==
In the course of the Resistance, there were many areas liberated from the Nazi-Fascists, which organized themselves into Partisan Republics (among the first were the Republic of Maschito, the Republic of Corniolo and the Republic of Montefiorino). According to Roberto Battaglia, however, the largest and most significant were the Ossola Republic and the Carnia Republic. Giorgio Bocca, to these two major republics, also adds the Republic of Alto Monferrato.

In the assessment of most scholars, the Ossola experience occupies a prominent place for multiple reasons. First and foremost because of the vastness of the territory over which the government was able to extend: the territory conquered by the partisans included an area of 1600 km², six valleys, 32 municipalities and more than 80000 inhabitants. Moreover, while there is no doubt that the various Ossola partisan formations, through multiple valiant military actions, were the architects of the birth of the Ossola Republic, this event cannot be confined to a mere fact of arms. Aldo Moro wrote on the occasion of the 15th anniversary:

The Ossola Republic had an unquestionable political value in that it revealed the spontaneous charge of the civil values of the Resistance Movement, which did not exhaust its commitment to the struggle for the liberation of the homeland from the foreigners, but expressed the aspiration for a new order of Society, according to the natural popular vocations for democracy, which the fascist dictatorship had failed to destroy.

— Aldo Moro, Letter on the occasion of the 15th anniversary of the Ossola Republic

The political and administrative experience operated with an broad perspective, aiming to be a new type of national community and state. The Provisional Council was successful in organizing the essential supplies for the population, assistance, military defense, police, order of employment, finances, schooling, welfare, and justice. While in its brief existence, the G.P.G. had no way, except for the school program, to draw up programmatic documents or Charters of Principles (similar to attempts at constitutional charters) from reading the minutes and documents occasionally issued by the Council. From this, one can discern the principles of true legality and freedom by which the future Italian Republic would be inspired and on which it would settle. There are examples of this in many spheres:

The Ossola episode is also of great value because it anticipated and intuited in their administrative and educational significance the importance of local autonomist structures, which would be more widely accepted in the Italian Constitution and form one of the most valuable components of our political and administrative system. (...) In this sense, in my opinion, this splendid page of our history should be judged: that is, as a testimony and as a symbol of the moral charge that animated the Italian Resistance in its most shining and genuine expressions

— Aldo Moro, Letter on the occasion of the 15th anniversary of the Ossola Republic

No different, no less glorious and bloody was the story of many other valleys and areas of occupied Italy. What sets the Ossola Republic apart from them and gives it a special prominence and place in the history of Liberation? It is precisely the formal proclamation, in this liberated corner of Italy, of a Republic and the establishment of a republican government. An act of audacity, almost of defiance to the future: an affirmation of a destiny now inescapable

— Ferruccio Parri, Letter on the occasion of the 15th anniversary of the Ossola Republic

== History ==
=== Partisan formations in the Ossola Valley in the summer of 1944 ===
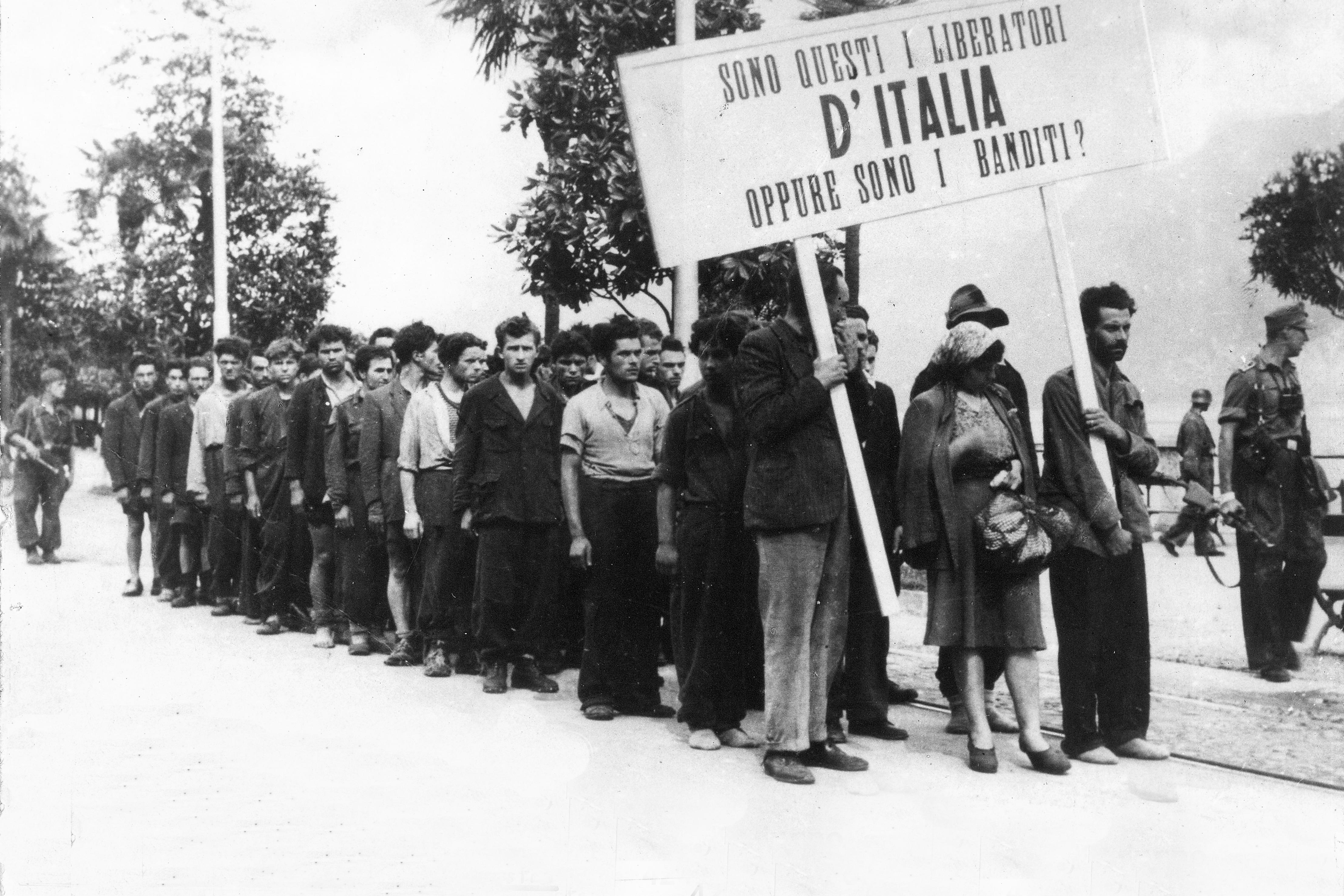
Captured partisans are paraded along Verbania's lakefront before being shot, June 20, 1944.

Numerous partisan formations were active in the mountainous areas west of Lake Maggiore. In Valsesia, some partisan groups had established the Valsesia Partisan Republic as early as June. Among the groups active in Val d'Ossola were Dionigi Superti's Valdossola, Armando Calzavara's Cesare Battisti (Arca), Nino Chiovini's Giovane Italia (Peppo) and Guido il Monco, and Mario Flaim's 10th Garibaldi Brigade.

From June 11 to July 1, 1944, the SS command in Monza coordinated a military operation aimed at annihilating partisan formations established particularly in the Val Grande wilderness: for some 20 days several thousand Nazi-Fascists hunted down 500 partisans. Despite the presence, among the partisans, of nurse Maria Peron who saved many lives, at the end of the roundup there were about 300 dead partisans, 208 huts and stables burned in Val Grande and Val Pogallo, 50 houses damaged or destroyed by shelling in Cicogna. There were numerous shootings of captured partisans in those days, the most substantial on June 20 with 42 victims in Fondotoce, at the site where the Memorial and Peace Park was later erected. After the action ended, commander Mario Muneghina formed the Garibaldian brigade Valgrande Martire. Victims of the roundup were also civilians, shepherds and herdsmen, who paid with their lives or with the burning of their stables for their support given to the Resistance.

=== Liberation ===
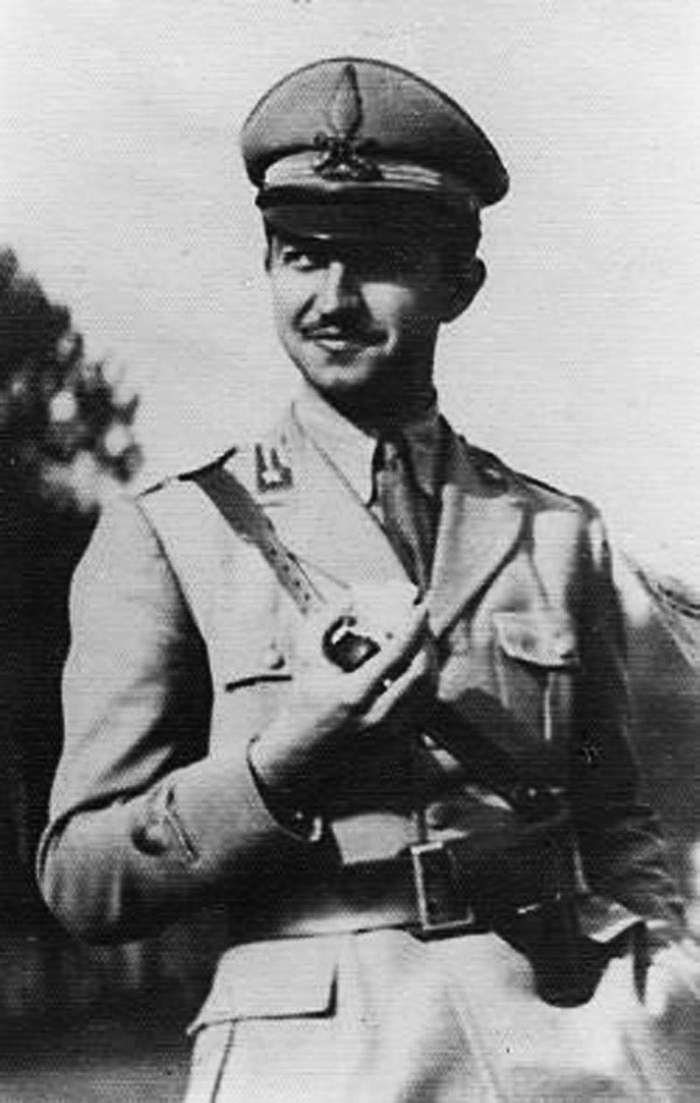
Alfredo Di Dio

The liberation of the region was due to the partisans of the Val Toce Division, who, under the command of Captain Alfredo Di Dio, attacked the fascist troops stationed in Domodossola on September 8, 1944, defeating them and, after driving them out, called the area "liberated territory." Only later, following the example of areas such as the Corniolo Republic, the first partisan republic in northern Italy, did the expression "republic" of Ossola begin to be used. All Fascist laws and military bodies were dissolved in just 2 days. The export of currency was banned and the toponymy of the valley was renewed. Salò reacted by cutting off supplies to the entire valley, but, after some uncertainty, the small republic obtained the support of Switzerland.

=== Fall ===
On October 10, Social Republic troops attacked with 5,000 men and, after bitter fighting, recaptured the entire territory on October 23. Most of the population abandoned the Ossola Valley to take refuge in Switzerland, leaving the territory almost deserted, effectively preventing the strong reprisals that were threatened by the fascists and the head of the province in particular. In this regard, the very head of the province Enrico Vezzalini wrote the famous communiqué to Mussolini that read, "We have reconquered the Ossola, we must reconquer the Ossolans."

== Provisional Government Council ==
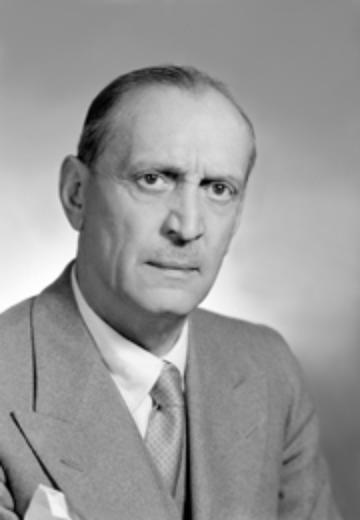
Ettore Tibaldi, President of the Provisional Council.

Even if it lasted only one week, we must act and think as in yesterday's Italy was not acted and thought, we must behave like the men of the Roman Republic of 1849

— Ettore Tibaldi, First meeting of the G.P.G.

The Provisional Government Council took office on September 11, 1944 at the Civic Palace in the city of Domodossola, by order of Major Dionigi Superti, commander of the Val d'Ossola Division and representative of the other Patriot formations of the Ossola Valley. It had jurisdiction over all the liberated territories of the Ossola and Cannobina Valleys with a catchment area of more than 80,000 inhabitants. The boundaries of the Republic started from Lake Maggiore including, at its limits, Cannero, Oggebbio, Trarego, Ghiffa, Premeno, Aurano, Intragna, Caprezzo, Cambiasca, Miazzina, Cossogno, San Bernardino Verbano, Mergozzo and Ornavasso (Cannobio was excluded).

=== Members of the Council ===
The G.P.G. met twelve times in the Historic Hall of the Domodossola City Hall and once in the Antigorio Valley (when Domodossola had already been evacuated) and was composed as follows:

- Prof. Ettore Tibaldi (socialist): Presidency-Commissioner for liaison with the National Liberation Committee, for Foreign Relations, Justice and Hygiene
- Eng. Giorgio Ballarini (independent anti-fascist): Commissioner for Public Services, Transportation, Labor.
- Dr. Mario Bandini (Bonfantini on registry, socialist): Commissioner for liaison with the Military Authority, Press

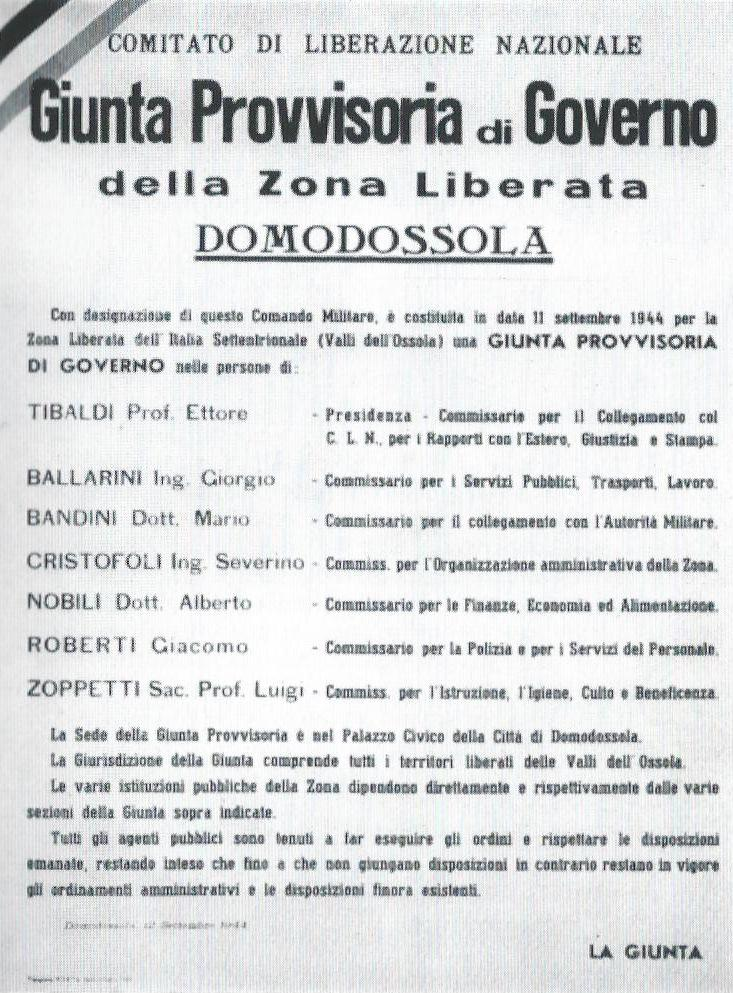
The Manifesto announcing the formation of the Provisional Government Council

- Eng. Severino Cristofoli (Action Party): Commissioner for the Administrative Organization of the Zone and for the Control of Industrial Production.
- Dr. Alberto Nobili (Liberal): Commissioner for Finance, Economy and Food
- Giacomo Roberti (Communist): Commissioner for Police and Personnel Services
- Prof., priest Luigi Zoppetti: Commissioner for Education, Worship and Public Assistance

They were successively succeeded by:

- Don Gaudenzio Cabalà (Christian Democrat): Commissioner for Education, Worship and Public Assistance (replacing Luigi Zoppetti since September 16)
- Oreste Filopanti (born Emilio Colombo, Communist): Commissioner of Police and Personnel Services (replacing Giacomo Roberti since September 22)
- Luigi Mari (born Natale Menotti, Christian Democrat): Commissioner for Tax and Financial Affairs
- Amelia Valli (born Gisella Floreanini in Della Porta, Communist): Commissioner for Assistance and Relations with Popular Organizations (installed Oct. 7).

The president of the council, Ettore Tibaldi, was a physician, a professor of medical pathology at the University of Pavia, who, because of his socialist ideas, had lost his university professorship and had self-confined in Domodossola. On Nov. 7, 1943, he had organized a workers' insurrection in Villadossola, which was bloodily repressed by the Nazi-Fascists. He had fled to Switzerland and then returned to the Ossola capital after the surrender of the German command on the evening of Sept. 9, 1944. After the Liberation, he would become Vice President of the Senate in the Fourth Legislature.

Gisella Floreanini was the first woman to hold a government position in Italy: the first female minister of the Italian Republic would later be Tina Anselmi in the Third Andreotti government.

Comrade Filopanti, commissioner for Justice, presenting her as a "ministerial candidate" emphasized the value of the new fact of an Italian woman, to a position of governmental responsibility. The next day, Umberto Terracini, in Liberazione, newspaper of the Provisional Junta, commented on the democratic achievement that took place simply, without discussion. So many revolutionary, renewing facts of Italian political and social mores seemed to happen with simplicity then.

— Gisella Floreanini, A woman in Ossola's government

=== Members of the Zone National Liberation Committee ===
The Zone National Liberation Committee stood alongside the Council, with the task of political and administrative control. It turned out to be composed of:

- Tito Chiovenda (liberal), lawyer, diplomat and brother of jurist Giuseppe
- Ugo Claudio (Porzio-Giovanola, socialist)
- Gianfranco Contini (Action Party), celebrated historian, philologist and literary critic, gold medalist for meritorious contributions to the school of culture and art
- Giuseppe Marchioni (communist)
- Luigi Zoppetti (Christian Democrat)
- Ermenegildo Sacco (socialist), representative of the Novara CLN

=== Distinguished contributors ===
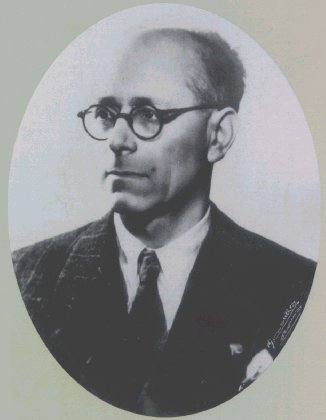
Umberto Terracini, general secretary and future president of the Constituent Assembly.

The Council, during its tenure, secured the help of various collaborators and advisers, some of whom would become prominent men of the early republic, also remembered in history for participating in the drafting of the Italian Constitution. Among them were:

- Umberto Terracini, as Secretary General, future president of the Constituent Assembly.
- Ezio Vigorelli, as Legal Counsel and Extraordinary Judge, also future member of the Constituent Assembly, Undersecretary of the Treasury in the Fifth De Gasperi Government (I legislature) and Minister of Labor and Social Policies in the Segni I Government, Scelba Government (II legislature) and Fanfani II Government (III legislature)
- Gigino Battisti, as Intendant and Commercial Agent, future Mayor of Trento and member of the Constituent Assembly
- Piero Malvestiti, as Financial Adviser, future Undersecretary to the Ministry of Finance in the De Gasperi IV Government, Undersecretary to the Ministry of Treasury in the De Gasperi V and De Gasperi VI Governments, Minister of Transport in the De Gasperi VII Government, Minister of Industry and Trade in the Pella Government, European Commissioner for the Internal Market, Vice-President of the European Economic Community, President of the ECSC
- Corrado Bonfantini, as representative of the CLNAI mission in Domodossola and later of the Provisional Government Council at the CLNAI itself in Milan; future member of the Constituent Assembly and deputy in the I, II and III legislatures
- Carlo Calcaterra, as a member of the Consultative Didactic Commission for school reform with democratic imprint; would teach at the Catholic University of Milan and the University of Bologna, becoming a celebrated critic and historian of Italian literature
- Cipriano Facchinetti, as representative of the Provisional Government Council at the CLNAI in Lugano; future deputy to the Constituent Assembly, senator by right in the first and subsequent legislatures, minister of War in the second De Gasperi government and of Defense in the fourth De Gasperi government.
- Concetto Marchesi, who fled to Switzerland after his call for antifascist struggle in Padua as rector, had returned to Italy to assist as a private citizen in the Ossola experience.

== Political and administrative activities ==
Each Commissioner carried out the tasks pertaining to him, with the help of the assigned Collaborators. However, matters of major importance were always dealt with in the Council, during frequent evening and daytime meetings. While the activity of the Council was mainly aimed at coping with the difficulties of the moment, every act and measure was constantly inspired by a concern to enforce the principles of democracy, civil justice and social progress. These founding elements would later be fully taken up by the nascent Italian Constitution.

=== Relations with national authorities and coordination with people's initiatives ===
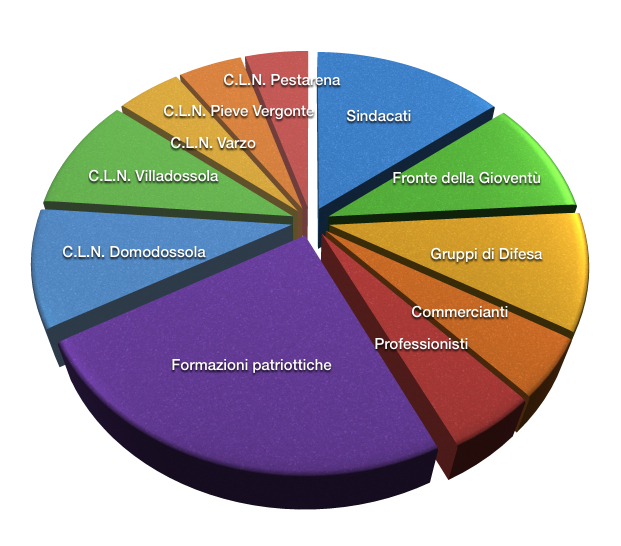
Composition of the hypothetical People's Council of Government.

The democratically constituted Council of Domodossola is today the clearest proof of a way by which the high civic qualities of the Italian people regain freedom and harmony in spite of the attempted destruction made by a regime of oppression.

— Ivanoe Bonomi, The President's telegram to the Provisional Government Council.

The Council endeavored to maintain relations with national political organizations, both to see their authority validated and to obtain help and advice. While in fact maintaining a degree of decision-making and administrative autonomy, it always remained dependent on the CLNAI, a source of authority and prestige, as evidenced by its extensive correspondence in letters. However, some disagreements arose initially: immediately after the establishment of the Council, a missive from the CLNAI informed the Provisional Government that foreign relations were totally outside the competence of the Council, since the latter had to maintain exclusively relations with the CLNAI itself, also declaring null and void the act of establishment by Major Dionigi Superti. Since this was in fact liberated national territory, the competence over the appointment of civil administration councils did not belong to the military commanders but to the CLNAI, which, however, ratified what the major had already ordered. The unease on the part of the G.P.G. was set forth in a missive directed to the CLNAI in Lugano, in which it was pointed out that there was a need to handle international issues related to daily life, the Ossola Valley being a border area. Agreement was then reached through the appointment of a representative to the Lugano CLNAI, Hon. Cipriano Facchinetti. Once the differences with the CLNAI were resolved, the Council was also recognized by the National Government in Rome, with which it sought direct liaison several times. In fact, the then President Ivanoe Bonomi wrote two telegrams to the G.P.G., praising its work and providing maximum support:

The Patriots of the Ossola Valley who alone by their own efforts and with limited means and great valor restored a strip of the homeland to freedom have written a page of great heroism in the war against the Nazi-fascist oppressor. They are the symbol of the new spirit that pervades the whole Italian people in the battle for its redemption, and this is worthy of the highest traditions of our resurgence.

— Ivanoe Bonomi, The President's telegram to the Provisional Government Council

Another concern of the Council was to maintain the most relaxed relations possible with the population, encouraging every demonstration and establishing immediate citizen control over the political and administrative activities of the established body. To this end, the reconstitution and affirmation of the Zone C.L.N. was stimulated; close links were maintained with trade unions, parties and mass organizations; the local press was promoted; rallies and public demonstrations were held. In addition to this, the Council had in mind a direct convening criterion with a People's Council of Government. In the draft, it was to consist of twenty-one members representing the most diverse organizations and categories (from members of local C.L.N.'s to merchants and professionals), who were to cooperate with each Commissioner of the Council. This body was to meet every 10 days and would oversee the activities of the G.P.G.. It would have been a de facto faithful expression of citizens' thoughts and interests, albeit within the limits imposed by circumstances. However, the precipitation of events did not then allow the implementation of this intention.

=== Relations with Switzerland ===
Help given today is worth a hundred times what could be given tomorrow. Let us all together ensure that Canton Ticino is also worthy of its noblest and highest traditions in this circumstance.

— Guglielmo Canevascini, Helping the people of Ossola

Relations with the Swiss Confederation gave rise to important manifestations of solidarity, which contributed to the struggle for Liberation. The Swiss Red Cross Delegate for Relief to Italy accompanied the first train of provisions (potatoes, flour, meat, milk) and medicines to Domodossola on September 22, 1944, which would be followed by many others. Guglielmo Canevascini, Ticino's state councilor, after noting the situation in the valley wrote to the Ticino population, "I have visited the liberated Ossola. The food situation is tragic. The civilian population of the region - 60,000 people, excluding the military - is reduced to hunger [...] Everything is lacking; one encounters everywhere, amidst a noble and dignified pride that is in the behavior of the people, just squalor and misery." Following the appeal, several welfare works were initiated towards the Ossola: among them, a committee formed in Canton Ticino came to the aid of the Ossola children, whereby more than 2,000 of them were housed by Swiss families, to save them from the famine; later the same aid was reserved for Ossola refugees. National councilors Francesco Borella, Karl Dellberg, Locarno Mayor G.B. Rusca and influential journalists also visited Domodossola. In this regard, many prominent Swiss newspapers, including the Gazette de Lausanne and Tribune de Genève also followed the affair closely, reporting accurately on the development of events.

=== Political-administrative organization of the territory ===
The Provisional Government Council, in homage to the principle of the autonomy of the Local Authorities, at a session on the 22nd corr. resolved to renounce administrative control of the Authorities themselves, referring this task to the Local Liberation Committees

— G.P.G. Circular to the Municipalities of the Liberated Zone

Initially, while waiting for the Zone and local C.L.N. to be operational, the Council provided for the appointment of an Extraordinary Commissioner for each municipality, replacing the Podestà and prefectural commissioners, so that political and administrative continuity would be guaranteed. Subsequently, with the establishment of the C.L.N., Municipal Councils consisting of five members (Mayor and four Councillors) were appointed and established in each municipality, assisted by Popular Municipal Councils. The Municipal Council of Domodossola was composed, through inter-party negotiations, of five members, with Mayor Carlo Lightowler, a Socialist. Importantly, the G.P.G left maximum autonomy to the Local Authorities, limiting guardianship ratification to very few acts. The constitution of councils in almost all municipalities having taken place, the function of the Commissioner for Administrative Organization was limited to the resolution of local problems and the coordination of relations between the different municipalities.

=== Relations with partisan formations and their commands ===
The different formations involved in the partisan struggle during the Ossola Republic
Formation	Location
Valdossola Division	Territory to the left of the Toce from Mergozzo to Domodossola and Masera
Valtoce Division	Territory to the right of the Toce from Mergozzo to Domodossola excluding Villadossola
85th Garibaldi Brigade "Valgrande Martyr"	Intra area
83rd Garibaldi Brigade "Comolli"	Villadossola, Valle Antrona, Valle Anzasca, Bognanco
10th Garibaldi Brigade	Valle Antigorio and Val Formazza
Piave Division	Valle Vigezzo and Val Cannobina
8th Matteotti Brigade	Garrison in the Vigezzo Valley and deployment in Antigorio and Lower Ossola.
Beltrami Brigade	Val Strona

There were many partisan formations in the liberated Zone. Coordination of all divisions was necessary in order to achieve an effective offensive and defensive response, but old differences and disagreements among the different militias made this difficult to achieve. After several negotiations, the commanders of the different formations were brought together and all agreed on a possible Single Command. For this purpose Marco Federici (born Giovanni Battista Stucchi), formerly at the Military Command Alta Italia, was appointed by CLNAI. Various military and political issues, however, made it difficult to accept this appointment, so the Council was forced several times to mediate. After long and complex discussions, it was possible to convince everyone at least on the need for a Single Military Office, coordinator of operations and all initiatives of the Ossola formations, with the authority to convene a general military council. The Unified Commander Federici was at that point able to coordinate offensive and defensive plans, maintaining contact with each formation.

The Council, assuming that it was up to it to administer the reserves of material and provisions, also sought to distribute equally among the population and the different formations what was produced or came in aid from Switzerland. To this end it regulated, through the persuasive action of its commissioners, the long-standing questions about requisitions, which were being carried out arbitrarily by some militias. A series of rules were drafted, by the G.P.G. and the commands of the formations, specifying, in the event of violation of these rules, the complaint "to the Investigating Judge for interim measures and to the C.L.N.A.I. for the indictment before the War Tribunal or the adjournment of the trial before the Judicial Authority of the Italian Government." While it was never able to have total control of the territory as far as this issue was concerned, especially in the more peripheral areas, the G.P.G. always tried to keep as its main objective the reparations due to each community.

=== Police and public order ===
In addition to the issues related to unauthorized requisitions, there were a number of issues related to public order, political security in the area, and guarding the border crossings. First, the existing police force was purged, with the removal of Nazi-Fascist officers and officials. The resulting corps, although reinforced by a few volunteer elements, was nevertheless barely sufficient for the maintenance of public order in the city and political security.

Composition of the National Guard Corps
Force	Officers	Petty officers	Guards
General Command	1	1	3
Financial Guards	3	25	73
Institute Service	1	13	185
Mobile department	3	6	94
Special team w/ police comm.	3	1	9

A volunteer National Guard Corps was therefore established, dependent on the Military Command, with the task of assisting internal law and order and garrisoning the borders of Ponte Ribellasca, Paglino and the Iselle railroad customs house. Colonel Attilio Moneta of Malesco was appointed to head the National Guard. This corps, although made up exclusively of volunteers with a distinctly military and patriotic character, assumed the tasks already belonging to the Carabinieri, Forestry Militia and Guardia di Finanza. The following forces were established within the National Guard:

- General Headquarters: was to provide for the discipline and administration of the various departments.
- Finance and Tax Guard: fulfilled the services already performed by the Finance Guard.
- Forest Guard: provided for the duties already performed by the Forestry Militia.
- Institute Service: was in charge of public order and judicial police, a service already performed by the Royal Carabinieri Corps.
- Mobile Department.
- Special squad detached at the Police Department.

However, the establishment of such a corps created various discontents within the various partisan formations, which already possessed their own police corps and felt their authority undermined. In this sense, members of the National Guard were often misunderstood and humiliated, partly due to the absence of uniforms or weapons, given the paucity of resources. Here, too, the mediation work of the Council was instrumental in soothing ill-feeling, and it saw to it that the areas of responsibility of its police organs were distinguished from those of the patriotic police. Attempts were also made to unify the police services, but this plan did not come to fruition due to the too short period in which the Ossola Republic existed.

=== Justice administration ===
Valiant war or guerrilla operations were conducted, accompanied and followed by the most judicious and temperate work of justice. [...] The generous people of the Ossola, who were the first to give the sign of redemption in Northern Italy, were exemplary in this, too: in moderation with respect to their debauched adversaries.

— Alessandro Levi, Nessuna Rappresaglia

The provisional nature of the G.P.G., coupled with the uncertainty over what legislation to apply and the absence of directives from the government in Rome, imposed caution in adopting measures pertaining to justice. Nevertheless, the principles that inspired the Council were heavily marked by a strongly reforming idea of fairness, legality and freedom of the individual, values that were later fully taken up by the Italian Constitution.

For the conduct of ordinary trials, the Praetor was dismissed for collaborationism and in his place Dr. Giuseppe Darioli was appointed Deputy Praetor. It was also decreed that from that moment all sentences would be handed down "In the name of the Nation." For political investigations, instead, an Extraordinary Judge was established, lawyer Ezio Vigorelli, future Minister of Labor and Social Policies and member of the Constituent Assembly. His powers were limited to orders for indictment, internment and release of defendants; in the latter case, however, the opinion of the Police Commissioner was required. In no case, however, would final verdicts of either acquittal or conviction be issued.

Given the large number of political prisoners locked up at the city jail (which had a maximum capacity of 40 people), a concentration camp was set up at Druogno in the Vigezzo Valley. As of October 2, 1944, 150 arrests had already been made and it was estimated that another 400 collaborationists or fascists deemed dangerous would be rounded up. A Commission for the Purge was also established, appointed by the area C.L.N., consisting of four party representatives and two citizens known for honesty and antifascist spirit, with the task of proposing measures that would then be ratified by the Council.

The Council also adopted a set of criteria inspired by principles of fairness and justice:

- the summoning in investigation, with subpoena, of all neo-fascists so that they could prove that they had not committed any act against the patriots;
- the arrest of all those who were chargeable for acts of collaborationism or contrary to the independence and honor of the homeland;
- respect, in any detainee, for the human person and dignity, as a fundamental criterion to be opposed to fascist inquisition;
- the utmost promptness in reporting all arrests to the judge, in carrying out the preliminary formalities and in issuing the order;
- the exclusion of any interference, even and especially by military leaders.

With the adoption of such criteria, despite the dramatic context, during the period of the Ossola liberation there were no disturbances of public order or crimes of any kind, not even death sentences. This can be attributed to the person of Ezio Vigorelli, who always refused vindictive justice, despite the fact that his two sons were shot by the Nazi-Fascists in the June 1944 roundups. Of him it is recalled that, on a visit to the Druogno concentration camp, hearing the internees sawing wood to the rhythm "Du-ce, du-ce" he exclaimed, "No, work done unwillingly has no re-educational value." In essence, in applying the measures inherent in justice, there was always extreme fairness, civility, impartiality and inflexibility. Alessandro Levi, a famous jurist and anti-fascist, wrote about this:

This very rare case of a country war that does not degenerate into an unfortunate sequence of violence on both sides, should be pointed out, in my opinion, as the example of the most difficult victory, that is, over one's own most instinctive feelings and resentments. Had such an example been, and still be, for everywhere known and followed, easier would have been the reform of civil custom, which every man, thoughtful of the fate of this poor country of ours, must help to bring about as necessary and urgent.

— Alessandro Levi, Nessuna Rappresaglia

== Flag ==
According to Bocca, the flag of the republic was to be a red, green and blue tricolor, in tribute to all the partisan military formations that had participated in the liberation and defense of the Ossola Free Territory. Each partisan group then had its own insignia. Green was the one of "Justice and Freedom," red was that of the Garibaldian formations, and blue was that of the royalists.

Flag of the Ossola Partisan Republic used according to Bocca (September 8, 1944 - October 23, 1944)

Flag of the Ossola Partisan Republic used by the Blue Brigades (September 8, 1944 - October 23, 1944)

== See also ==
- Domodossola
- Ossola
- Province of Verbano-Cusio-Ossola

== Bibliography ==
- Mario Giarda; Giulio Maggia, eds. (1974). Il Governo dell'Ossola. Istituto storico della Resistenza in Provincia di Novara e in Valsesia. Novara: Grafica Novarese.
- Filippo Frassati, ed. (1984). La Repubblica dell'Ossola. Domodossola: Comune di Domodossola.
- Edgardo Ferrari, ed. (2001). La "repubblica" dell'Ossola - Guida alla storia ed ai luoghi. Domodossola: Grossi.
- Fiamma Lussana, ed. (1999). Una storia nella Storia. Gisella Floreanini e l'antifascismo italiano dalla clandestinità al dopoguerra. Roma: Res Cogitans.
- Giorgio Bocca (1964). Una repubblica partigiana. La resistenza in Val d'Ossola. Milano: Il Saggiatore.
- Hubertus Bergwitz (1979). Una libera repubblica nell'Ossola partigiana. Novara: Istituto Storico della Resistenza in Provincia di Novara.
- Azzari, Anita (1983). Mario Bonfantini. Saggi e ricordi. Valstrona (NO): Lo Strona.
- Azzari, Anita (1954). L'Ossola nella Resistenza italiana. Domodossola: Cartografica Antonioli.
- Giorgio Bocca (1966). Storia dell'Italia partigiana. Settembre 1943-maggio 1945. Bari: Laterza.
- Vassalli, Giuliano (1997). "Dalla "Repubblica" dell'Ossola alla Costituzione repubblicana". In Aldo Aniasi (ed.). Ne valeva la pena. Milano: M&B.
- Beltrami, Michele (1975). Il Governo dell'Ossola Partigiana. Milano-Roma: Sapere Edizioni.
- Storia d'Italia (pag. 498) - Mondadori 1978.
- Eugenio Corti (1999). Il cavallo rosso (13 ed.). Edizioni Ares. p. 1280.
- Giuseppe Caviglioli (1979). "La partigiana Maria Peron". Novara (2). Novara: Camera di Commercio Industria e Artigianato di Novara: 1–9.
- Luigi Pellanda (1954). L'Ossola nella tempesta. Dal settembre 1939 alla liberazione. Tip. Provera. p. 145.
- Nino Chiovini (2005). I giorni della semina. Tararà.
- Aldo Aniasi. La Resistenza in Val d'Ossola: la Brigata Ossola - Garibaldi Redi (1944 - 1945). Fondazione Aldo Aniasi.
- Raphael Rues, Andrej Abplanalp (2025). Kampfzone Ossola: der Widerstand an der Schweizer Südgrenze 1943-1945 (in German). Hier und Jetzt. ISBN 978-3-03919-666-1.
