= Domodossola Town Hall =

- Palazzo di Città di Domodossola (Italian)
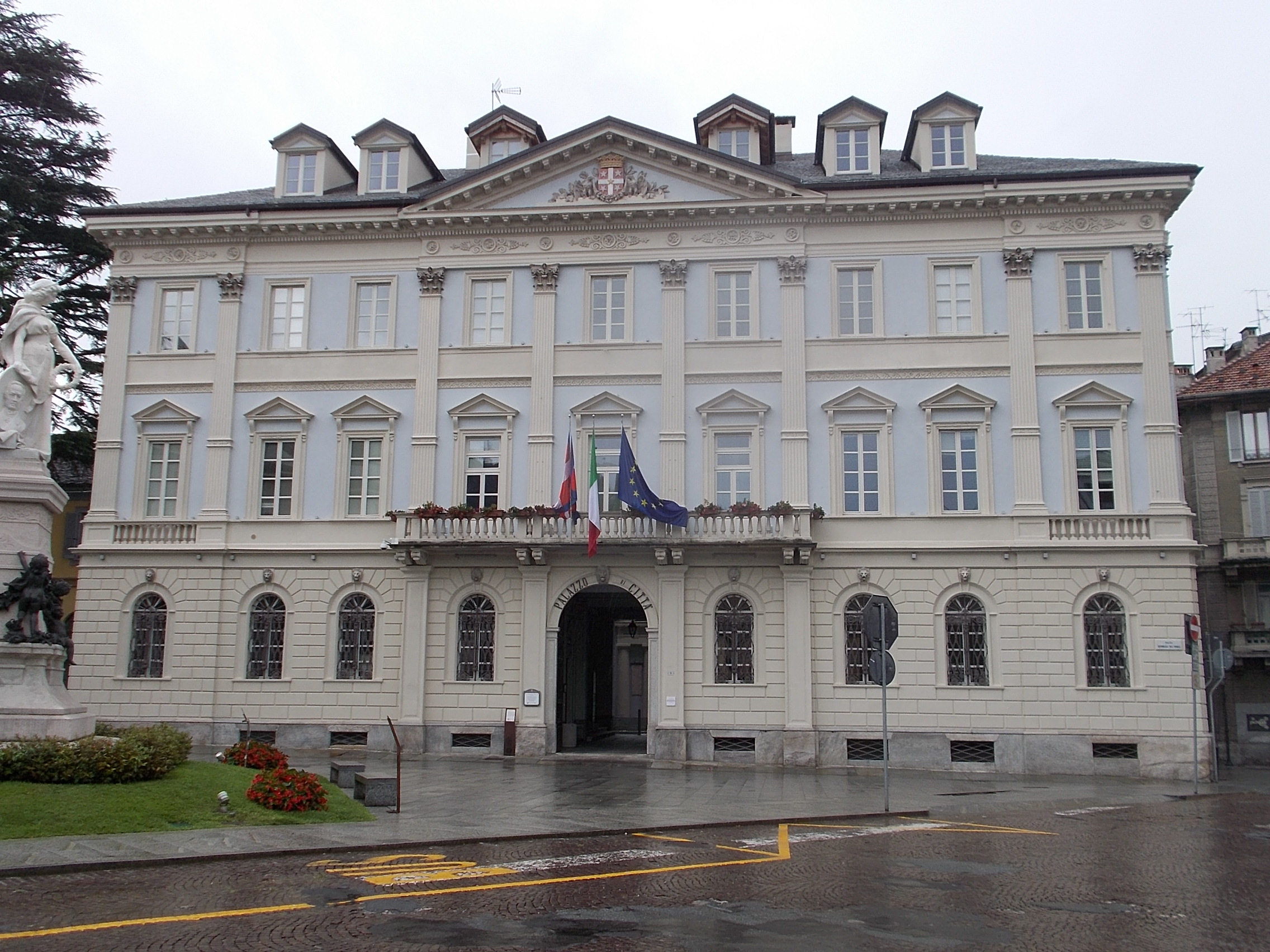
- Domodossola Town Hall in 2017
- Click on the map for a fullscreen view

General information
- Location: Domodossola, Italy
- Coordinates: 46°06′55.08″N 8°17′31.7″E

Domodossola Town Hall (Italian: Palazzo di Città di Domodossola) is the town hall of the town and comune of Domodossola in Italy.

== History ==
The building, designed by architect Giovanni Leoni, was constructed in 1847. In 1899, in front of the palace, a monument by Francesco Ricci, a sculptor from the Vigezzo Valley, was erected in honor of Gian Giacomo Galletti, a local benefactor whose bequest gave rise to the Galletti Foundation.

In 1944, the building served as the seat of the Provisional Government Council of the Ossola Partisan Republic.

== Description ==
The building stands on Piazza della Repubblica dell’Ossola, in the center of Domodossola.

It features a Neoclassical style, with symmetrical façades. Inside, it houses the Historical Hall of the Resistance.

== Gallery ==
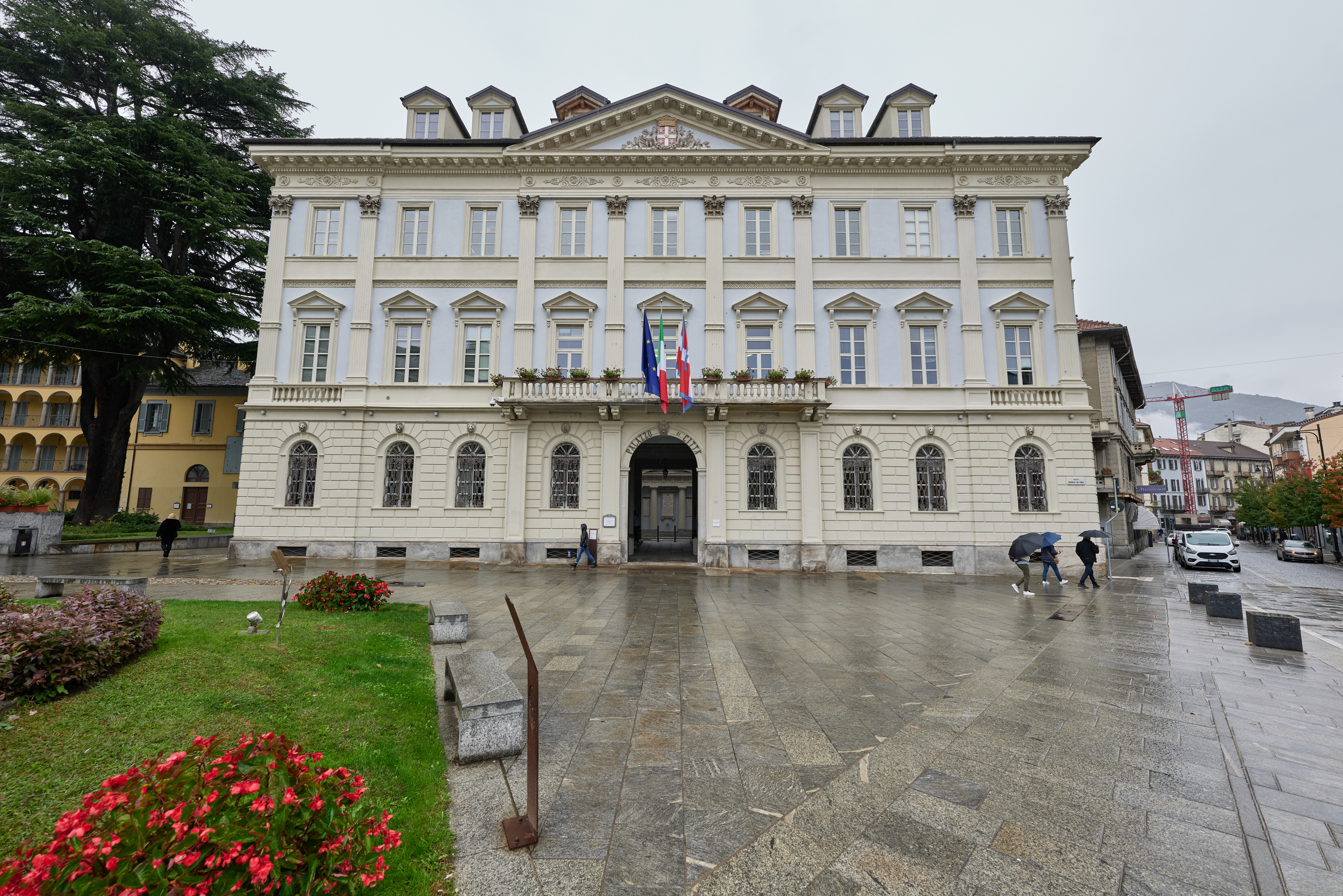

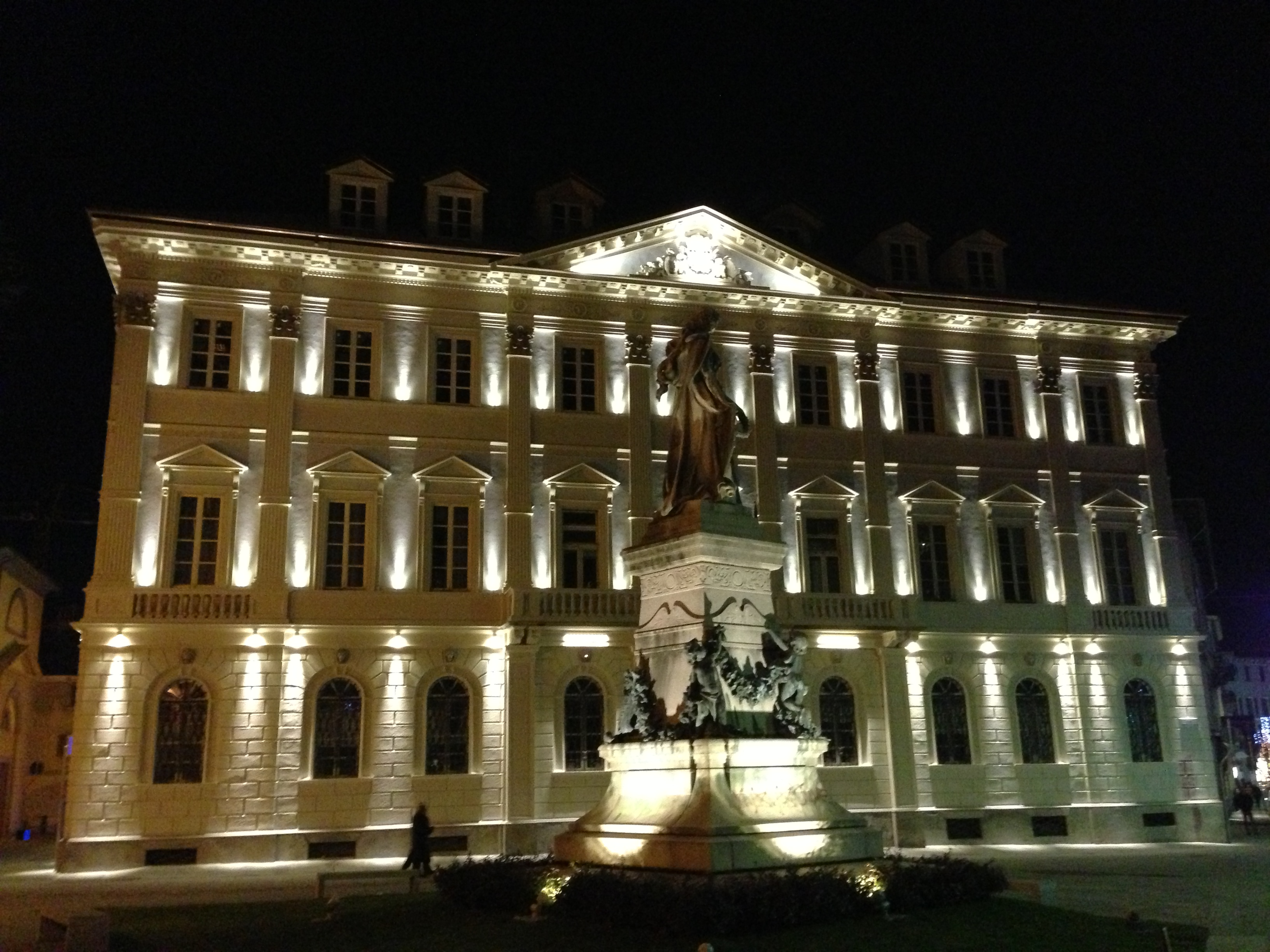

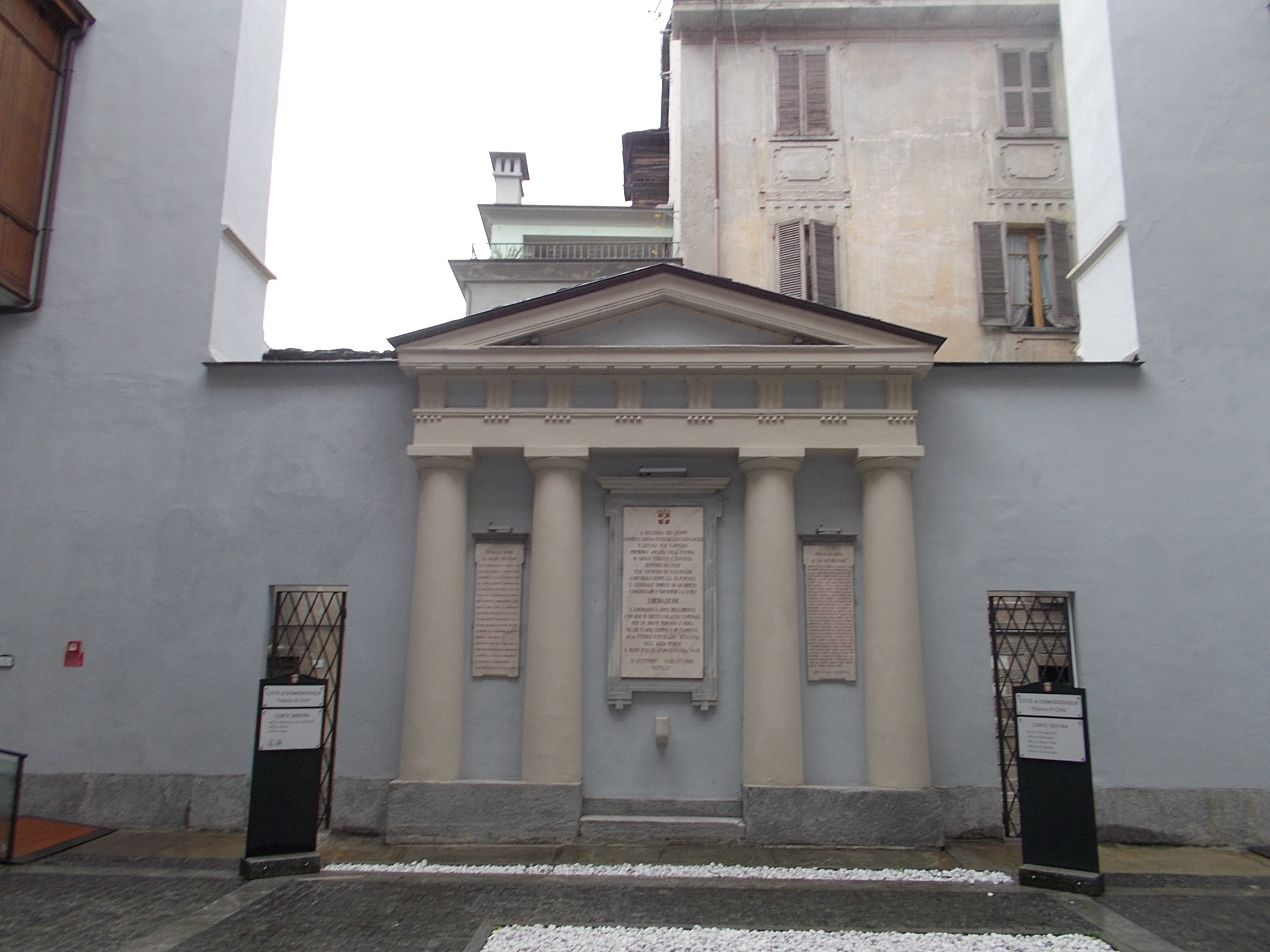
