= Lago di Mergozzo =

Lake in Piedmont, Italy

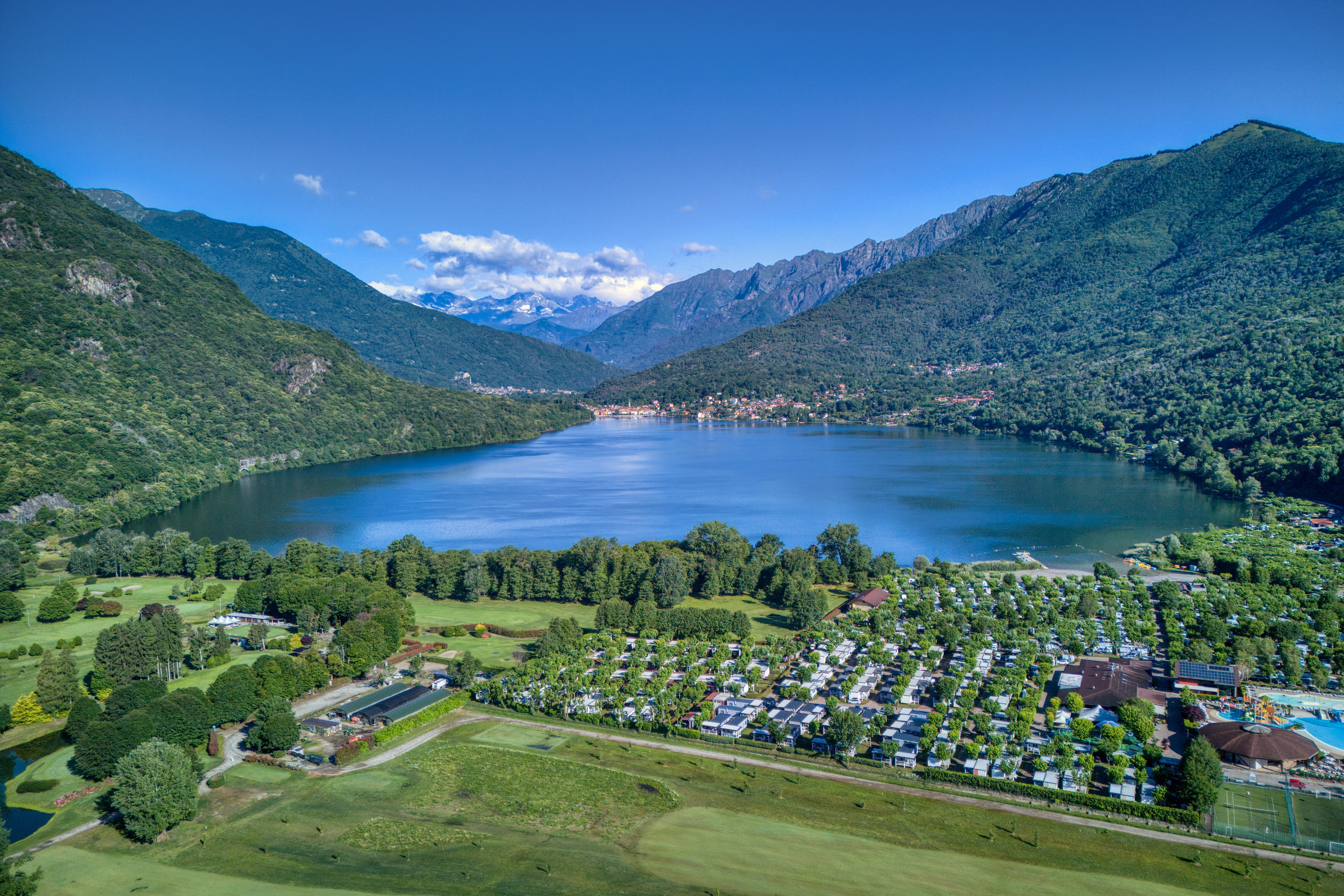

- Location within Piedmont
- Location: Piedmont
- Coordinates: 45°57′20″N 8°28′00″E
- Primary inflows: mountain streams including the Rio della Peste and the Rio Resiga
- Primary outflows: a 2.7 km canal into Lago Maggiore
- Catchment area: 10.4 km^{2} (4.0 sq mi)
- Basin countries: Italy
- Max. length: 2.32 km (1.44 mi)
- Max. width: 1.1 km (0.68 mi)
- Surface area: 1.81 km^{2} (0.70 sq mi)
- Average depth: 45 m (148 ft)
- Max. depth: 73 m (240 ft)
- Water volume: 82.9×10^{6} m^{3} (2.93×10^{9} cu ft)
- Residence time: 6 years
- Shore length^{1}: 6.2 km (3.9 mi)
- Surface elevation: 195 m (640 ft)
- Settlements: Mergozzo, Fondotoce (Verbania)
- ^{1} Shore length is not a well-defined measure.

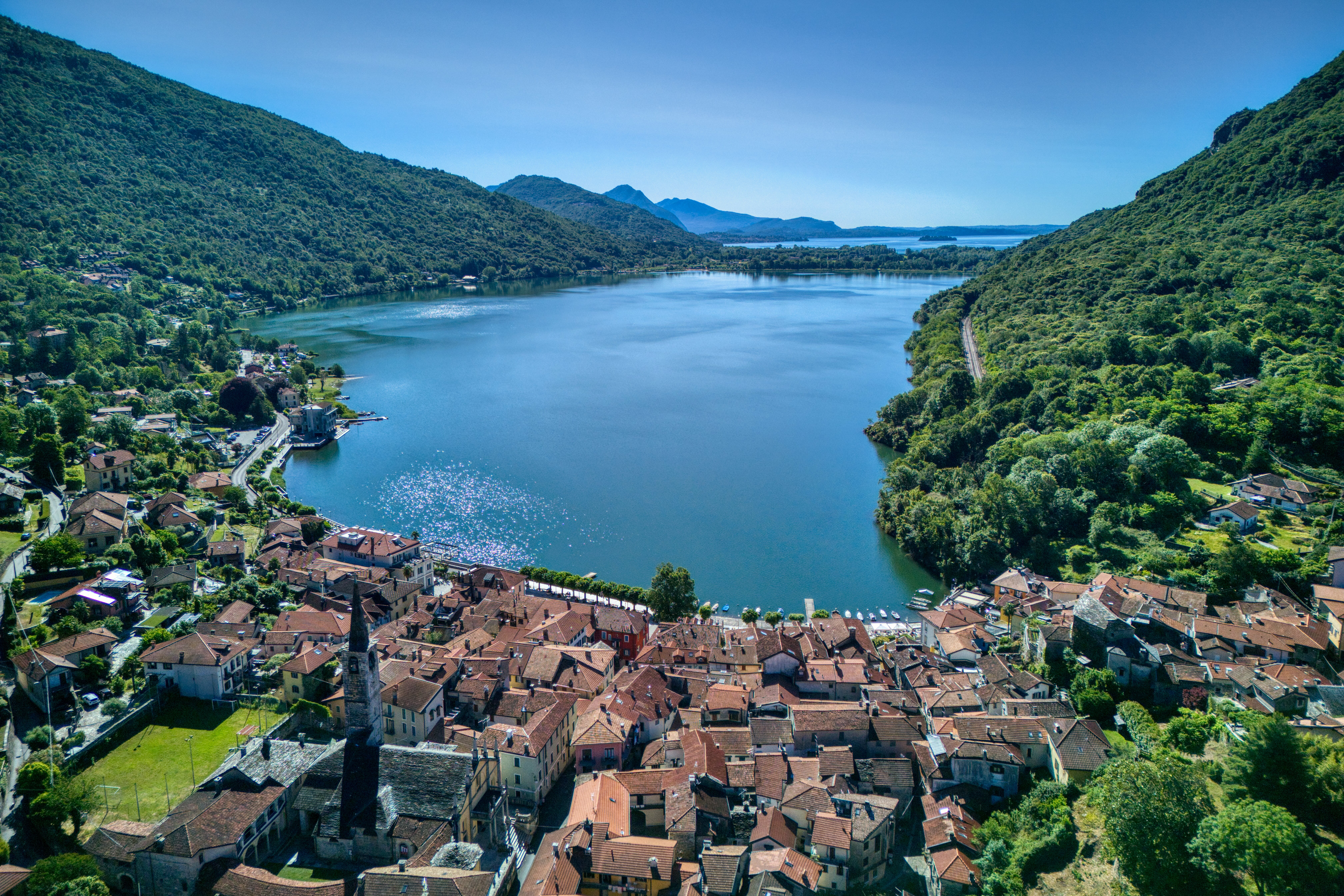
Mergozzo

Lago di Mergozzo (En. Lake Mergozzo) is a small sub-alpine lake in northern Italy just to the west of Lago Maggiore and north of Lago d'Orta, at the mouth of the Val d’Ossola in the province of Verbano Cusio Ossola, Piedmont.

In ancient times, it was the extreme point of the short northwestern arm of Lago Maggiore, formed by glaciation. However repeated flooding of Maggiore's tributary the Toce deposited sediment which gradually formed a stretch of land which cut off Mergozzo from the larger expanse of water, and from the Toce itself. Today, the settlement of Fondotoce (a frazione of Verbania) stands on this alluvial plain. The small town Mergozzo, which lies at the other end of the lake, gives it its name. The greater part of the lake falls within the commune of Mergozzo, the rest within Verbania.

Monte Orfano (790 m) rises from the southwest shore of the lake; the limestone rocks of which it is composed are heavily quarried. On the opposite side of the lake the mountains form the beginning of the Corni di Nibbio chain which divides the Val d'Ossola from the Valgrande and its National Park.

The lake is fed by the waters of a number of clean mountain streams, the two most important being the Rio Bracchio and the Rio Rescina. Its sole outlet is the 2.7 kilometres (1.7 mi) canal which links it to Lago Maggiore near Fondotoce. The difference in levels between the two lakes is slight, and when Maggiore is in flood, the flow of water in the canal goes into reverse. This opens up the possibility of pollutants entering Lago Mergozzo. Nevertheless, today the lake, where the use of motorboats has long been forbidden, is one of the least polluted in Italy; it has become a tourist destination particularly popular with people from Germany and the Netherlands.

== Fish ==
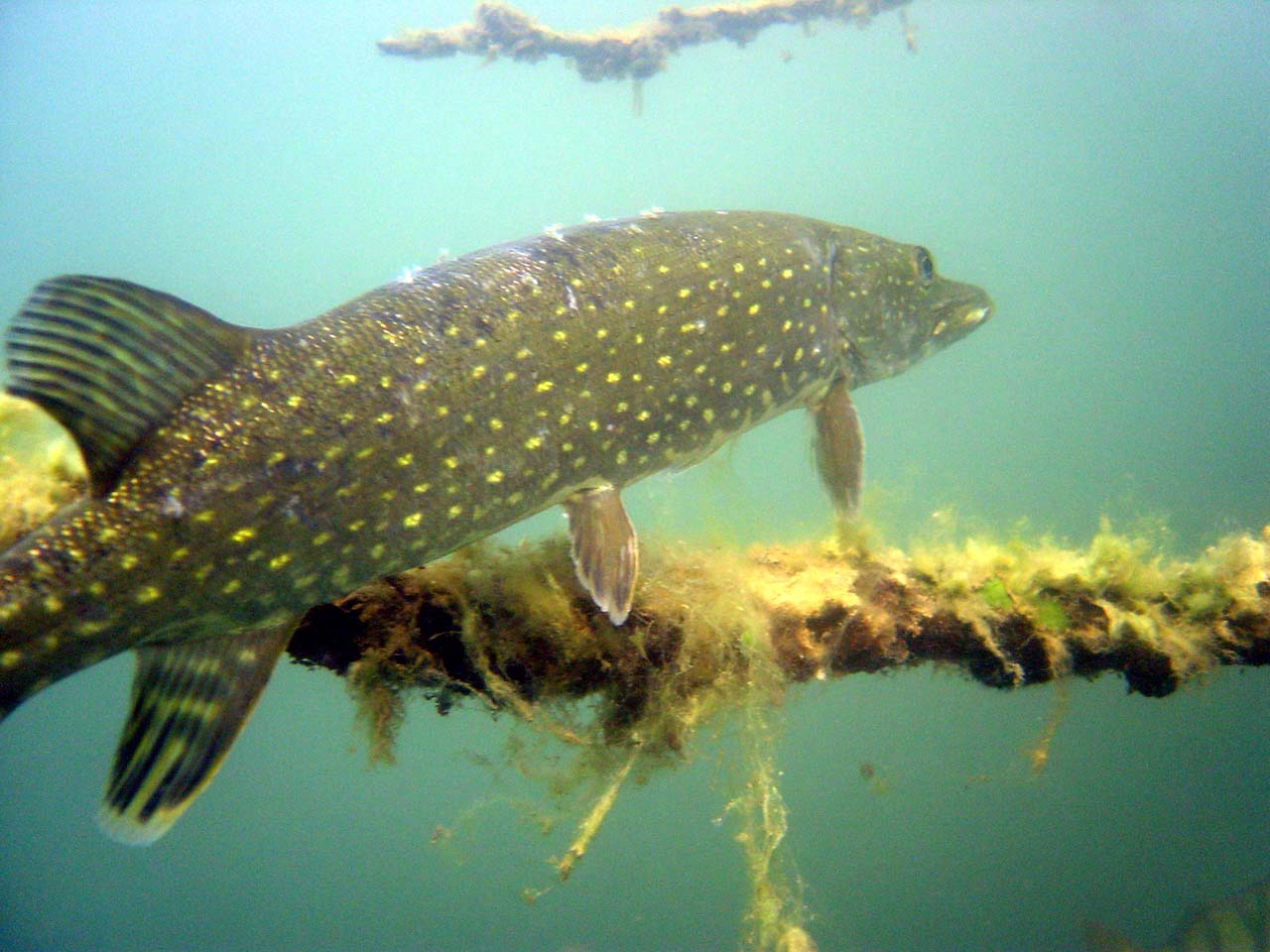
A pike

Species found in the lake include, pikeperch, common whitefish, brown trout, Arctic char, bleak, chub, Danube roach (Rutilus pigus), common carp, rudd, tench, triotto (Rutilus aula), savetta, or Italian nase (Chondrostoma soetta), twait shad, northern pike, perch, black bass, pumpkinseed (Lepomis gibbosus), Largemouth bass, eel and burbot.
