= Gisella Floreanini =

Italian teacher and politician (1906–1993)

Member of the Parliament
- In office 1948–1958

Personal details
- Born: 3 April 1906 Milan, Kingdom of Italy
- Died: 30 May 1993 (aged 87) Milan, Italy
- Party: Italian Communist Party
- Spouse: Gianni Todaro
- Children: 1
- Occupation: Politician

Gisella Floreanini (3 April 1906 – 30 May 1993) was an Italian teacher and politician who was an anti-fascist activist and was a member of the Italian Parliament between 1948 and 1958.

== Early life and education ==
Floreanini was born in Milan on 3 April 1906. She graduated from a conservatory and worked as a teacher during which she became familiar with the anti-Fascist movement.

== Anti-fascist activities and exile ==
Following the murder of Giacomo Matteotti in June 1924 Floreanini exiled into Lugano, Switzerland, where she collaborated with other anti-fascist figures. She briefly returned to Italy in 1929, but left the country again for Lugano. In 1942 she joined the Italian Communist Party. In late 1943 she settled in Italy where she continued her struggle against the Fascists. She was arrested by the Swiss police while carrying the documents for anti-fascists groups. She was imprisoned for four months. Following her release from prison she joined the partisans in Val d'Ossola and held a cabinet post in the Partisan Republic of Ossola between September and October 1944. She was responsible for the women defense groups.

Floreanini was among the contributors of the communist magazine Rinascita which was started in 1944.

== Political career ==
Floreanini was named a member of the National Council in 1946. She was elected to the Parliament for the constituency of Novara-Turin-Vercelli for the Communist Party in the general elections in 1948 and in 1953. She did not run for a seat in the 1958 election. She was a member of the Federation of the Italian Communist Party in Novara and a municipal councilor both in Novara and in Domodossola. From 1963 to 1968 she was also a city councilor in Milan.

Between 1959 and 1963 Floreanini was a member of the secretariat of the International Women Federation in Berlin and in 1965 she became director of the Union of Italian Women and National Association of Italian Partisans.

== Personal life and death ==
Floreanini married Gianni Todaro with whom she had a daughter. She returned from exile in 1929, and during this period her husband died. Her second husband, Vittorio Della Porta, was a physician who left her when she was in prison in 1944. They later divorced in Switzerland, but it was not recognized in Italy. Due to this Floreanini experienced problems in being a candidate for the National Council.

Floreanini died of cardiac arrest in Milan on 30 May 1993.
