= Alfredo Di Dio =

Italian Army officer (1920–1944)

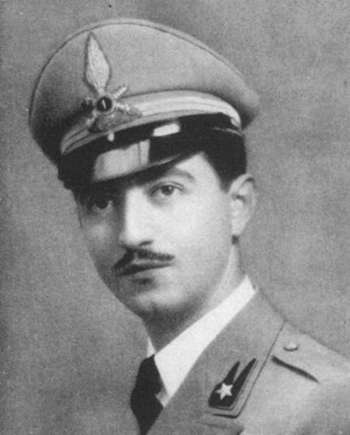
- Born: 4 July 1920; Palermo, Kingdom of Italy
- Died: 12 October 1944 (aged 24); Malesco, Republic of Ossola
- Military career
- Allegiance: Kingdom of Italy
- Branch: Royal Italian Army
- Service years: 1939-1943
- Rank: Lieutenant
- Commands: "Valtoce" Partisan Division
- Conflicts: World War II
- Awards: Gold Medal of Military Valour (posthumous)

Alfredo Di Dio (4 July 1920 – 12 October 1944) was an Italian officer and Resistance leader during World War II.

== Biography ==
After attending high school in Cremona, where his family lived, in 1939 he was admitted to the Military Academy of Modena, from which he graduated in 1941 with the rank of second lieutenant, being assigned to the 1st Tank Regiment in Vercelli as an instructor; he was later promoted to lieutenant. On 8 September 1943, following the proclamation of the Armistice of Cassibile, he presented himself to his commander and asked to organize resistance against the Germans, but was refused. As German forces disarmed the Royal Italian Army and occupied most of Italy, Di Dio headed for the Ossola Valley together with a group of soldiers; in Cavaglio d'Agogna, he was joined here by his younger brother Antonio, a cadet officer in the Royal Italian Army. The group reached Valstrona, where they formed a partisan group, of which Di Dio became the leader. In December 1943, this group was merged with another one, led by Filippo Beltrami, forming the "Valstrona Patriots Brigade". Beltrami was the overall commander, with Di Dio (nom de guerre "Marco") as his deputy.

In late December 1943, Di Dio went to Novara, where he arranged an exchange of prisoners with the local RSI authorities; the exchange took place in Armeno on January 8, 1944. Subsequently, Di Dio decided, in agreement with Beltrami, to go to Milan to obtain funding for training from the National Liberation Committee. On 23 January, Alfredo left with his escort for Milan, but there he was captured by the Fascists and imprisoned in Novara; while he was in prison, his partisan group suffered a severe blow as his brother Antonio and Beltrami were killed in combat in Megolo on 13 February. Di Dio managed to escape after a month and gathered more partisans to build the "Beltrami" Alpine Brigade, of which he became commander. The unit, of Catholic orientation, was later enlarged and renamed "Valtoce" Division, and would grow to a force of 20,000 men in 1945; its members wore a blue handkerchief around their necks. In August–September 1944, Di Dio and the "Valtoce" Division played a large role in the liberation of Domodossola from the Germans and Fascists and in the establishment of the Republic of Ossola. On 10 October, the Axis launched a counteroffensive aimed at retaking the Ossola Valley, and two days later, Di Dio, while inspecting partisan positions near Malesco, was ambushed and killed by German troops along with Colonel Attilio Moneta, commander of the short-lived National Guard of the Ossola Republic. He was posthumously awarded the Gold Medal of Military Valor; the 7th Tank Battalion "M.O. Di Dio" of the postwar Italian Army was named after him.
