= Cascata del Toce =

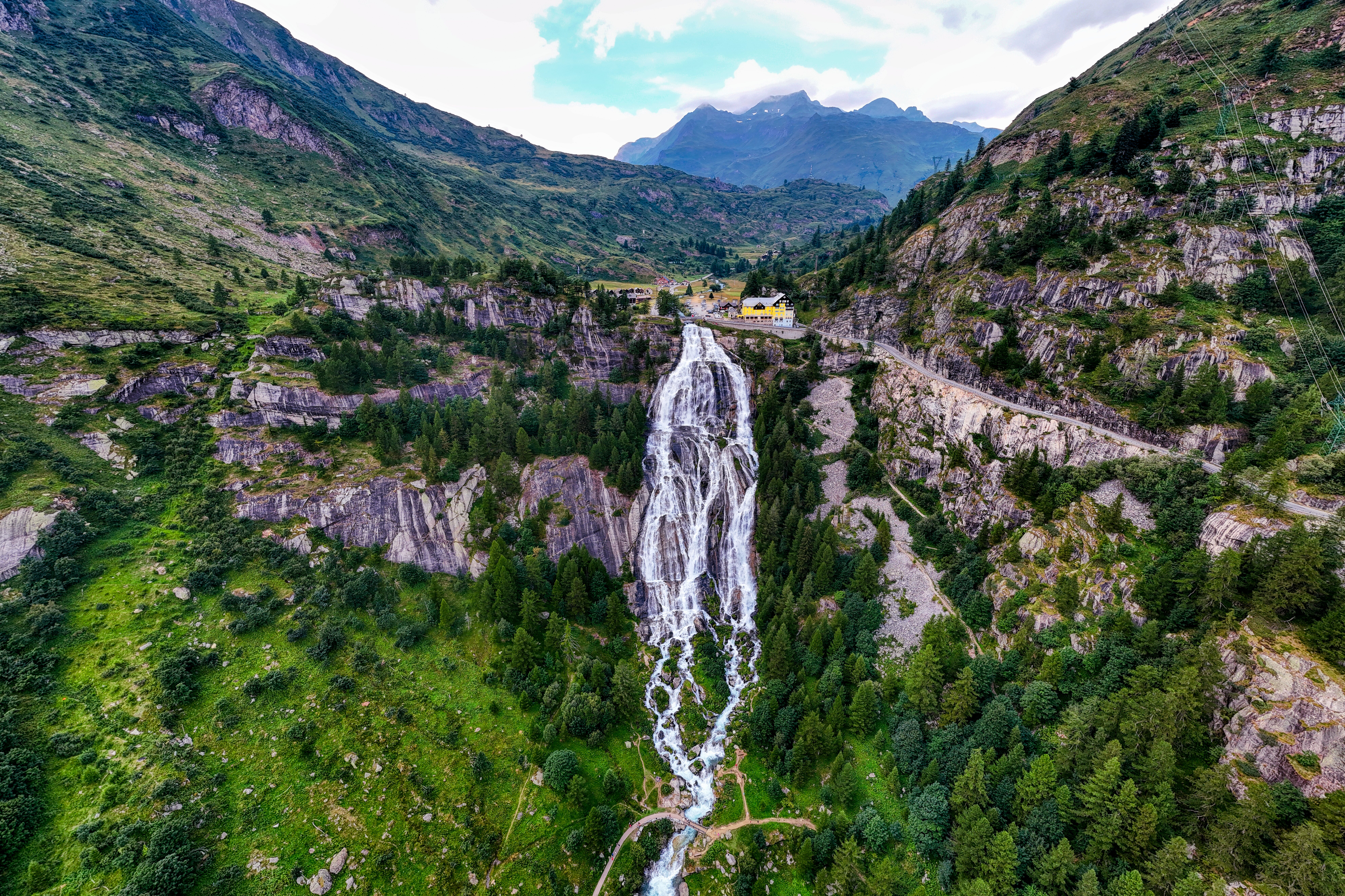
- Cascata del Toce

- Location within Italy
- Location: Formazza, Piedmont, Italy
- Coordinates: 46°24′28.8″N 08°24′46.8″E
- Elevation: 1,675 m (5,495 ft)
- Total height: 143 m (469 ft)
- Watercourse: Toce

Cascata del Toce (Italian pronunciation: [kaˈskaːta del ˈtoːtʃe]) or La Frua, also known as Frütt Fall in Walser dialect, is a waterfall on the river Toce, located in the municipality of Formazza, Piedmont, Italy, at 1675 m above the sea level. It takes the name from the river Toce. The waterfall has 143 m of vertical drop and it is 60 m wide (at the base). The waterfall is only completely visible in summer months, during certain hours, as its waters are used for hydroelectric purposes.

== See also ==
- List of waterfalls
