= Mergozzo =

- Comune
- Comune di Mergozzo
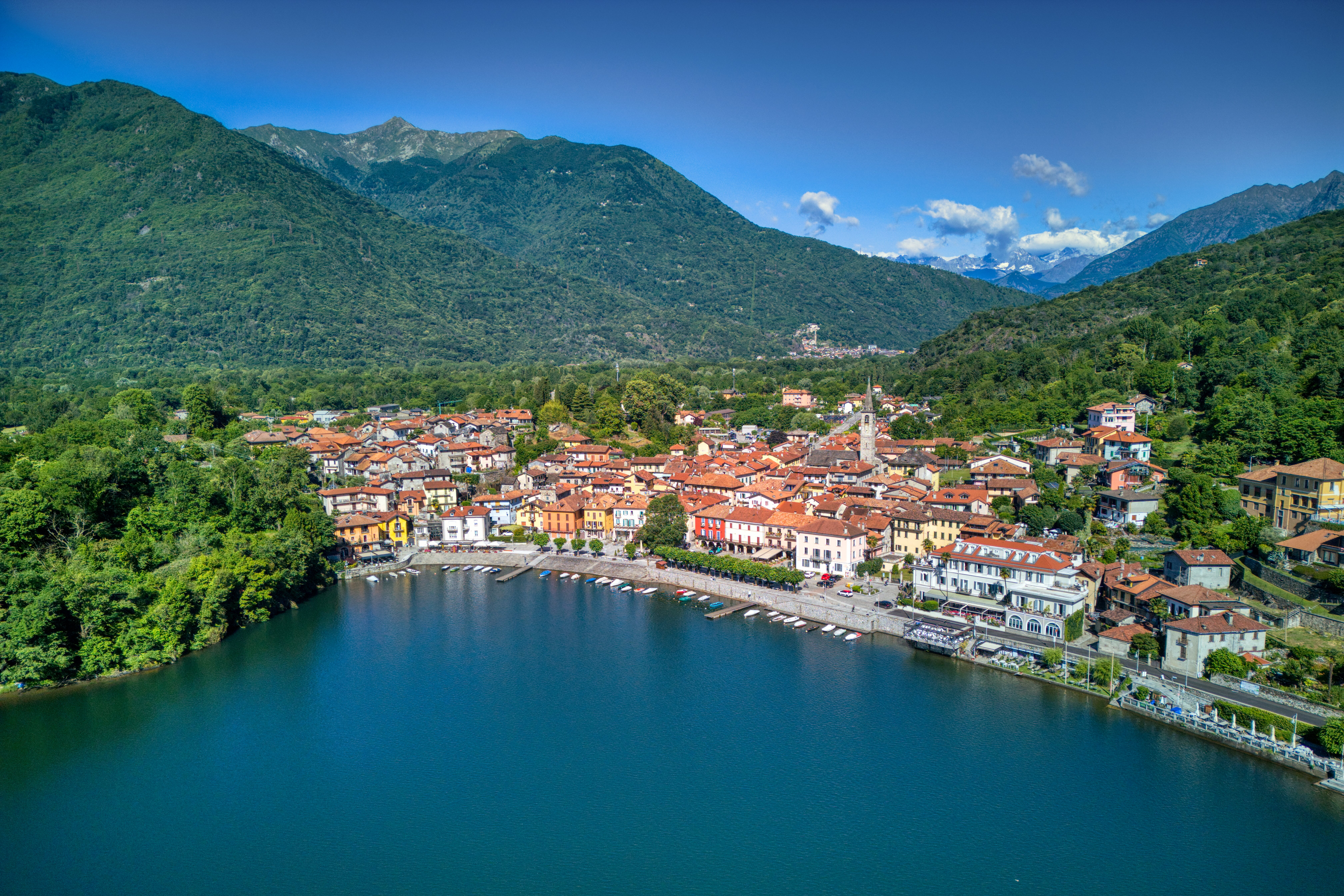
- Lake Mergozzo

- Coat of arms

- Location within Italy Location within Piedmont
- Coordinates: 45°58′N 8°26′E
- Country: Italy
- Region: Piedmont
- Province: Verbano-Cusio-Ossola (VB)
- Frazioni: Albo, Bettola, Bracchio, Candoglia, Montorfano, Nibbio

Government
  - Mayor: Paolo Tognetti

Area
  - Total: 27.4 km^{2} (10.6 sq mi)
- Elevation: 196 m (643 ft)

Population (30 September 2009)
  - Total: 2,135
  - Density: 77.9/km^{2} (202/sq mi)
- Demonym: Mergozzesi
- Time zone: UTC+1 (CET)
  - Summer (DST): UTC+2 (CEST)
- Postal code: 28802
- Dialing code: 0323
- Patron saint: Holy Mary
- Saint day: 15 August (Assumption of-)
- Website: Official website

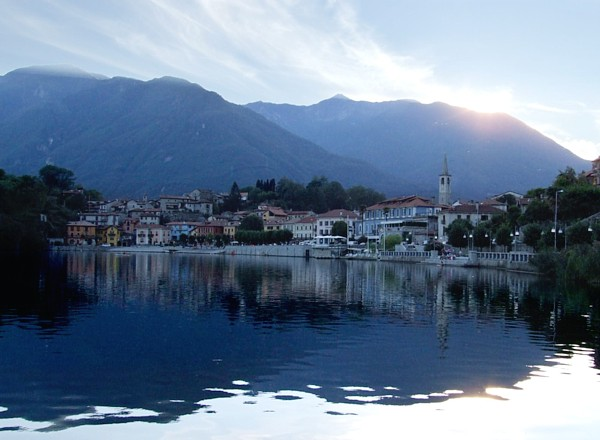
The sun sets over Mergozzo

Mergozzo (Margözz in Ossolano dialect) is a comune (municipality) in the Province of Verbano-Cusio-Ossola in the Italian region Piedmont, located about 120 kilometres (75 mi) northeast of Turin and about 9 kilometres (6 mi) northwest of Verbania.

Mergozzo borders the following municipalities: Gravellona Toce, Ornavasso, Premosello-Chiovenda, San Bernardino Verbano, Verbania.

== Economy ==
Tourism based on the attractions of Lake Mergozzo, nearly all of which falls within the territory of the comune, forms the principal basis of the local economy. Next in importance is the quarrying and working of stone. The pink marble of Candoglia, which was employed in building the Duomo di Milano from the 14th century on, is still extracted; the stone of Montorfano is exported throughout the world.

The agricultural sector is also active.

== Sport ==
In the area of the village Nibbio, in the municipality of Mergozzo there is a rock climbing area called La Panoramica.

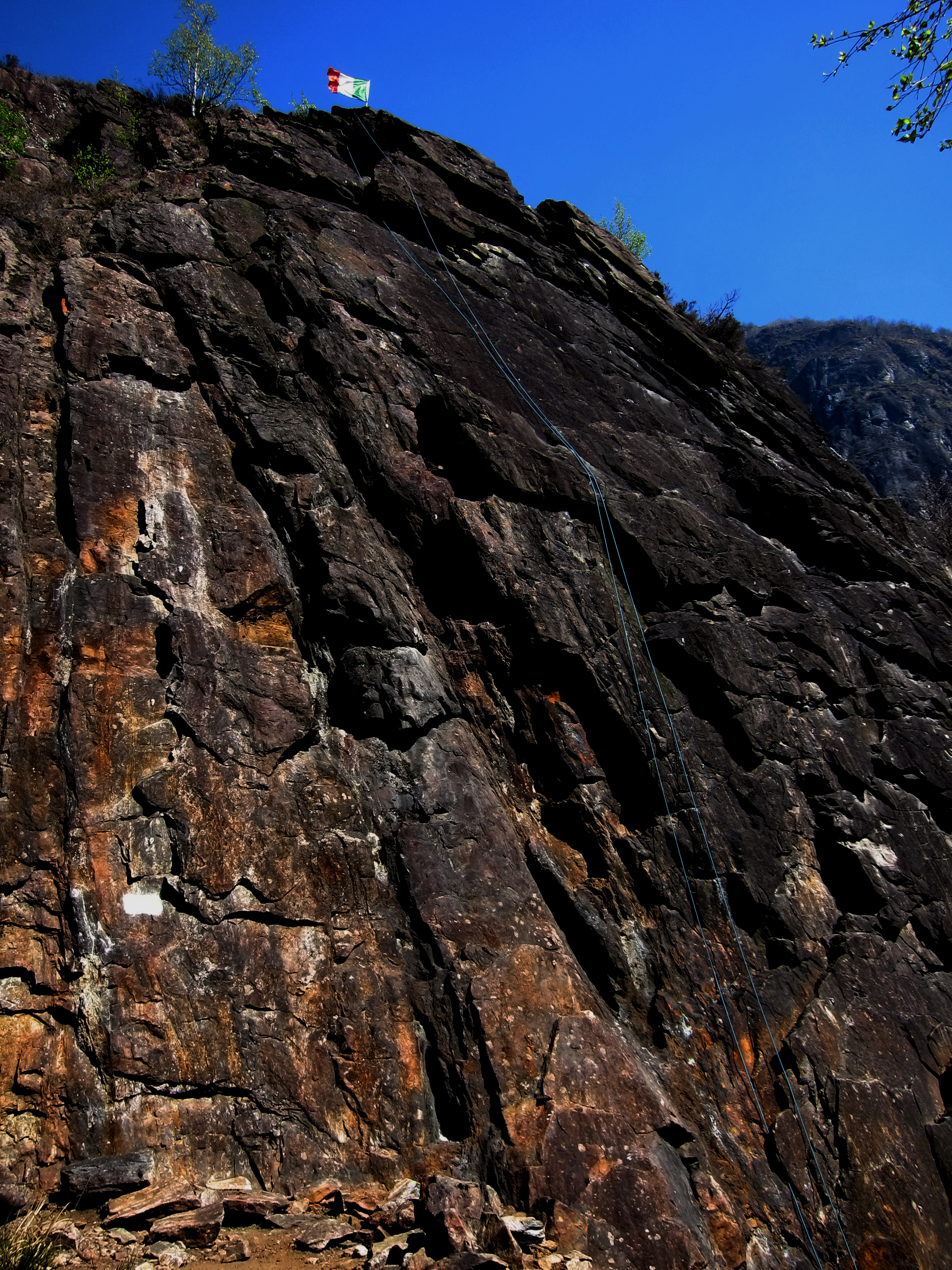
Rock climbing area in Nibbio
