= Ornavasso =

- Comune
- Comune di Ornavasso
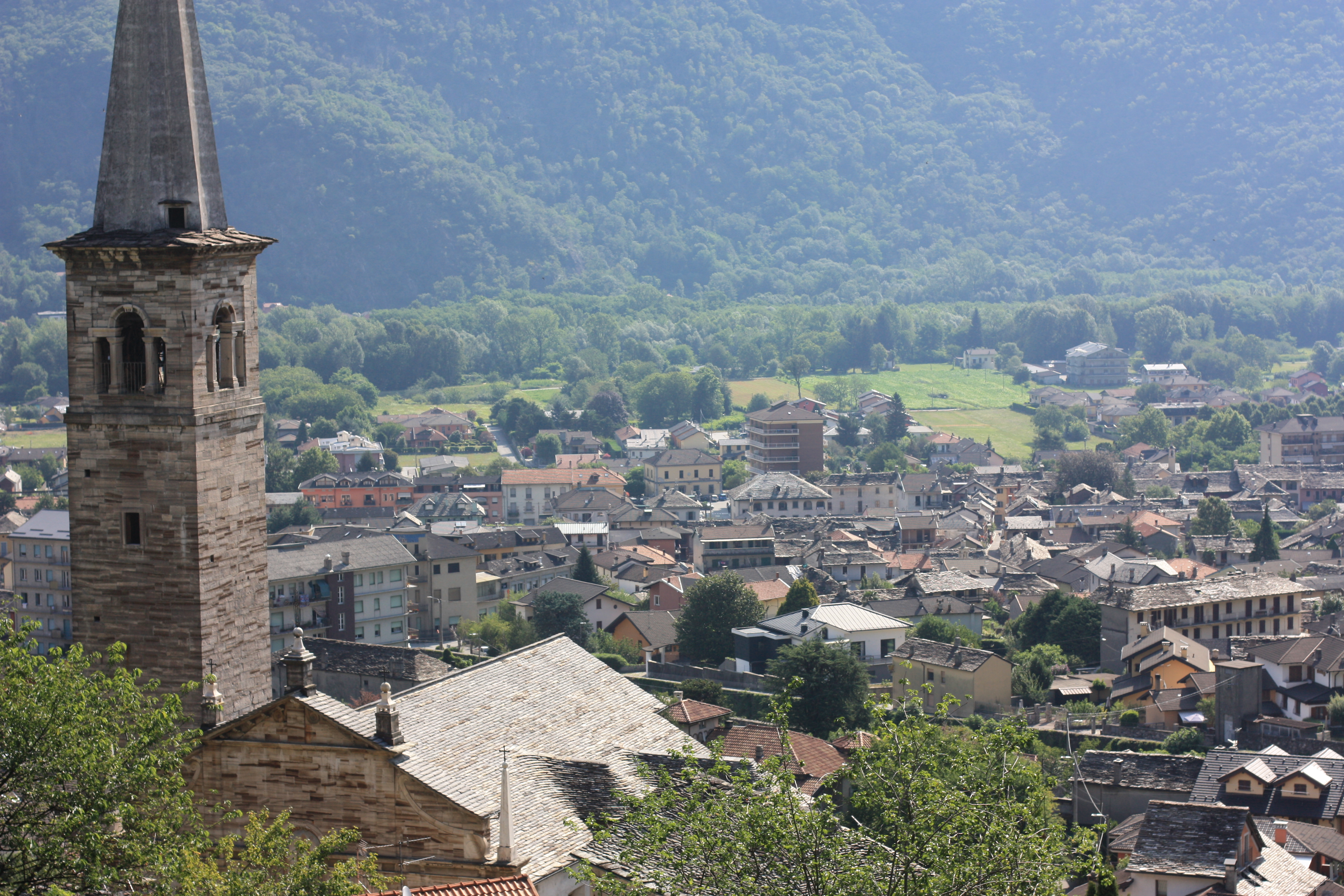
- Panoramic view

- Coat of arms

- Location within Italy Location within Piedmont
- Coordinates: 45°58′N 8°24′E
- Country: Italy
- Region: Piedmont
- Province: Verbano-Cusio-Ossola (VB)
- Frazioni: Migiandone

Government
  - Mayor: Filippo Cigala Fulgosi

Area
  - Total: 25.9 km^{2} (10.0 sq mi)
- Elevation: 215 m (705 ft)

Population (31 December 2021)
  - Total: 3,334
  - Density: 129/km^{2} (333/sq mi)
- Demonym(s): Ornavassesi, Migiandonesi
- Time zone: UTC+1 (CET)
  - Summer (DST): UTC+2 (CEST)
- Postal code: 28027
- Dialing code: 0323
- Website: Official website

Ornavasso (Ossolano: Urnavass, Walser German: Urnafasch) is a comune (municipality) in the Province of Verbano-Cusio-Ossola in the Italian region Piedmont, located about 110 kilometres (68 mi) northeast of Turin and about 11 kilometres (7 mi) northwest of Verbania.

== Overview ==
Ornavasso borders the following municipalities: Anzola d'Ossola, Gravellona Toce, Mergozzo, Premosello Chiovenda. In the area there are two necropolises of the Lepontii-Celtic culture, dating to 2nd century BC – 1st century AD. From the 14th century to the late 19th century, Ornavasso and its frazione of Migiandone were a language island of Walser German, due to the presence of immigrants from the Simplon area. Traces of the German culture persist in the local dialect and the Carnival tradition.

During World War II, Ornavasso was the base of the Valtoce Partisan Division.

== Twin towns ==
- Naters, Switzerland
