= Toce =

River in Piedmont, Italy

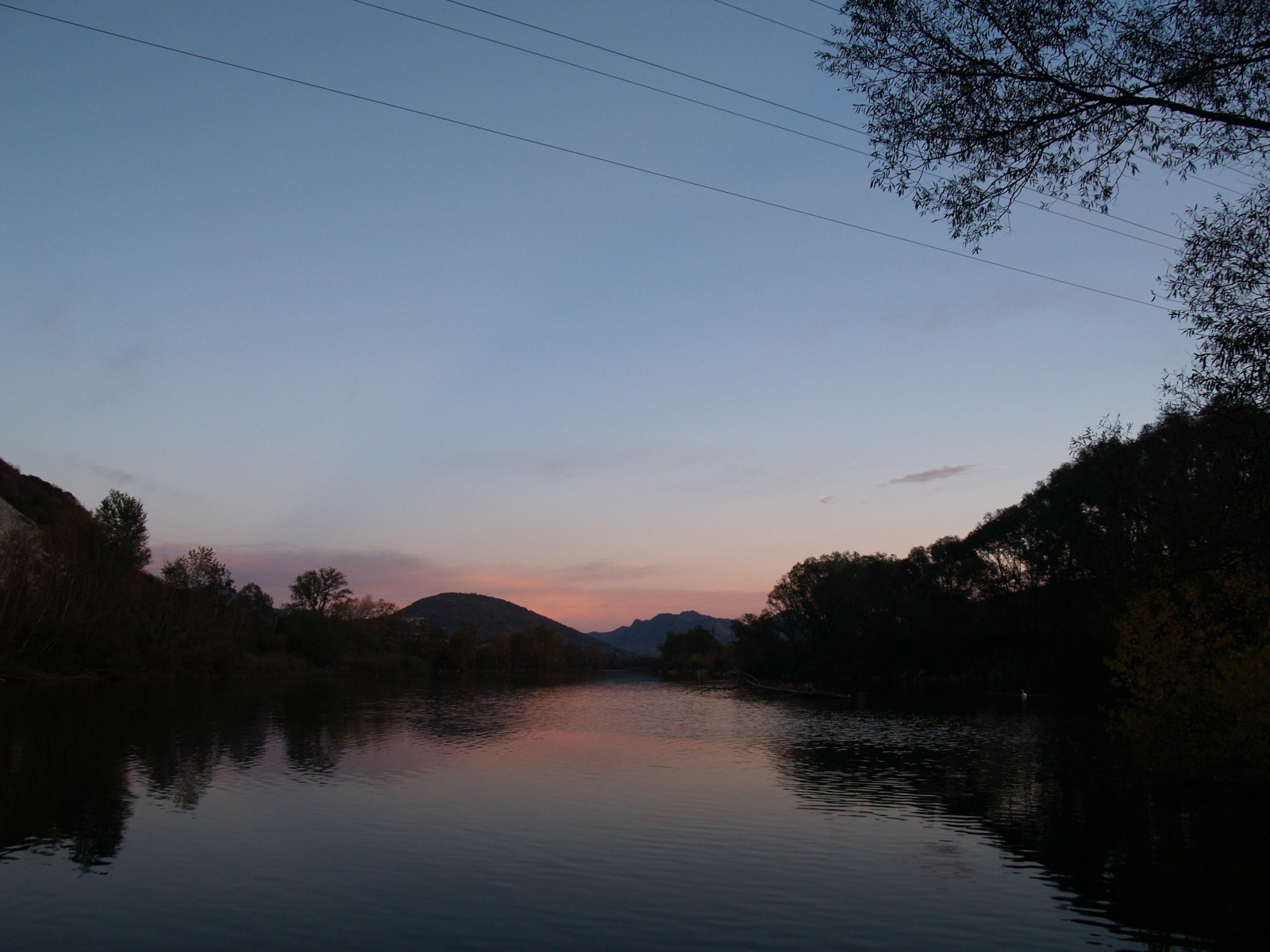
- The river at its confluence with the Strona

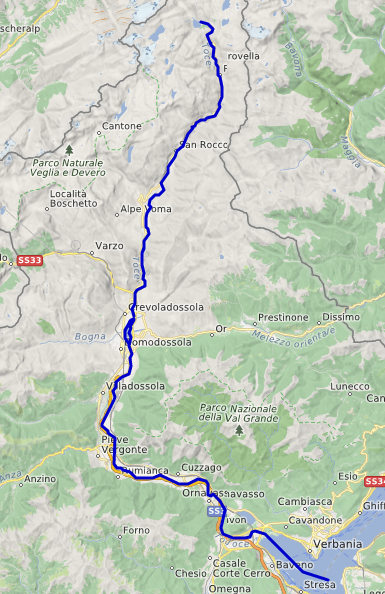
- Course of the Toce
- Native name: Toss (Lombard); Riiss (Walser)

Location
- Country: Italy, Switzerland

Physical characteristics
- Source
  - location: Riale di Formazza
- Mouth: Lake Maggiore
  - coordinates: 45°56′11″N 8°29′38″E
- Length: 83.6 km (51.9 mi)
- Discharge
  - average: 69.9 m^{3}/s (2,470 cu ft/s)

Basin features
- Progression: Lake Maggiore→ Ticino→ Po→ Adriatic Sea

The Toce (Italian pronunciation: [ˈtoːtʃe, ˈtɔːtʃe]; Lombard: Toss; Walser: Riiss) is a river in Piedmont, Italy, which stretches the length of the Val d'Ossola from the Swiss border to Lake Maggiore into which it debouches near Fondotoce in the commune of Verbania. The river is 83.6 kilometres (51.9 mi) long and is formed in the upper Val Formazza by the confluence of a number of torrents in the plain of Riale.

== Geography ==
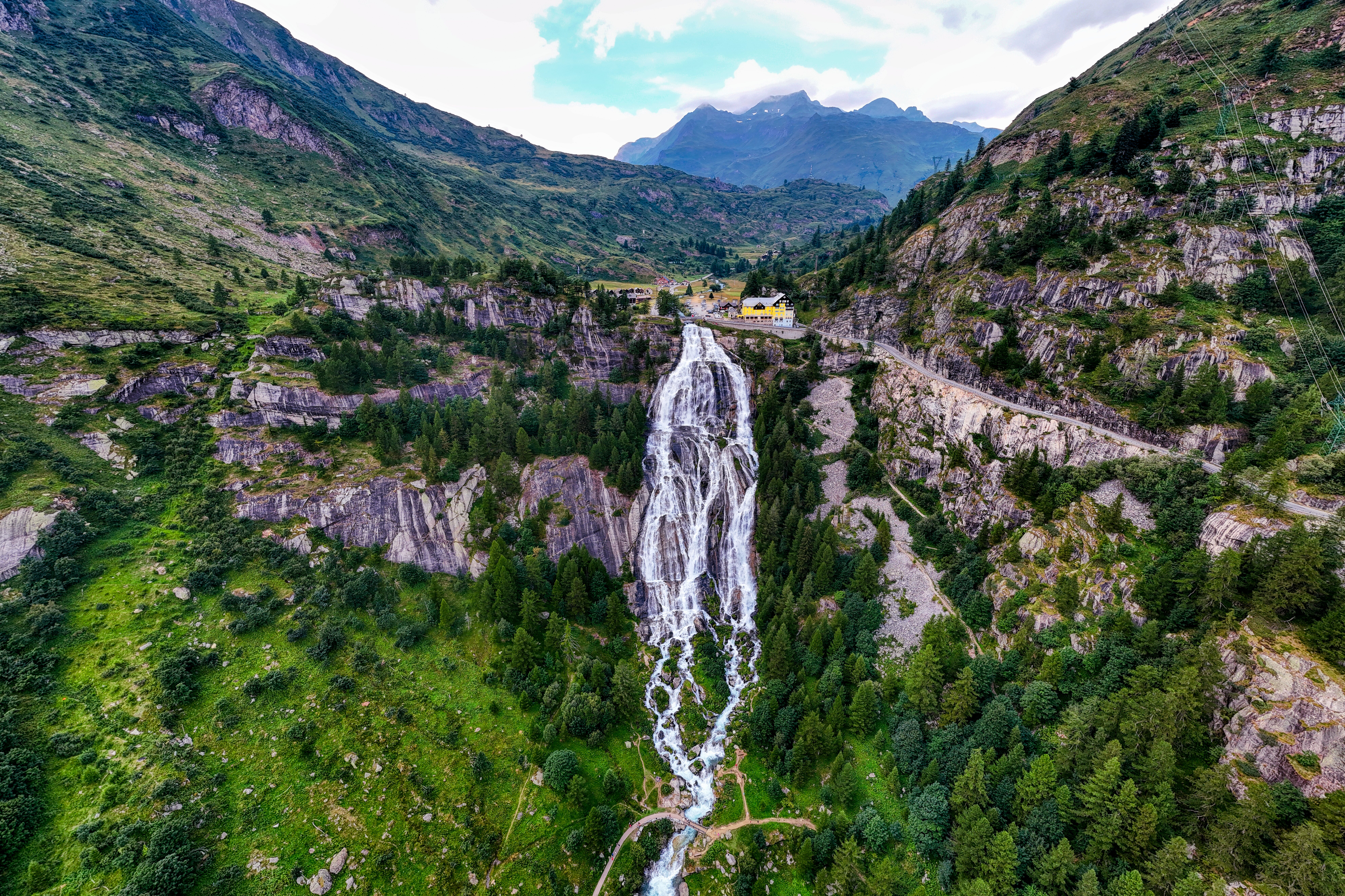
The waterfall near La Frua

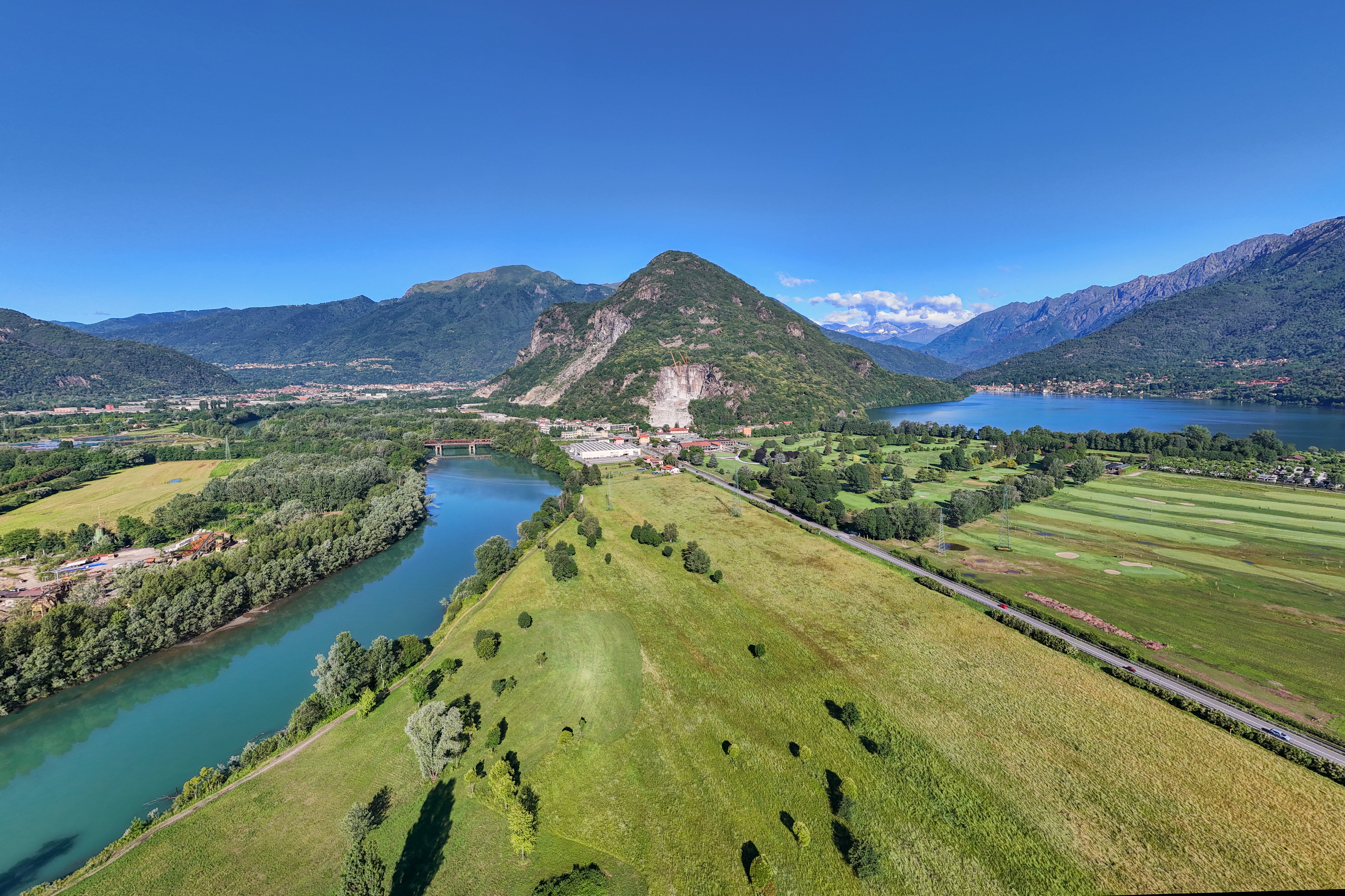
The Toce skirts Lago di Mergozzo on its way to Lago Maggiore.

The source of one of these, the Gries, is situated on the Italian southern side of the Gries Pass; another forms beneath the Passo di San Giacomo, others flow from little Alpine lakes such as Lago Castel and Lago di Sabbione.

South of La Frua the water of the river plummets 143 metres (469 ft) over the Cascata del Toce into the Formazza Valley, through which it flows before transversing Valle Antigorio after another series of cascades. Near Crevola d'Ossola the river Diveria flows into the Toce. At this point, the valley gets wider and is known as Val d'Ossola. The Toce flows next to the capital of the valley, Domodossola, and then Villadossola and Ornavasso. After a total of 76 kilometres (47 mi) the Toce then flows into Lake Maggiore. The major tributaries are the Diveria, Bogna, Melezzo Occidentale (joining it near Domodossola), Ovesca, Anza (near Piedimulera), and the Strona (near Gravellona Toce).

== History ==
In ancient times the Toce river was called Athisone or Atisone, whence the current name is derived. Old alternative forms in Italian include Toccia and Tosa.

== Notes ==
Media related to Toce at Wikimedia Commons
