= Diveria =

River in Switzerland

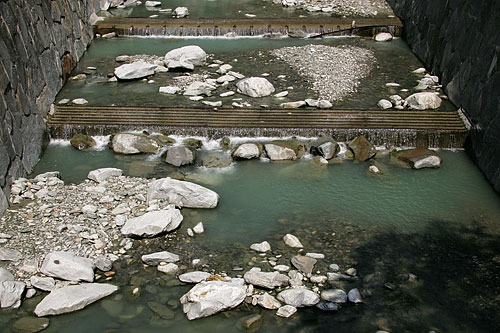

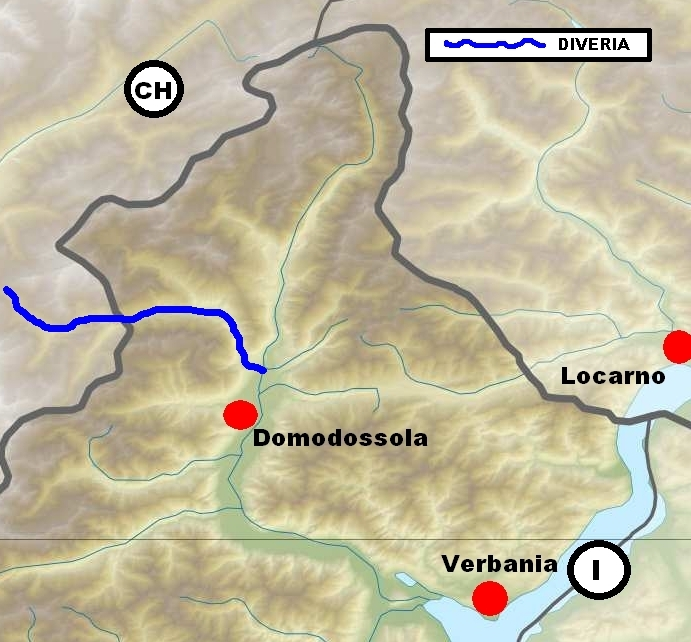

Location
- Country: Switzerland, Italy

Physical characteristics
- Source
  - location: near Simplon Pass
  - coordinates: 46.2449°N 8.0403°E
  - elevation: 2,005 m (6,578 ft)
- Mouth: Toce
  - coordinates: 46.1469°N 8.3095°E
- Discharge
  - average: 0.78 m^{3}/s (28 cu ft/s) at Klussmatten

Basin features
- Progression: Toce→ Lake Maggiore→ Ticino→ Po→ Adriatic Sea

The Diveria (Walliser German: Churumm Bach; German: KrummBach) is an Alpine river which flows through Switzerland (Canton Valais) and Italy (Province of Verbano Cusio Ossola). It is a tributary of the Toce and therefore, via Lake Maggiore and the Ticino, of the Po. The valley crossed by the Diveria, the Val Divedro, is the only one in the Valais to form part of the Po basin rather than that of the Rhône.

== Course ==
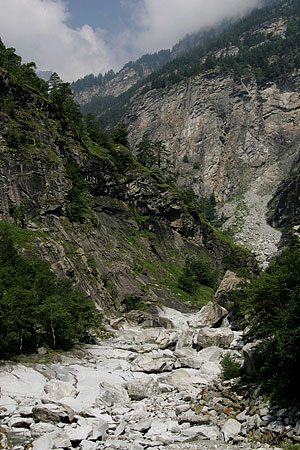
The Gondo gorge

From its source at an elevation of 2,005 metres (6,578 ft) in Swiss territory near the Simplon Pass it flows through the hamlet Egga to the village of Simplon. From here it follows a south-easterly course through the Gondo gorge to the hamlet of Gondo in the municipality of Zwischbergen. Turning to the east it enters Italy and passes the villages of Paglino, Iselle di Trasquera, Bertonio and Varzo; turning south it passes Ricegno, Mognata, Campeglia and Crevoladossola where it enters the Toce.
