= Gravellona Toce =

- Comune
- Comune di Gravellona Toce
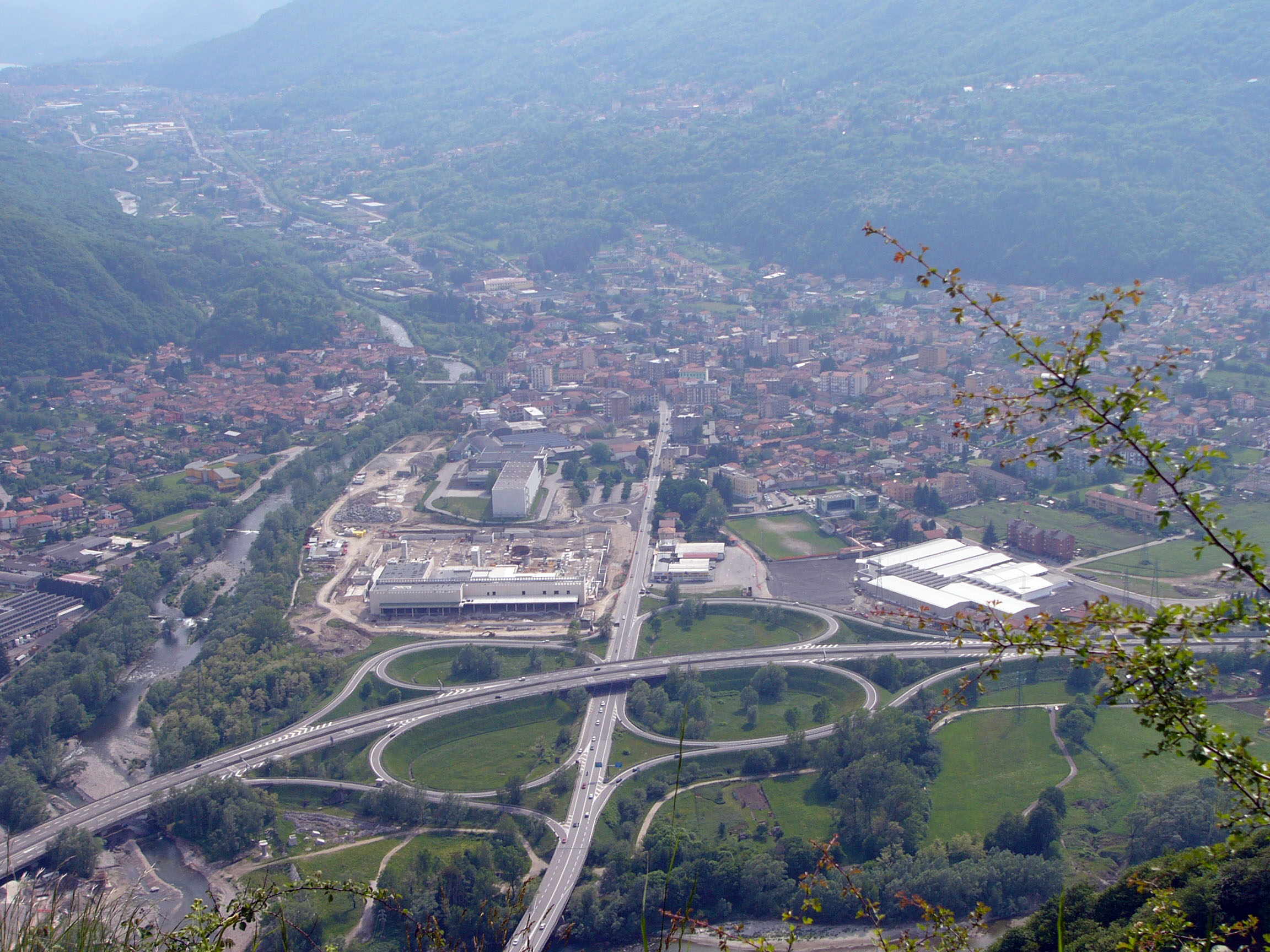

- Coat of arms

- Location within Italy Location within Piedmont
- Coordinates: 45°56′N 8°26′E
- Country: Italy
- Region: Piedmont
- Province: Verbano-Cusio-Ossola (VB)
- Frazioni: Granerolo, Pedemonte

Government
  - Mayor: Giovanni Morandi

Area
  - Total: 14.7 km^{2} (5.7 sq mi)
- Elevation: 211 m (692 ft)

Population (1 January 2010)
  - Total: 7,838
  - Density: 533/km^{2} (1,380/sq mi)
- Demonym: Gravellonesi
- Time zone: UTC+1 (CET)
  - Summer (DST): UTC+2 (CEST)
- Postal code: 28883
- Dialing code: 0323
- Patron saint: St. Peter
- Saint day: June 29
- Website: Official website

Gravellona Toce (Italian pronunciation: [ɡravelˈloːna ˈtoːtʃe]) is a comune (municipality) in the Province of Verbano-Cusio-Ossola in the Italian region Piedmont, located about 110 kilometres (68 mi) northeast of Turin and about 8 kilometres (5 mi) west of Verbania.

== Main sights ==
- Gallo-Roman necropolis
- Parish church of St. Peter (12th century)
- Castello del Motto (Castrum Gravallonae): is an ancient human settlement. It is located on a hill (locality Motto) at the slopes of Mottarone, at its feet is located an old agglomeration of houses (locality Baraggia) mainly built in granite, white and pink. In recent years, cleaning works, university studies and a valorization of the site have brought the site to view in its splendor
- Romanesque church of St. Maurice (10th century): it is the oldest, most important and significant monument in Gravellona, its existence is documented from the X century. It is a Romanesque building made of local stone blocks, partly obtained from a nearby Roman tower. The walls, externally decorated by lombard band, have large rectangular windows in place of the original single-fronted. Inside, the fifteenth-century groin vaults of the roof of the single nave have recently been replaced with exposed trusses; fifteenth-century frescoes have emerged from the lime layer that concealed them during the restoration carried out by Mesturino in 1925. On the northern side stands the bell tower, separate but directly connected to the church. The lower part, seems to date back to the last decades of the eleventh century; the bell tower, with the octagonal dome is an addition from the nineteenth century.
- Villa Capra (XVIII sec.): originally from the end of 1700, it was the home of senator Francesco Albertini in the second half of the twentieth century. The property was the home of the Cav. Giovanni Capra fu Leopoldo, deputy to the Subalpine Parliament during the VI Legislature of the Kingdom of Sardinia. The villa, currently closed to the public due to important structural problems, is awaiting an important restoration work. A part of the original park of the villa has been transformed into a public park.
- Church of Santa Maria Al Bosco (XV secolo)
- Church of "Madonna Dell'Occhio" (1630)
