= Breithorn (Simplon) =

Mountain in Switzerland

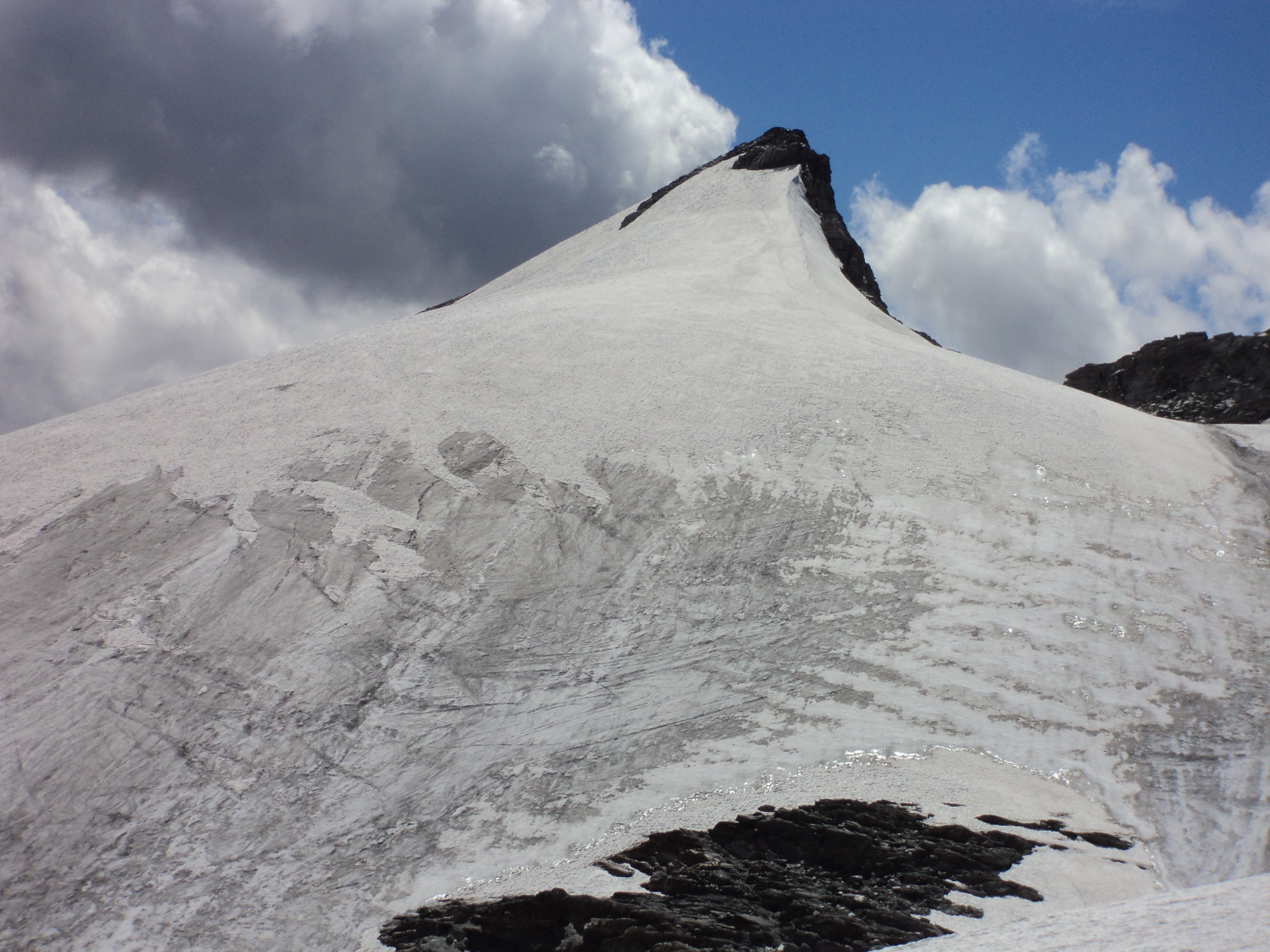
- View from the Breithornpass (north side)

Highest point
- Elevation: 3,437 m (11,276 ft)
- Prominence: 90 m (300 ft)
- Parent peak: Monte Leone
- Coordinates: 46°14′19″N 8°5′2″E

Naming
- Native name: Breithorn (German)
- English translation: Broad Horn

Geography
- Location within Switzerland
- Country: Switzerland
- Canton: Valais
- Parent range: Lepontine Alps
- Topo map: Swisstopo topographic maps

The Breithorn (Swiss Standard German pronunciation: [ˈbraɪthɔrn]) is a mountain of the Swiss Lepontine Alps, overlooking Simplon in the canton of Valais. It is part of the Monte Leone massif.

== Climbing route ==
Breithorn is one of several peaks that can be climbed directly from the Simplon Pass. The other peaks are Wasenhorn, Hubschhorn, and Monte Leone. The route starts from the Simplon Hospiz and you will need glacier equipment for this mountain, crampons are compulsory. Plan around 5 hours from the road to the summit. This peak can be climbed in combination with Monte Leone.

== Accommodation, huts and shelters ==
- Simplon Hospiz.
- Monte Leone Hut.
- Bivacco Farello on the Chaltwasser Pass.

== Access road ==
The only access is the road to the Simplon Pass from Brig on the Swiss side and from Domodossola from the Italian side.
