= Lake Hopschu =

Lake in Switzerland

- Hopschusee (German)
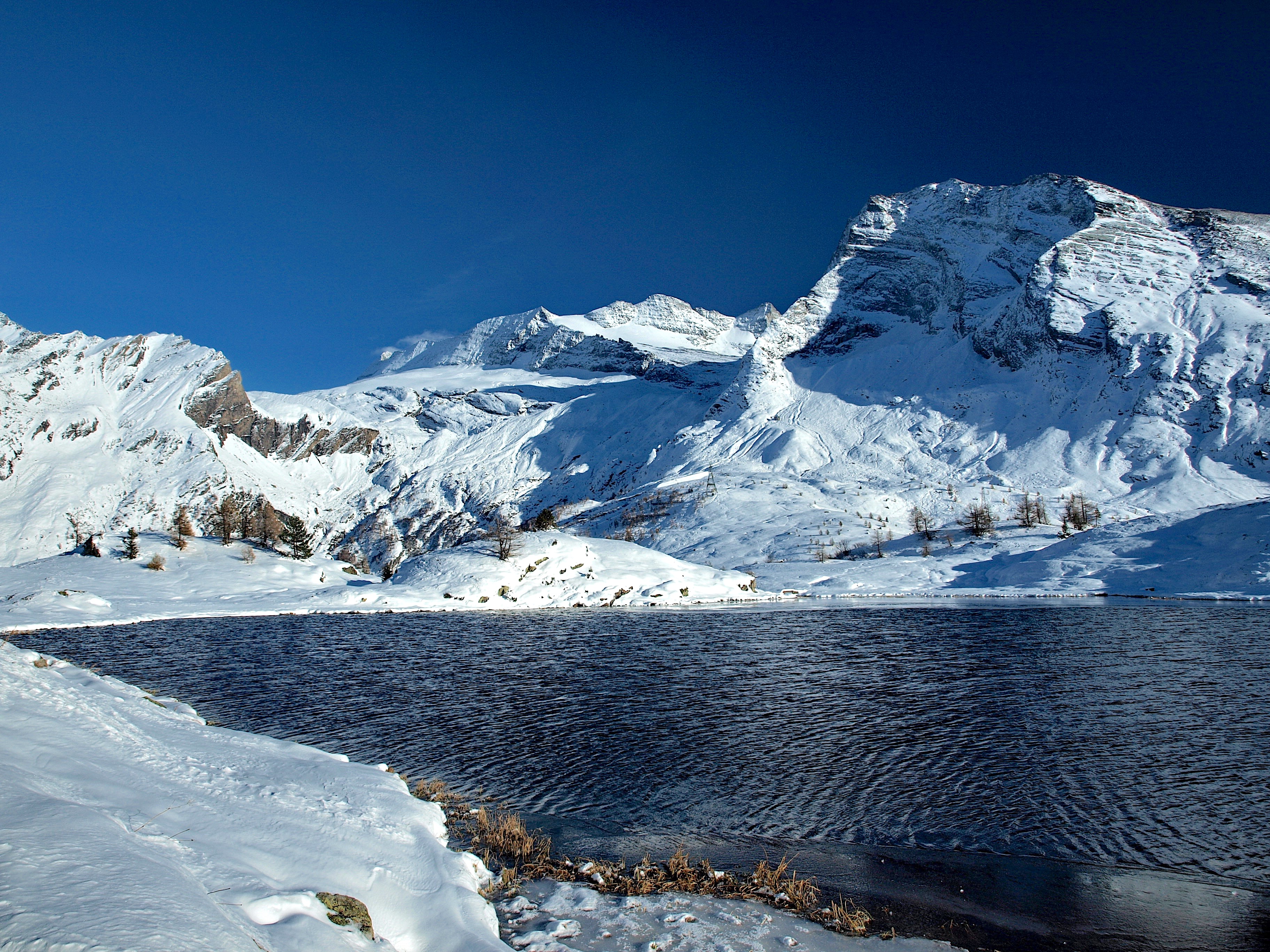
- Lake Hopschu at 2018 m with Mount Hübschhorn

- Location within Canton of Valais Location within Switzerland Location within Alps
- Interactive map of Lake Hopschu
- Location: Simplon Pass, Valais
- Coordinates: 46°15′08.7″N 008°01′23.8″E
- Primary outflows: Hpschu → Taferna → Saltina → Rhône → Mediterranean Sea
- Basin countries: Switzerland
- Surface area: 1.5 ha (3.7 acres)
- Surface elevation: 2,018 m (6,621 ft)

Lake Hopschu (German: Hopschusee) is a lake near Simplon Pass in the canton of Valais, Switzerland. Lake Hopschu is located in the area of the municipality of Simplon under the eastern flank of the Tochuhorn and directly on the watershed between the Rhone and the Po. Lake Hopschu is situated in a protected high bog.

Half a kilometer south-east of the lake, the symbol of the Simplon is the Stone Eagle monument, which was erected during World War II as a symbol for border protection and to commemorate active service by Mountain Brigade 11. The settlement Alp Hopsche is 140 meters southwest of Lake Hopschu. The buildings on the alp are now mainly used as holiday homes in summer.

== Photos ==
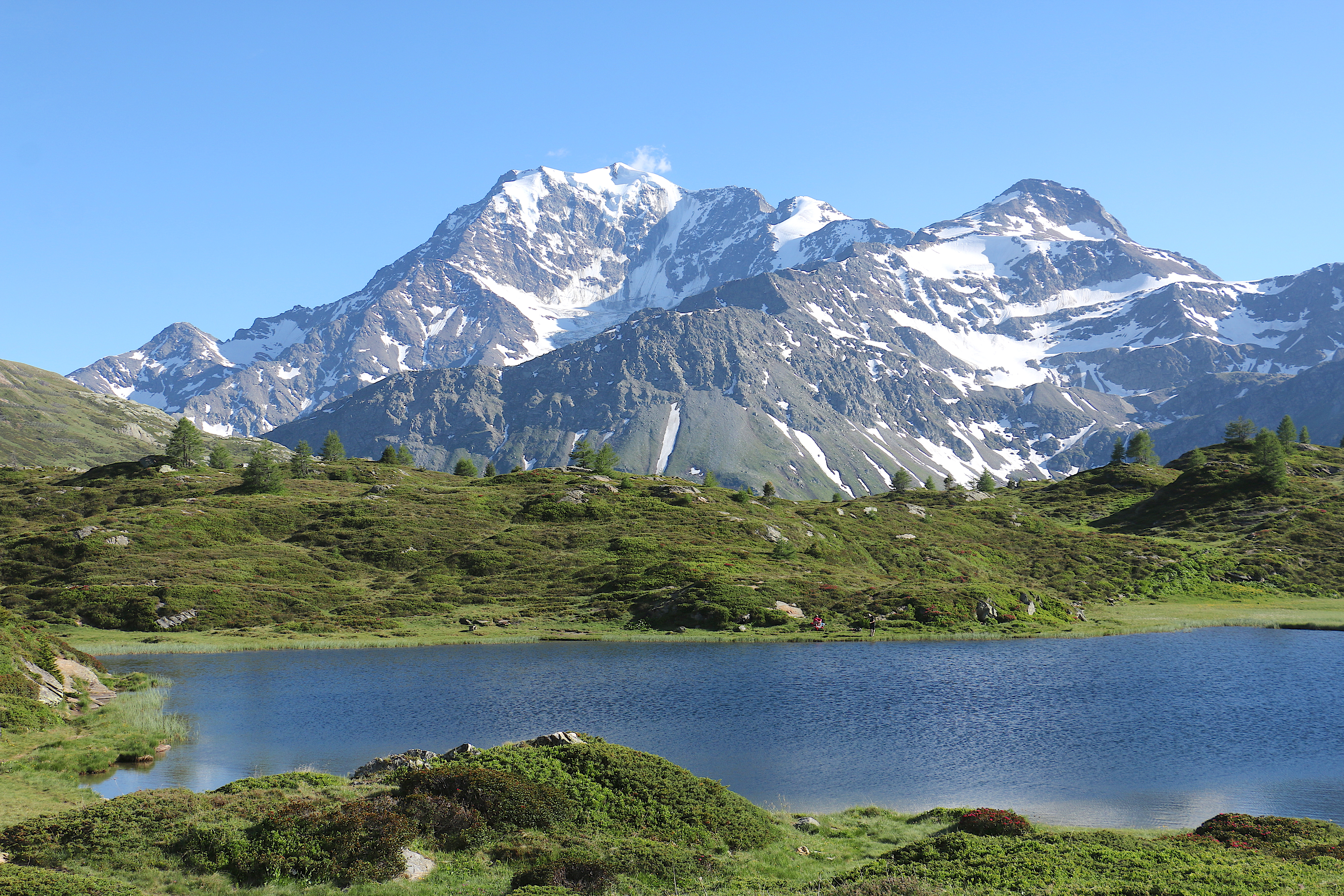
Lake Hopschu and Mount Fletschhorn in summer time.

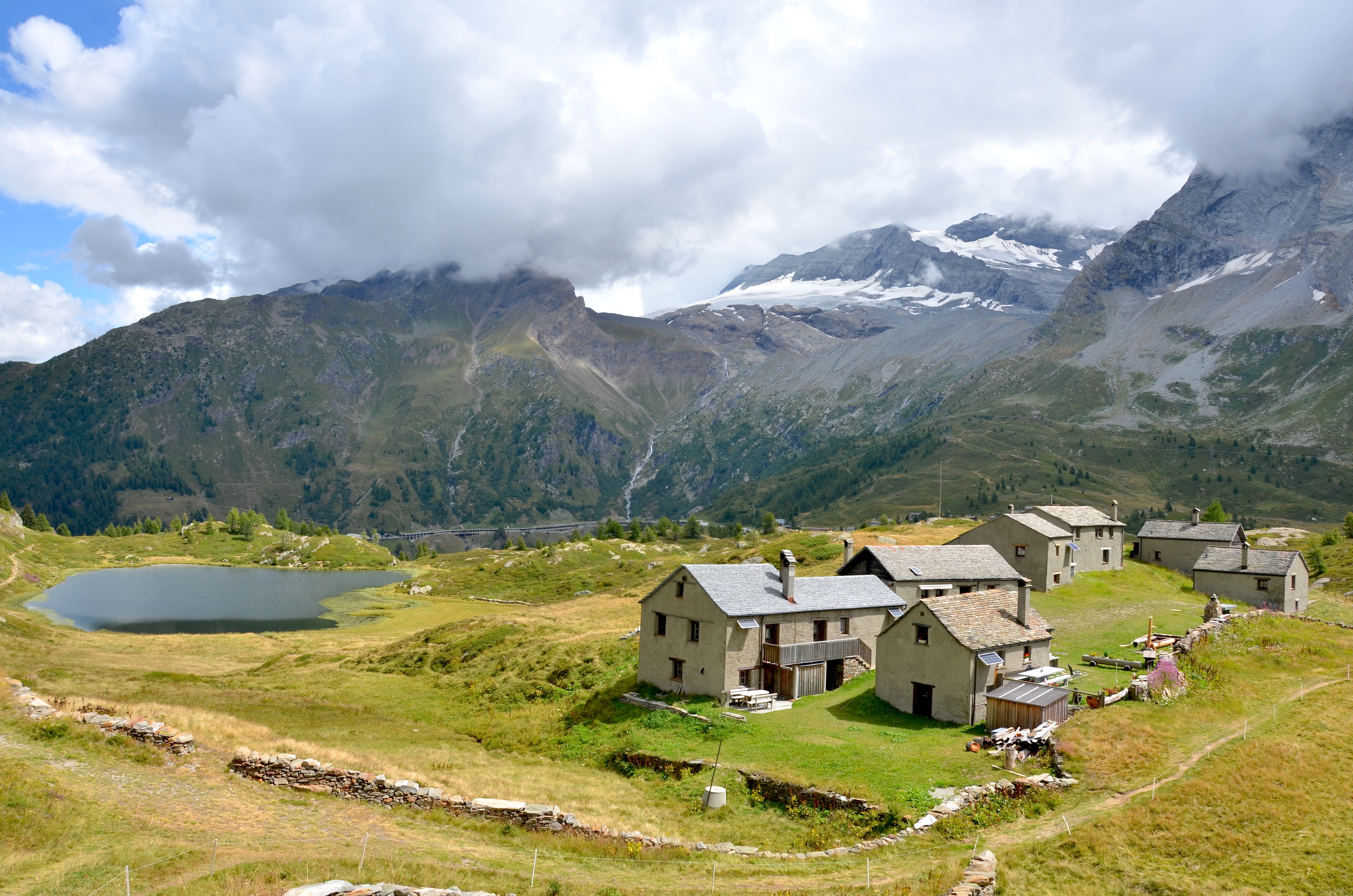
Lake Hopschu and settlement Alp Hopsche
