= Kaltwasser Pass =

Mountain pass in Switzerland and Italy

- Bocchetta d'Aurona
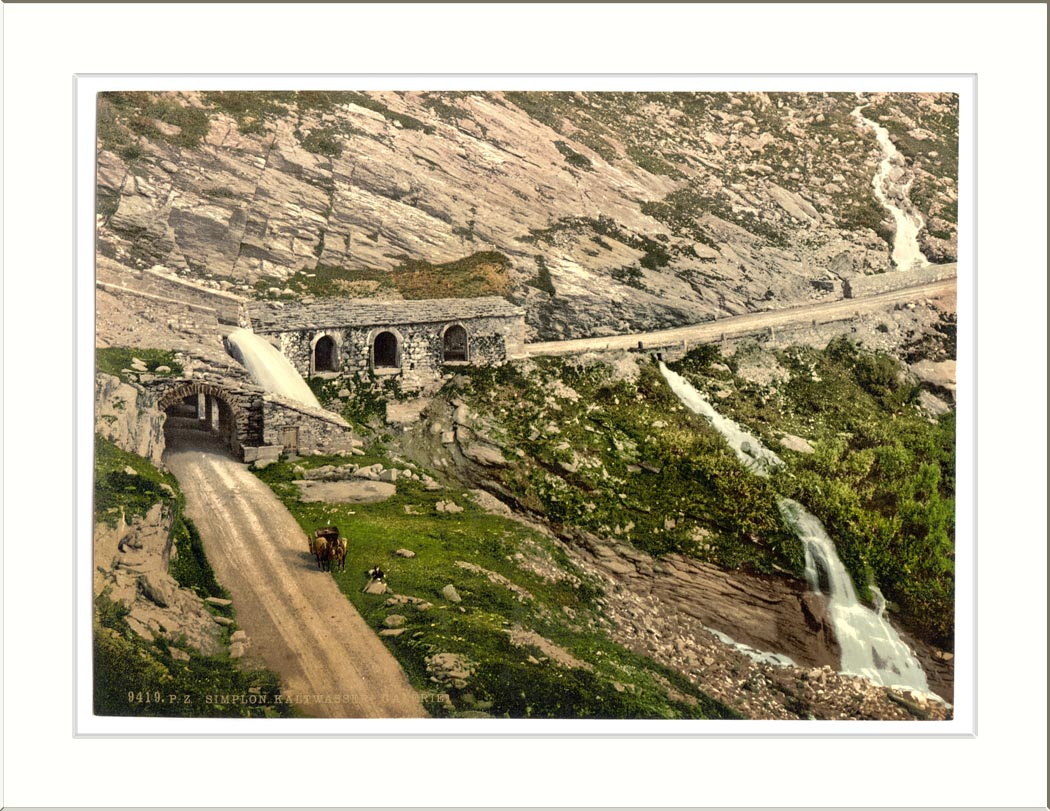
- The Kaltwasser Gallerie at the Simplon Pass

- Location within Alps
- Elevation: 2,805 metres (9,203 ft)
- Traversed by: Trail

Third Approach
- Location: Brig-Glis, Switzerland; Varzo, Italy
- Range: Lepontine Alps
- Coordinates: 46°15′31″N 8°04′55″E

The Kaltwasser Pass (German: Kaltwasserpass or Chaltwasserpass, Italian: Bocchetta d'Aurona) is an Alpine pass connecting Switzerland and Italy.

The pass is located between the Wasenhorn or Punta di Terrarossa (3,255 meters [10,679 ft]) and the Monte Leone (3,561 meters [11,683 ft]).

Climbing the pass requires about 5 hours and is generally a fairly easy hike. It runs from the old Simplon Hospice, a Swiss heritage site of national significance, past the Kaltwasser or Aurona glacier to the Italian Alpe di Veglia.
