= Alpe Ciamporino =

Ski resort in Italy

Coordinates: 46°15′38″N 8°11′40″E

Alpe Ciamporino is the name of a ski resort and summer hiking region in the Lepontine Alps, by the Simplon Pass region in Italy. It is located near San Domenico di Varzo village, north of the Piedmont region, by the Swiss border with Wallis canton.

As a winter ski resort, it has a base elevation at 1420 metres altitude, and peaks at 2500 metres. During the summer, Alpe Ciamporino serves as the starting point for alpine hiking and traverse to Alpe Veglia, Alpe Devero and Alpe Solcio.
