= Hübschhorn =

Mountain in Switzerland

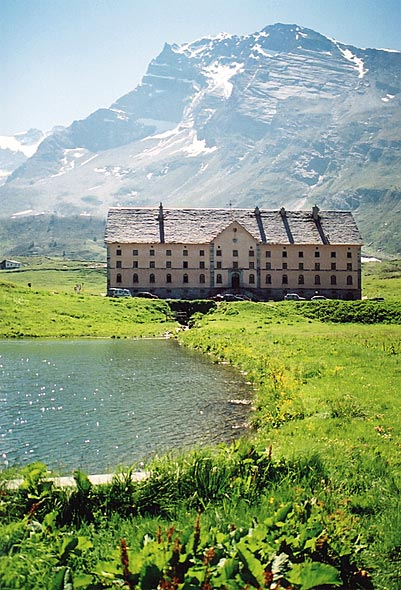
- View from the Simplon Pass (west side)

Highest point
- Elevation: 3,192 m (10,472 ft)
- Prominence: 325 m (1,066 ft)
- Parent peak: Monte Leone
- Listing: Alpine mountains above 3000 m
- Coordinates: 46°14′12.2″N 8°3′18.2″E

Geography
- Location within Switzerland
- Location: Valais, Switzerland
- Parent range: Lepontine Alps

The Hübschhorn is a mountain of the Lepontine Alps, overlooking the Simplon Pass in the canton of Valais. It belongs to the Monte Leone massif. Its altitude is 3190m/10'460 ft.

== Access roads ==
The car access is both from Italian and Swiss sides by following the road towards the Simplon pass. The closest cities are Domodossola on the Italian side and Brig on the Swiss side. If you need accommodation on the pass, you have Simplon Hospiz (Hospice du Simplon).

== Normal climbing route ==
To climb Hübschhorn you start walking from the road towards a small lake which is directly below the mountain (Rotelsee). From there continue up by following a steep path. You will need around three hours from the road to the summit.

From this point, the complete route to Wasenhorn and the glacier route to Breithorn (Simplon) are visible, as are the views of the Weissmies group in the south-west direction.

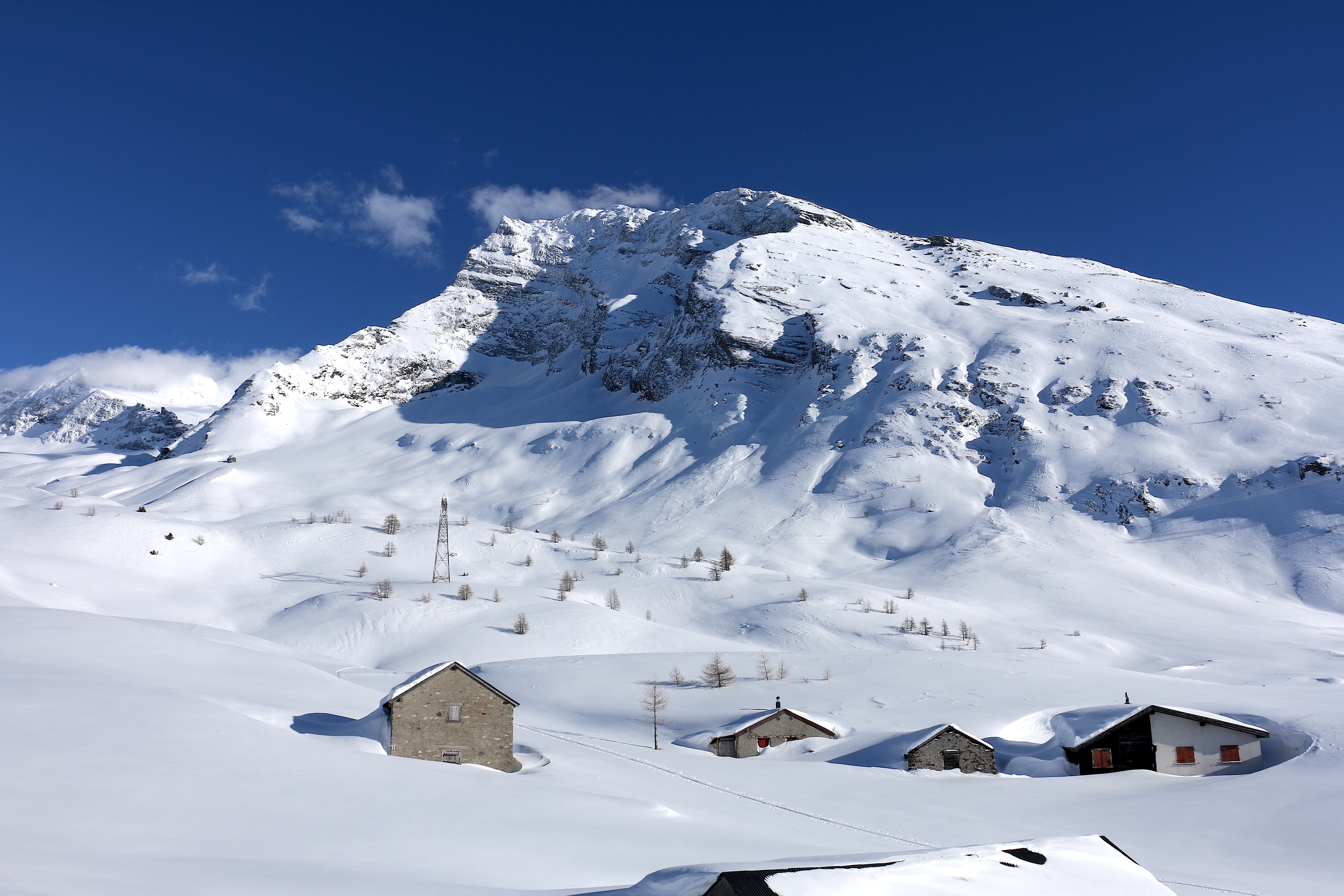
Hübschhorn seen from Simplon Pass (2017)

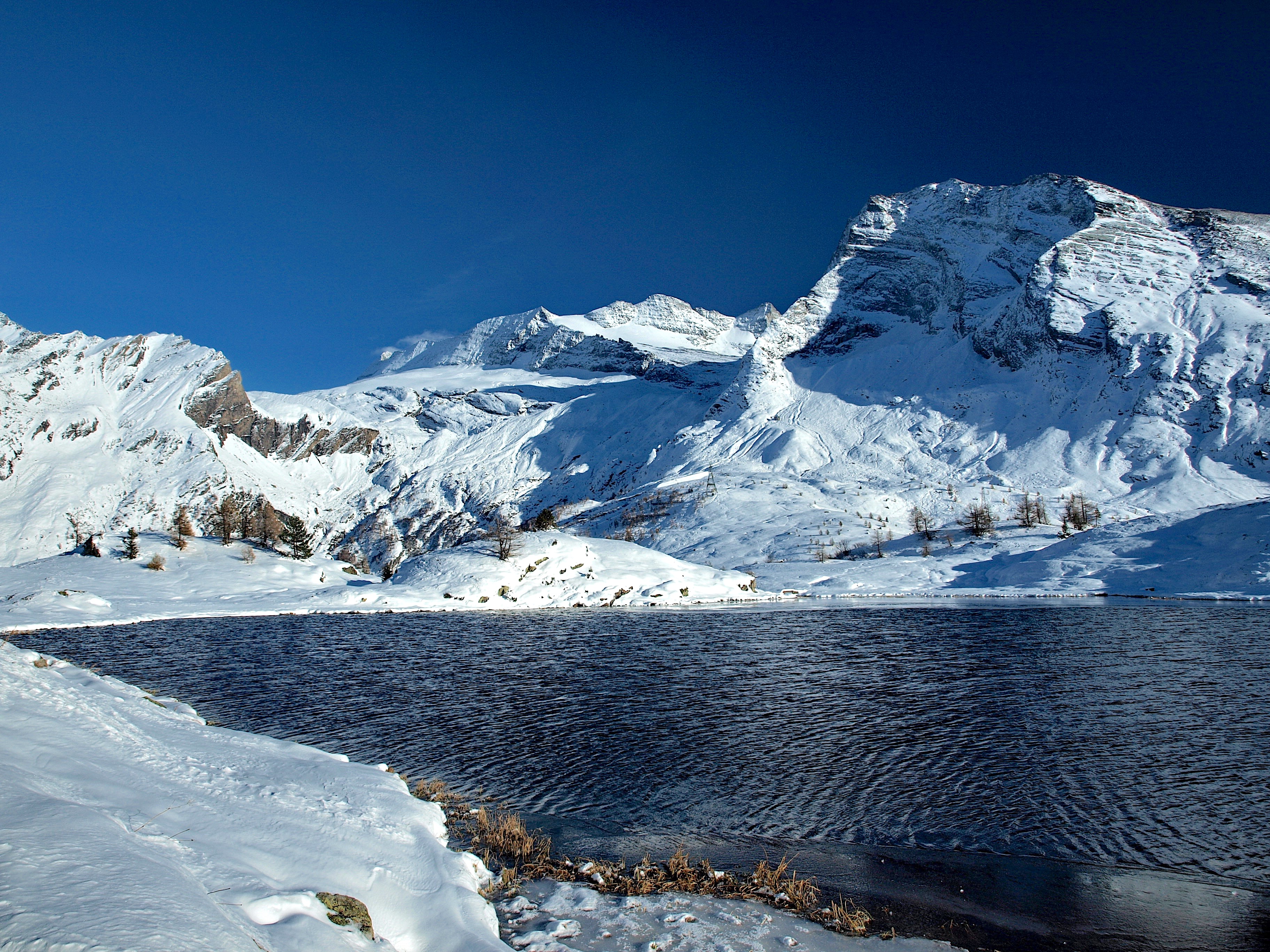
Hübschhorn with Hopschusee
