= Museum of Lacquer Art =

Museum in Münster, Germany

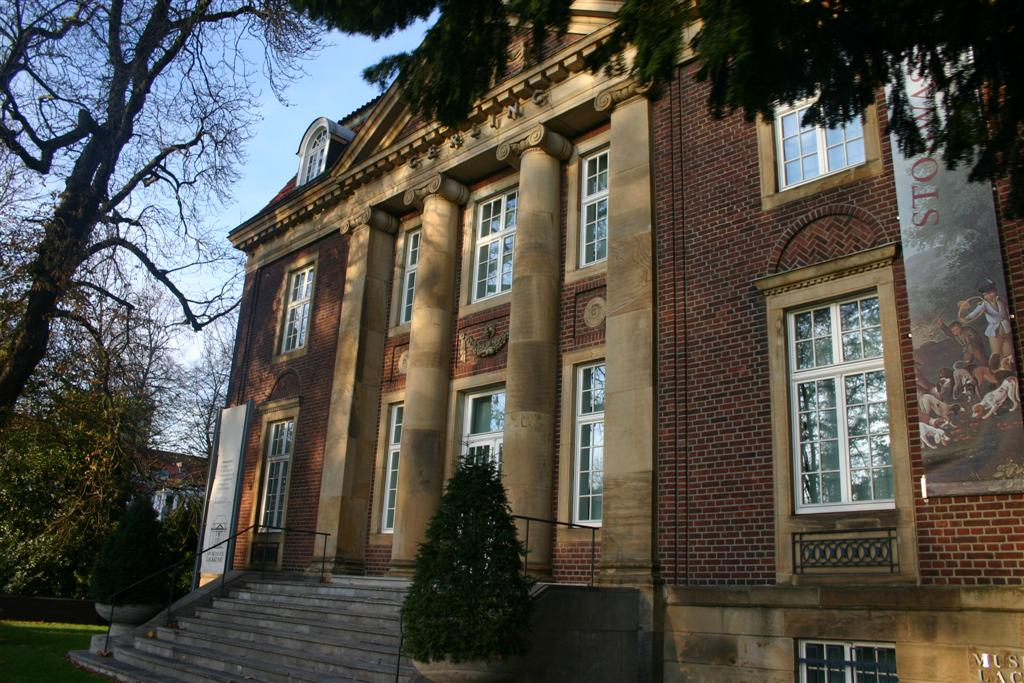
- Location: Germany
- Coordinates: 51°57′28″N 7°37′53″E
- Website: www.museum-fuer-lackkunst.de/en/homepage,%20https://www.museum-fuer-lackkunst.de/de/startseite
- Location of Museum of Lacquer Art

The Museum of Lacquer Art (German:Museum für Lackkunst) is a museum in Münster, Westphalia devoted to the history of lacquer art. It is the only institution of its kind in the world, with a collection of around 1,000 objects from East Asia, Europe, and the Islamic world from more than two thousand years ago. The director is art historian Gudrun Bühl. It is owned by BASF Coatings.

== History ==
The history of the museum goes back to the two collectors Erich Zschocke (1901–1978) and Kurt Herberts (1901–1989). Zschocke belonged to the Cologne paint factory Herbig-Haarhaus in the 1930s. During this time he dealt with the company's own lacquer art . In 1955 he founded the Herbig-Haarhaus- Lacquer Museum, whose holdings included lacquer works "by the last great lacquer master in Japan" Shibala Zesshin (1807–1891). The company was founded in 1922 to continue the Friedrich Haarhaus company, which was founded in 1844 and later oHG Herbig-Haarhaus, which mainly produced paints and varnishes for industry, wholesalers and authorities. It was founded by Robert Friedrich Haarhaus, and his son-in-law Adolf Herbig joined the company in 1871.

When BASF took over the Herbig-Haarhaus lacquer factory in 1968, it also took over the museum. Monika Kopplin, who moved to Münster in 1990 to take over the company's own collection of lacquer art as curator at BASF Lacke und Farben AG, opened the Museum for Lacquer Art in Münster in 1993 and retired in 2019.

Kurt Herberts' collection also began in the 1930s and consisted of objects from historical lacquer art. Most of these valuable objects did not survive the Second World War, so that Herberts began to systematically rebuild his collection from 1949. In 1982, BASF Coatings also took over its collection.

== Collection ==
The oldest objects in the museum come from China and Korea, where decorations were made with the sap of the local lacquer tree as early as the 4th and 5th centuries BC. A representative selection of various decorative techniques that were used in the process is shown. The focus is on red Schnitzlack, lacquer painting on furniture and on mother of pearl work.

The exhibits of Japanese lacquer art ( Urushi) include works of the technique of the scattering pattern, which was developed to perfection in the 9th century, in which gold and silver powder are trickled through small tubes into the still damp paint. The oldest works of European lacquer art, however, date from the end of the 16th century. After the import of Asian lacquer work, the demand for these coveted luxury items rose quickly and the Europeans began to produce their own art objects. Since the sap of the Asian lacquer tree could not be transported to Europe, the works were created from novel lacquer formulas based on oils, resins and binders. While the motifs in the 17th century were similar to those used in Asian lacquer art, new motifs were created from the 18th century. For example, one of the Dresden court painters can be found in the museum Martin Schnell, who is considered to be the founder of Japanese scattering technology in Europe, cabinet cabinet manufactured around 1715, which is considered the most important of lacquer art. Another important piece of European lacquer art is the panorama of the “Great Street of the Simplon”, made around 1820 in the Stobwasser factory, with 24 views of the Swiss Simplon Pass .

The earliest works of Russian lacquer art date from the beginning of the 19th century. Inspired by the ornate ornamentation of the West, it established itself as an independent school that changed from the initial orientation towards European motifs from 1850 to Russian subjects.

In addition, other exhibits of Islamic lacquer art are on display. The oldest of them date back to the late 15th century, when objects decorated with watercolors and shell gold were covered with several layers of clear lacquer. They show the characteristic tendril pattern and flower arrangements as well as the classic Islamic picture theme "rose and nightingale".

== Special exhibitions ==
In addition to the exhibition of the collection, the museum regularly shows special exhibitions on individual epochs of lacquer art. Here it is always possible to make important private collections accessible to the public for the first time.

List of special exhibitions (incomplete):

- 2000: Exhibits from the Baur Collections from Geneva
- March 22 to June 21, 2009: From 1001 Nights, Islamic lacquer art in German museums and libraries
- May 30 to August 29, 2010: Chinese lacquer art, a German private collection
- October 17, 2010 to February 13, 2011: The school of Palech 1923 - 1950, lacquer miniatures of the icon painters a special exhibition
- May 22 to August 21, 2011: Japanese lacquer art for Bavarian princes, the lacquer furniture of the State Mint Collection in Munich
- October 28, 2012 to January 27, 2013: The art of lacquer in Korea - Aesthetics in perfection, selected lacquer work decorated with mother-of-pearl inlays from the Goreyo (918–1392) and Joseon dynasties (1392–1910)
- October 13, 2013 to January 12, 2014: Vernis Martin - French lacquer in the 18th century
- October 25, 2015 to February 7, 2016: Positions in contemporary Korean lacquer art
- November 7, 2019 to February 2, 2020: Men make fashion. Inrō from the collection of the Museum of Lacquer Art
- April 2 to June 14, 2020: Japanese lacquer art at the beginning of the 20th century

== Literature ==
- Lacquer art from East Asia and Europe. Ex oriente lux. The Herbig-Haarhaus lacquer museum. 2nd Edition. BASF Colors and Fibers AG, Cologne 1979.
