= Rotelsee =

Lake in Valais, Switzerland

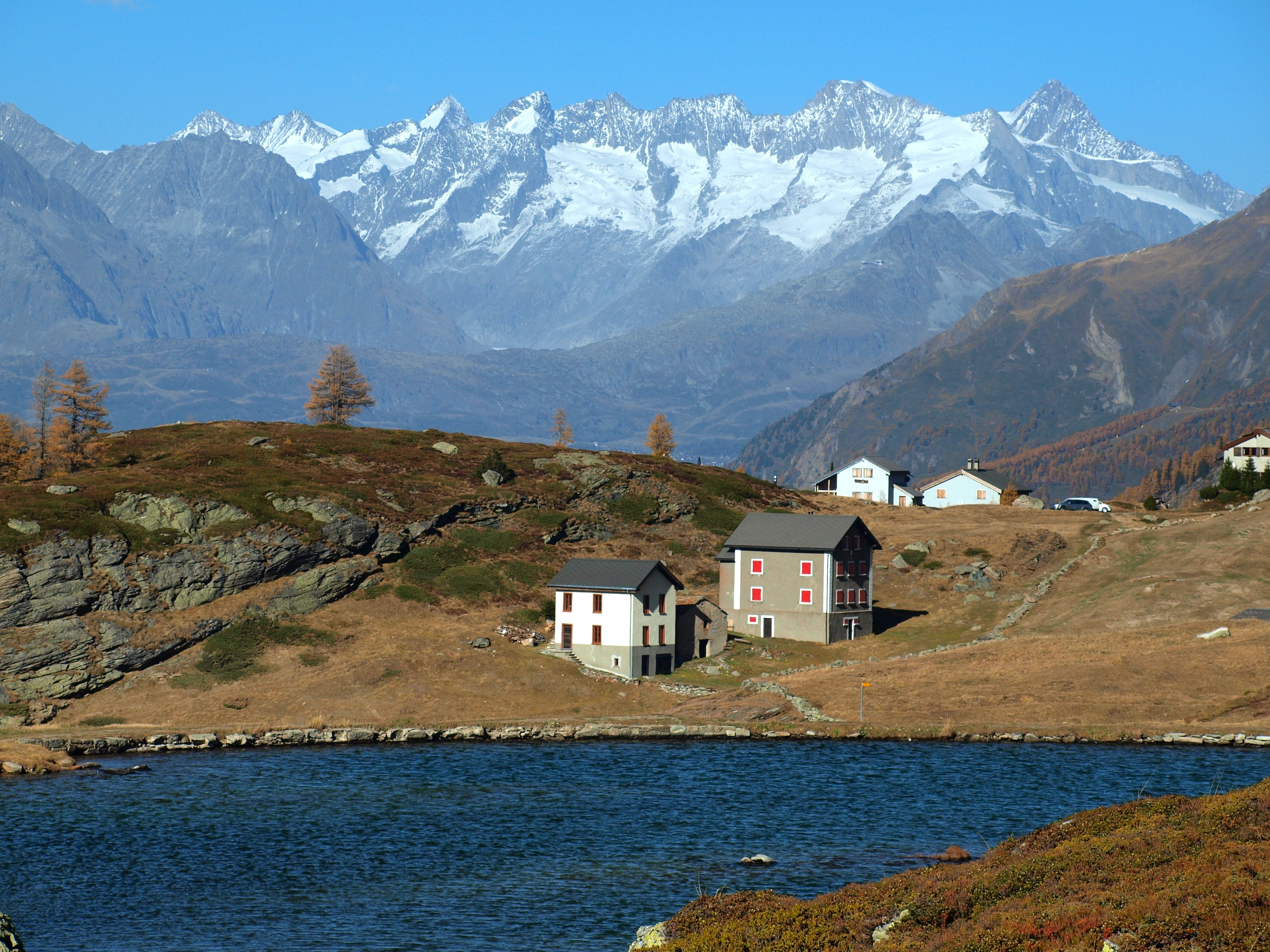
- Rotelsee at 2030 m Watershed between Po and Rhône at the trees on the hill

- Location within Canton of Valais Location within Switzerland Location within Alps
- Interactive map of Rotelsee
- Location: Simplon Pass, Valais
- Coordinates: 46°14′39″N 8°1′51″E
- Basin countries: Switzerland
- Surface area: 1.2 ha (3.0 acres)
- Surface elevation: 2,030 m (6,660 ft)

Rotelsee (also Rotelschsee) is a lake near Simplon Pass in the canton of Valais, Switzerland. The water of the lake powers a small turbine in the monastery Simplon Hospice. The distance from the lake to the monastery is 220m and the difference of altitude is 30m.

Lake Rotel lies only 300m from the watershed between Po and Rhône The water of Rotelsee flows → Chrummbach → Diveria → Toce → Lake Maggiore → Ticino → Po → Adriatic Sea.
