= Wasenhorn =

Mountain in Switzerland

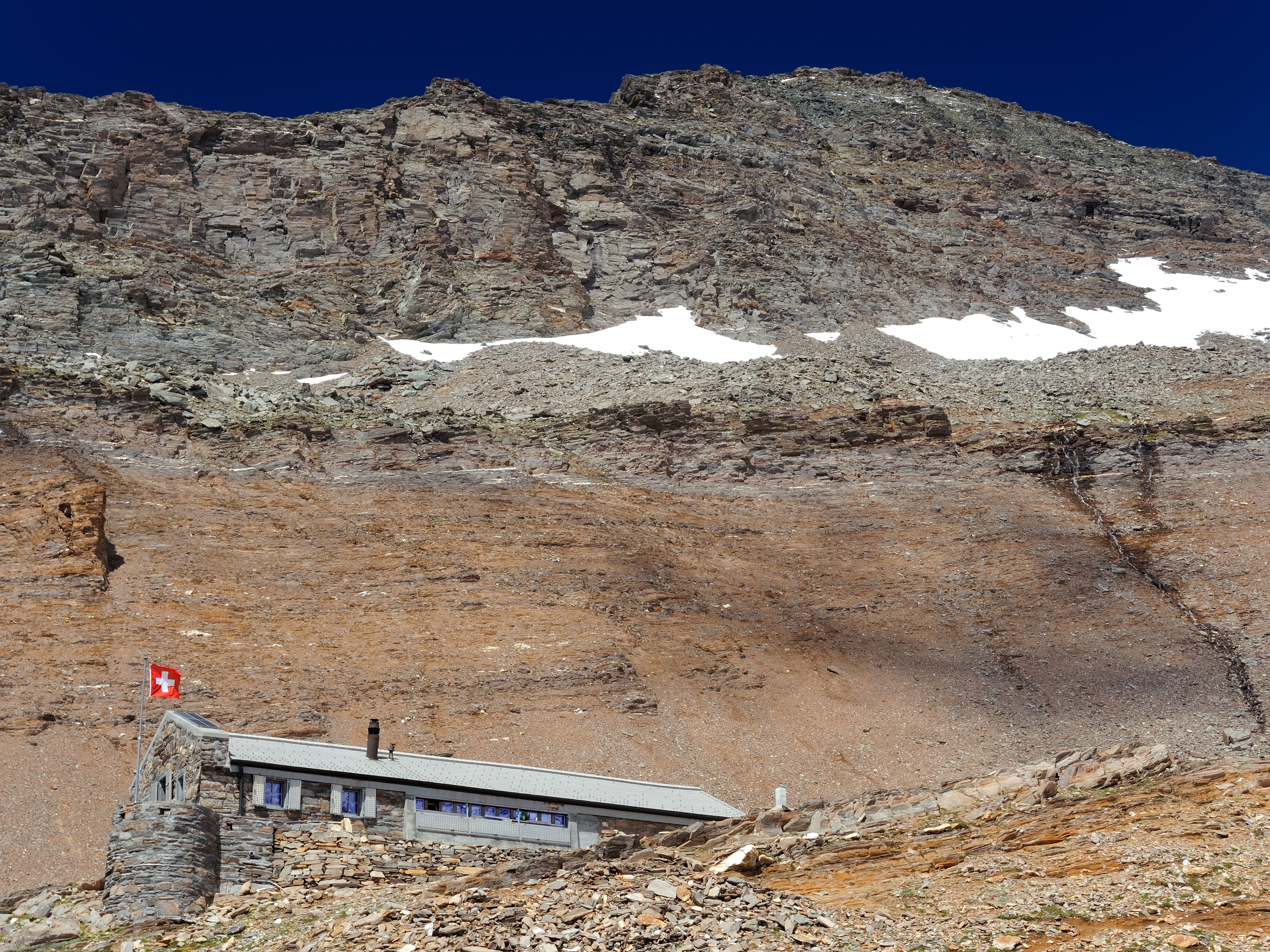
- The south side of the Wasenhorn from the Monte Leone Hut

Highest point
- Elevation: 3,246 m (10,650 ft)
- Prominence: 476 m (1,562 ft)
- Parent peak: Monte Leone
- Listing: Alpine mountains above 3000 m
- Coordinates: 46°16′00″N 8°05′09″E

Naming
- Native name: Wasenhorn (German); Punta Terrarossa (Italian)

Geography
- Location within Alps
- Countries: Switzerland and Italy
- Canton/Region: Valais and Piedmont
- Parent range: Lepontine Alps
- Topo map: Swiss Federal Office of Topography swisstopo

The Wasenhorn (German, Italian: Punta Terrarossa; 3,246 metres (10,650 ft)) is a mountain of the Lepontine Alps, located on the border between Switzerland and Italy. It lies halfway between Brig (Swiss canton of Valais) and Varzo (Italian region of Piedmont), just north of Monte Leone, in the Simplon Pass area. Politically the Wasenhorn is split between the municipalities of Ried-Brig and Varzo.

The Simplon Tunnel runs into the massif of the Wasenhorn, below the subsidiary summit named Tunnelspitz (2,903 m (9,524 ft)).

== Access road ==
Just follow the road towards the Simplon pass, either from Brig on the Swiss side, or from Domodossola on the Italian side.

== Climbing Route ==
The normal route to the summit of the Wasenhorn starts from the Monte Leone Hut of the Swiss Alpine Club (2,848 m (9,344 ft)), located on the south side of the mountain, above the Chaltwasser Pass, which connects the Simplon Pass with the Alpe Veglia.

To reach the hut from the Swiss side, there is a 2 hours 30 minute walk from the Simplon Hospiz which is at the Simplon pass road. From the hut to the summit takes a further one hour and thirty minutes.

An alternative, more technically demanding route to the summit of the Wasenhorn begins at the Mäderlücke – a pass between the Mäderhorn (2850 m) and the Wasenhorn – and runs along the south-western ridge of the Wasenhorn, featuring climbing sections up to UIAA grade II.

By continuing on towards the Aurona pass the Bivacco Farello is reached - a typical Alpine refuge.

== Other mountains around to climb ==
From the Simplon pass, climbers can reach other nearby mountains:

- Breithorn (Simplon).
- Hubschhorn.
- Monte Leone.
