= Simplon, Valais =

Simplon
- Municipality
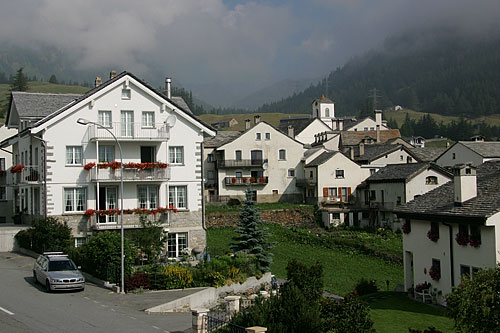

- Flag Coat of arms
- Location of Simplon
- Location within Switzerland Location within Canton of Valais
- Coordinates: 46°12′N 8°3′E
- Country: Switzerland
- Canton: Valais
- District: Brig

Government
  - Mayor: President; Sebastian Arnold

Area
  - Total: 90.9 km^{2} (35.1 sq mi)
- Elevation: 1,476 m (4,843 ft)

Population (2010)
  - Total: 329
  - Density: 3.62/km^{2} (9.37/sq mi)
- Time zone: UTC+01:00 (CET)
  - Summer (DST): UTC+02:00 (CEST)
- Postal code: 3907
- SFOS number: 6009
- ISO 3166 code: CH-VS
- Surrounded by: Brig-Glis, Eisten, Ried-Brig, Saas Almagell, Saas Balen, Saas Grund, Visperterminen, Zwischbergen
- Website: www.gemeinde-simplon.ch

Simplon (Walser: Simpilu; Italian: Sempione; French: Simplon), earlier known as Simpeln, is a municipality in the district of Brig in the canton of Valais in Switzerland.

== History ==
The area was part of Italy since the Roman Empire, but it was colonized by the Germans after 1000 AD, so the Bishop of Sion bought it from the counts of Novara in 1291. Simplon is first mentioned in 1267 as Simpilion. In 1285 it was mentioned as Xeinplon.

== Geography ==
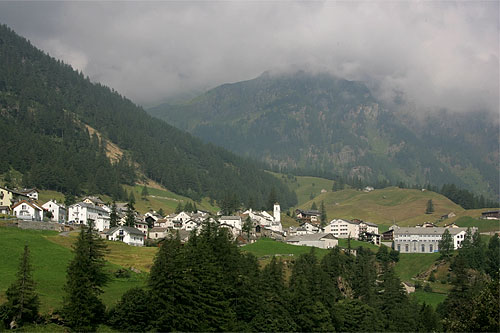
Simplon village

Simplon has an area, as of 2011, of 90.9 square kilometers (35.1 mi^{2}). Of this area, 21.5% is used for agricultural purposes, while 12.3% is forested. Of the rest of the land, 1.0% is settled (buildings or roads) and 65.2% is unproductive land.

The municipality is located in the Brig district, on the south side of the Simplon Pass near the Italian border. It consists of the village of Simplon and the hamlets of Gabi, Egga and Maschihüs as well as the Hospiz (Hospice) in the Simplon Pass.

== Coat of arms ==
The blazon of the municipal coat of arms is Argent, a bicephalous Eagle displayed Sable, crowned each Or and another Or ribboned Sable, langued and membered Gules, holding in dexter a Sword and in sinister a Sabre both Or, escutcheon Sable bordure Argent.

== Demographics ==
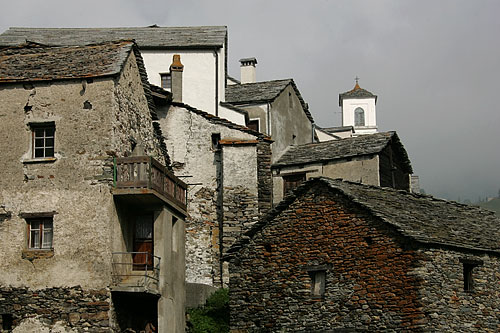
Traditional houses in Simplon village

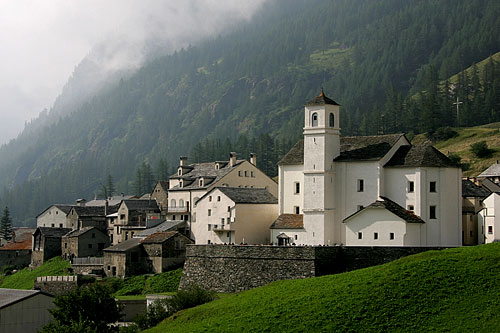
Simplon village and church

Simplon has a population (as of December 2020) of 292. As of 2008, 2.9% of the population are resident foreign nationals. Over the last 10 years (1999–2009 ) the population has changed at a rate of -6.2%. It has changed at a rate of -4.6% due to migration and at a rate of -3.2% due to births and deaths.

Most of the population (as of 2000) speaks German (322 or 96.7%) as their first language, French is the second most common (4 or 1.2%) and Italian is the third (3 or 0.9%).

As of 2008, the gender distribution of the population was 47.0% male and 53.0% female. The population was made up of 159 Swiss men (45.6% of the population) and 5 (1.4%) non-Swiss men. There were 177 Swiss women (50.7%) and 8 (2.3%) non-Swiss women. Of the population in the municipality 246 or about 73.9% were born in Simplon and lived there in 2000. There were 64 or 19.2% who were born in the same canton, while 13 or 3.9% were born somewhere else in Switzerland, and 7 or 2.1% were born outside of Switzerland. The age distribution of the population (as of 2000) is children and teenagers (0–19 years old) make up 25.8% of the population, while adults (20–64 years old) make up 57.1% and seniors (over 64 years old) make up 17.1%.

As of 2000, there were 146 people who were single and never married in the municipality. There were 164 married individuals, 19 widows or widowers and 4 individuals who are divorced.

As of 2000, there were 116 private households in the municipality, and an average of 2.7 persons per household. There were 29 households that consist of only one person and 14 households with five or more people. Out of a total of 118 households that answered this question, 24.6% were households made up of just one person and there were 3 adults who lived with their parents. Of the rest of the households, there are 21 married couples without children, 56 married couples with children. There were 4 single parents with a child or children. There were 3 households that were made up of unrelated people and 2 households that were made up of some sort of institution or another collective housing.

In 2000 there were 88 single family homes (or 60.7% of the total) out of a total of 145 inhabited buildings. There were 30 multi-family buildings (20.7%), along with 12 multi-purpose buildings that were mostly used for housing (8.3%) and 15 other use buildings (commercial or industrial) that also had some housing (10.3%).

In 2000, a total of 108 apartments (55.7% of the total) were permanently occupied, while 73 apartments (37.6%) were seasonally occupied and 13 apartments (6.7%) were empty. The vacancy rate for the municipality, in 2010, was 2.49%.

The historical population is given in the following chart:

== Heritage sites of national significance ==
The old Hospice (Hospice for travelers over the Simplon Pass) is listed as a Swiss heritage site of national significance. The village of Simplon, the hamlet of Eggen and the Simplon Pass area are all part of the Inventory of Swiss Heritage Sites.

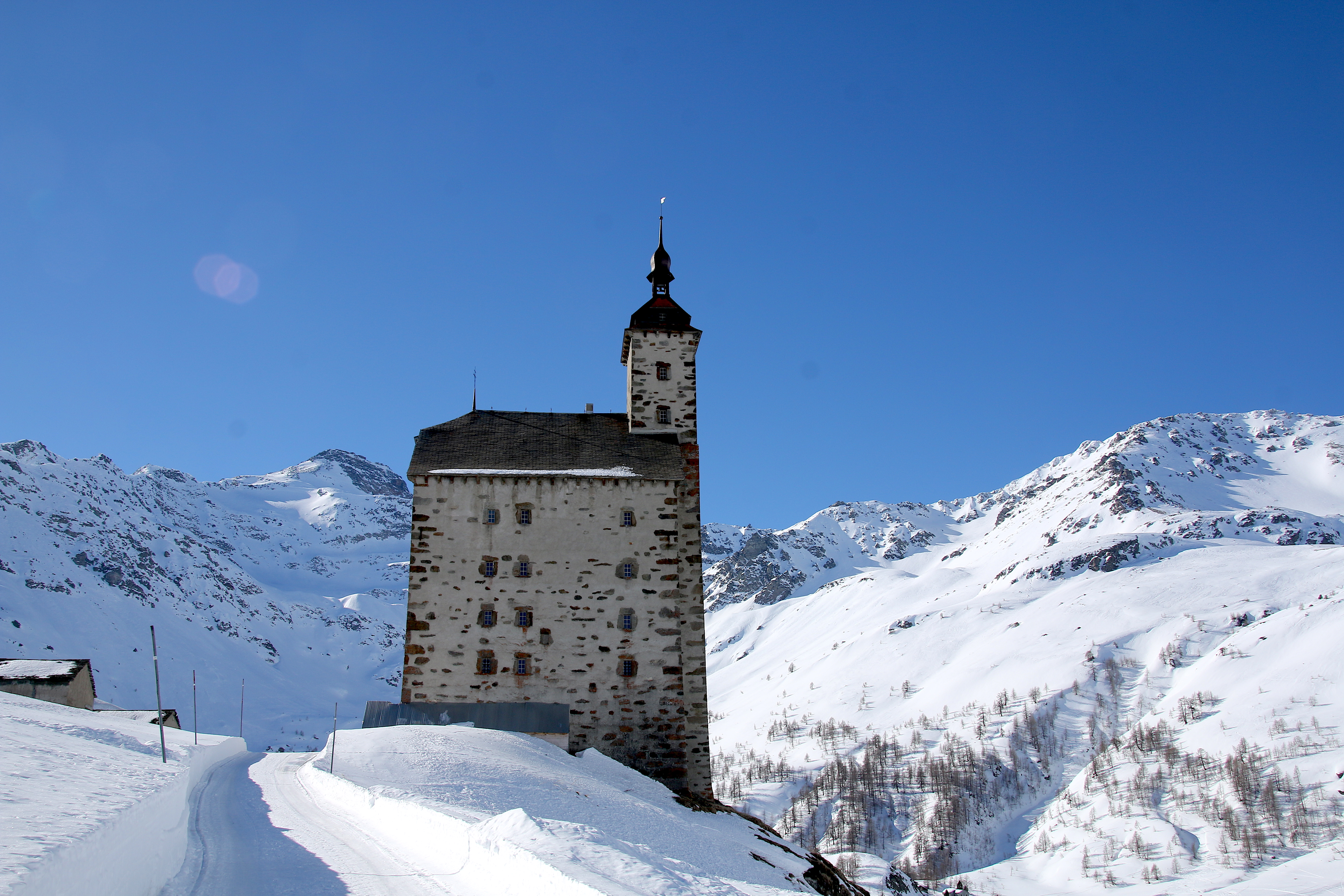
The Old Hospice

The Simplon Hospice was begun in 1801 on orders from Napoleon, but was not finished until 30 years later with the support of the Canons of Great Saint Bernard.

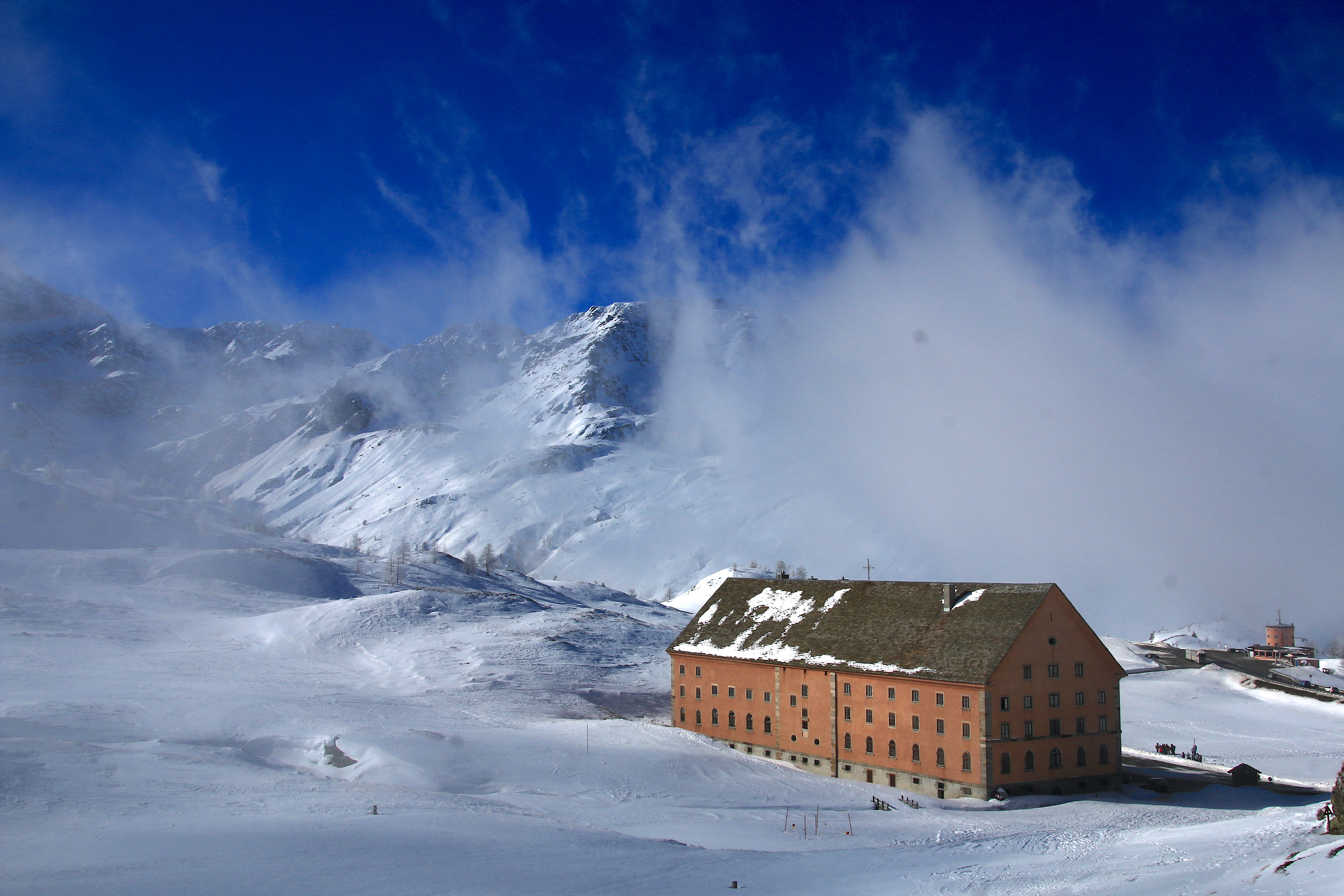
Simplon Hospice in wintertime

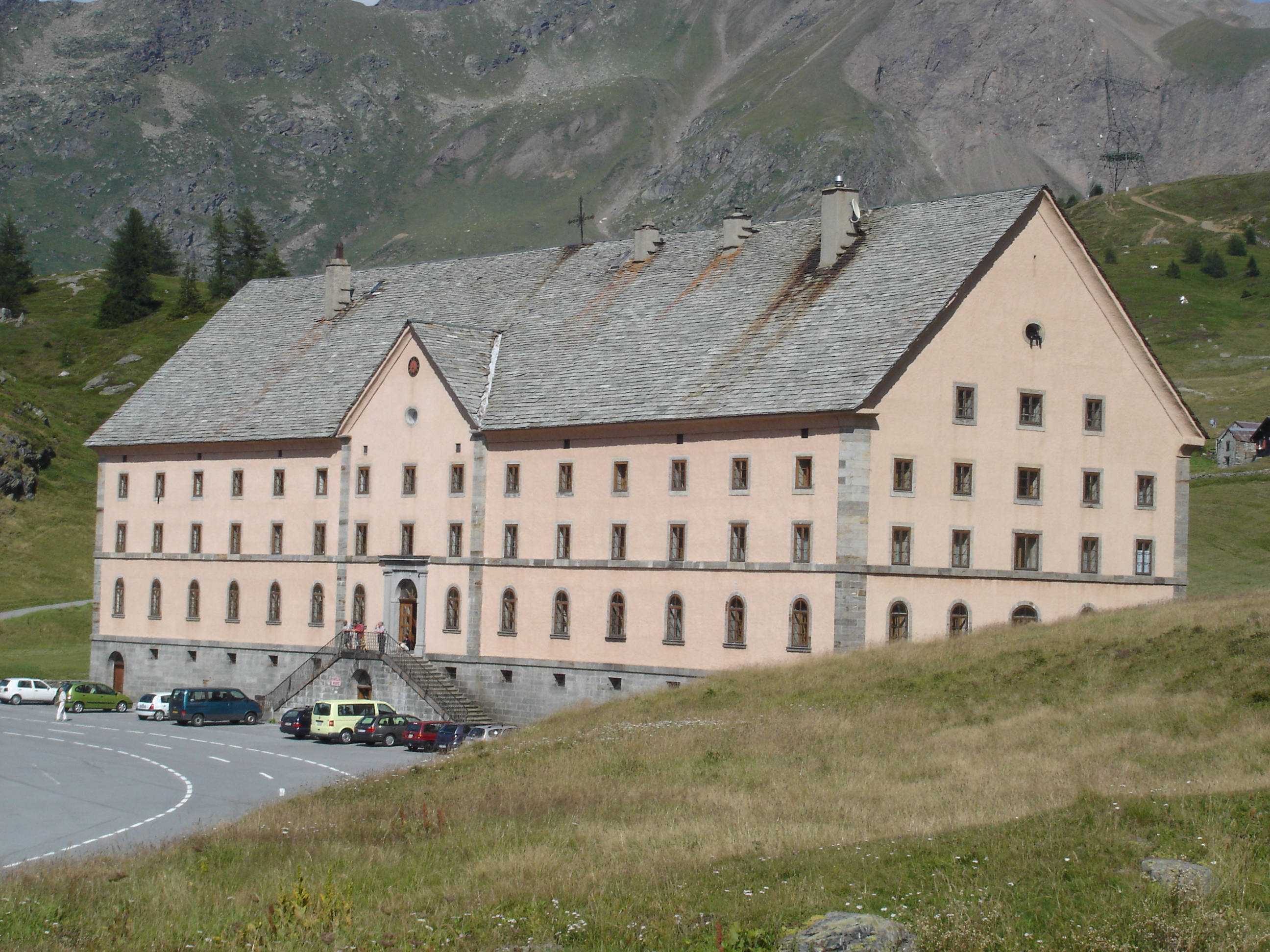
The Hospice in the Simplon Pass

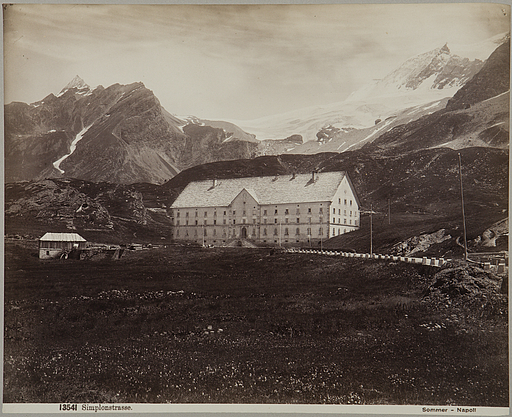
Early 20th Century picture of the Simplon Hospice

== Politics ==
In the 2007 federal election the most popular party was the CVP which received 69.29% of the vote. The next three most popular parties were the SP (14.9%), the SVP (12.97%) and the FDP (1.67%). In the federal election, a total of 175 votes were cast, and the voter turnout was 65.8%. In the 2009 Conseil d'État/Staatsrat election a total of 192 votes were cast, of which 9 or about 4.7% were invalid. The voter participation was 71.4%, which is much more than the cantonal average of 54.67%. In the 2007 Swiss Council of States election a total of 174 votes were cast, of which 4 or about 2.3% were invalid. The voter participation was 67.2%, which is much more than the cantonal average of 59.88%.

== Economy ==
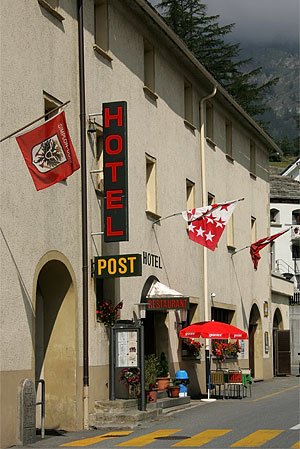
Hotel Post in the village

As of 2010, Simplon had an unemployment rate of 0.2%. As of 2008, there were 42 people employed in the primary economic sector and about 22 businesses involved in this sector. 59 people were employed in the secondary sector and there were 7 businesses in this sector. 78 people were employed in the tertiary sector, with 19 businesses in this sector. There were 175 residents of the municipality who were employed in some capacity, of which females made up 38.9% of the workforce.

In 2008 the total number of full-time equivalent jobs was 142. The number of jobs in the primary sector was 24, of which 19 were in agriculture and 4 were in forestry or lumber production. The number of jobs in the secondary sector was 58 of which 15 or (25.9%) were in manufacturing and 43 (74.1%) were in construction. The number of jobs in the tertiary sector was 60. In the tertiary sector; 7 or 11.7% were in wholesale or retail sales or the repair of motor vehicles, 4 or 6.7% were in the movement and storage of goods, 31 or 51.7% were in a hotel or restaurant, 1 was the insurance or financial industry, 5 or 8.3% were in education.

In 2000, there were 74 workers who commuted into the municipality and 43 workers who commuted away. The municipality is a net importer of workers, with about 1.7 workers entering the municipality for every one leaving. About 43.2% of the workforce coming into Simplon are coming from outside Switzerland. Of the working population, 10.9% used public transportation to get to work, and 31.4% used a private car.

== Religion ==
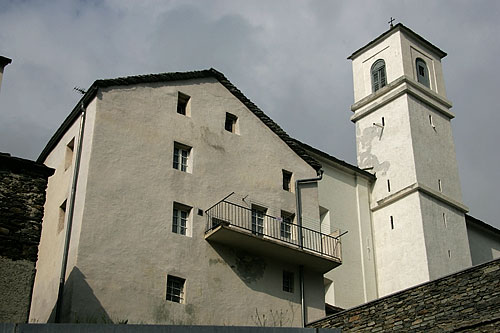
Village church

From the 2000 census, 319 or 95.8% were Roman Catholic, while 7 or 2.1% belonged to the Swiss Reformed Church. There was 1 individual who was Jewish, and there was 1 individual who was Islamic. 2 (or about 0.60% of the population) belonged to no church, are agnostic or atheist, and 3 individuals (or about 0.90% of the population) did not answer the question.

== Education ==
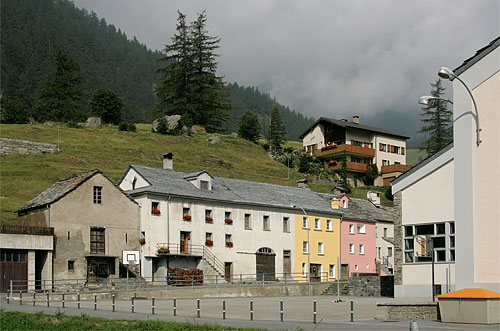
School house plaza in Simplon

In Simplon about 97 or (29.1%) of the population have completed non-mandatory upper secondary education, and 15 or (4.5%) have completed additional higher education (either university or a Fachhochschule). Of the 15 who completed tertiary schooling, 73.3% were Swiss men, 26.7% were Swiss women.

During the 2010–2011 school year there were a total of 13 students in the Simplon school system. The education system in the Canton of Valais allows young children to attend one year of non-obligatory Kindergarten. During that school year, there were no kindergarten classes (KG1 or KG2) and there were no kindergarten students. The canton's school system requires students to attend six years of primary school. In Simplon there were a total of 2 classes and 13 students in the primary school. The secondary school program consists of three lower, obligatory years of schooling (orientation classes), followed by three to five years of optional, advanced schools. All the lower secondary students from Simplon attend their school in a neighboring municipality. All the upper secondary students attended school in another municipality.

As of 2000, there was one student in Simplon who came from another municipality, while 2 residents attended schools outside the municipality.

== Notable residents ==
The former member of the Swiss Federal Council Josef Escher was born in Simplon.

== See also ==
- Gondo Gold Mine
