= Erwin Friedrich Baumann =

Swiss architect and sculptor (1890–1980)

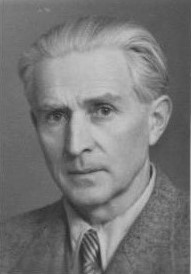
E. F. Baumann in 1947

Erwin Friedrich Baumann (October 27, 1890 – February 8, 1980) was a Swiss architect and sculptor.

== Life and work ==
Erwin Friedrich Baumann was born in 1890 in Bern as the second of four children of the master builder and politician Friedrich Baumann (1835–1910) and Marie-Louise Baumann-Bigler (1856–1937). Right before starting school he got diphtheria, and the medical treatment at Rotbad (Diemtigtal) led to severe problems at school. Baumann writes in one of his biographical notes: "With the lowest quarter of my class I managed to get into the high school and may as well have slipped into the lecture-halls of the universities."

Because of obstinacy towards one of his teachers, Baumann had to leave the high school.

After a year of practical work with an architect in Vevey followed his basic and non-commissioned officer training in the cavalry, then his high school graduation from the Minerva School in Zurich, and studies in art history and mathematics at the University of Bern. In 1911 he joined the students fraternity Rhenania, which regularly met at the restaurant Bubenberg in Bern. Here, Baumann often joined a table of Bernese artists (where he met among others Ferdinand Hodler). This company promoted his decision "to carve in the future not only heraldry and statuettes with his army knife." Insufficient and negligent care of his wounds after a fall from a horse during his training as non-commissioned officer, resulted in tuberculosis, what lead at last to his release from the army.

In spite of this incident, Baumann dared to join the department of architecture of the Institute of Technology in Darmstadt. The decorative sculpting course of Professor Augusto Varnesi as well as the Darmstadt Artists' Colony Mathildenhöhe inspired him. However, the World War I set an end to his studies in Germany.

After the outbreak of the war, Baumann, still with fragile health, participated as volunteer in protecting the Swiss border. In 1915 he was again released from military service and went for health treatments in Davos and Arosa. In 1918 Baumann joined the architectural office of Rudolf Gaberel in Davos, where he maintained friendships with Jakob Bosshart, Wilhelm Schwerzmann and the expressionist Ernst Ludwig Kirchner. In 1919, he won the first prize in a contest for a monument for the Bernese cavalry units on the Lueg near Burgdorf. This project was, however, not realized, because he refused, to combine it with a, in his eyes, worthless relief of the sculptor Karl Hänny. In 1920, he acted on behalf of Rudolf Gaberel as local contractor and artistic designer for the forest cemetery Wildboden Davos.

In summer 1921 Baumann stayed in Paris as sculptor with Antoine Bourdelle. In the years 1921/22 he traveled to Egypt, where he worked as sculptor and architect and where he met among others Mahmoud Mokhtar. A longer educational trip through Greece, the Balkans and Austria lead Baumann back to Davos, where he worked again for Gaberel from 1922 through 1924.

From 1924 to 1929 Baumann lived in California. His brother Paul Baumann also lived there, working as an engineer. During this time, Baumann created numerous wood and stone sculptures, and on the side he was active as an architect. In 1925, he won the first prize for the artistic decoration of the main lobby in a new department store construction in Los Angeles, and in 1928 he won an award from the Los Angeles art museum for his stone sculpture Quarryman.

In 1929 Baumann went back to Switzerland, where he worked in Davos, Bern and Münchwilen. In 1938 he married the Russian-born Swiss Rita Keller and spent several months in Paris as sculptor under the guidance of Ossip Zadkine. In the year 1939, immediately before the outbreak of the Second World War, he acquired a farmhouse in Faulensee/Spiez, which he renovated as home for his family. At the outbreak of the war he volunteered again to participate in a civil guard unit of the army.

Because of an illness of his wife, Baumann moved in 1960 to Bern. Till he died in the year 1980, Baumann had a workshop in the old animal hospital of Bern. Among his noteworthy works created in Faulensee and Bern are the following: The capitals of the castle of Wimmis (1950), the communion table in the church Lerchenfeld/Thun (1951), a fountain sculpture at the schoolhouse Krattigen (1953), the restoration of the Tschan house on the Schüpf in Faulensee (1952), of the Romanesque church Einigen/Spiez (1954/55), of the historic inn St. Urs in Biberist (1958–1962), of the farmhouse "Les Aroles" as annex of the Palace Hotel (now owned by Spiros Latsis) in Gstaad (1954), and of the church Radelfingen/Aarberg (1958–65), the excavation of the St. Columban chapel in Faulensee (1960/61) and the construction management for the expansion of the sugar factory Aarberg (1958–1960), for the new construction of the British embassy in Bern (1962) and for the administrative building of the Bernese power company (1960–1963).

=== The Eagle on the Simplon pass ===
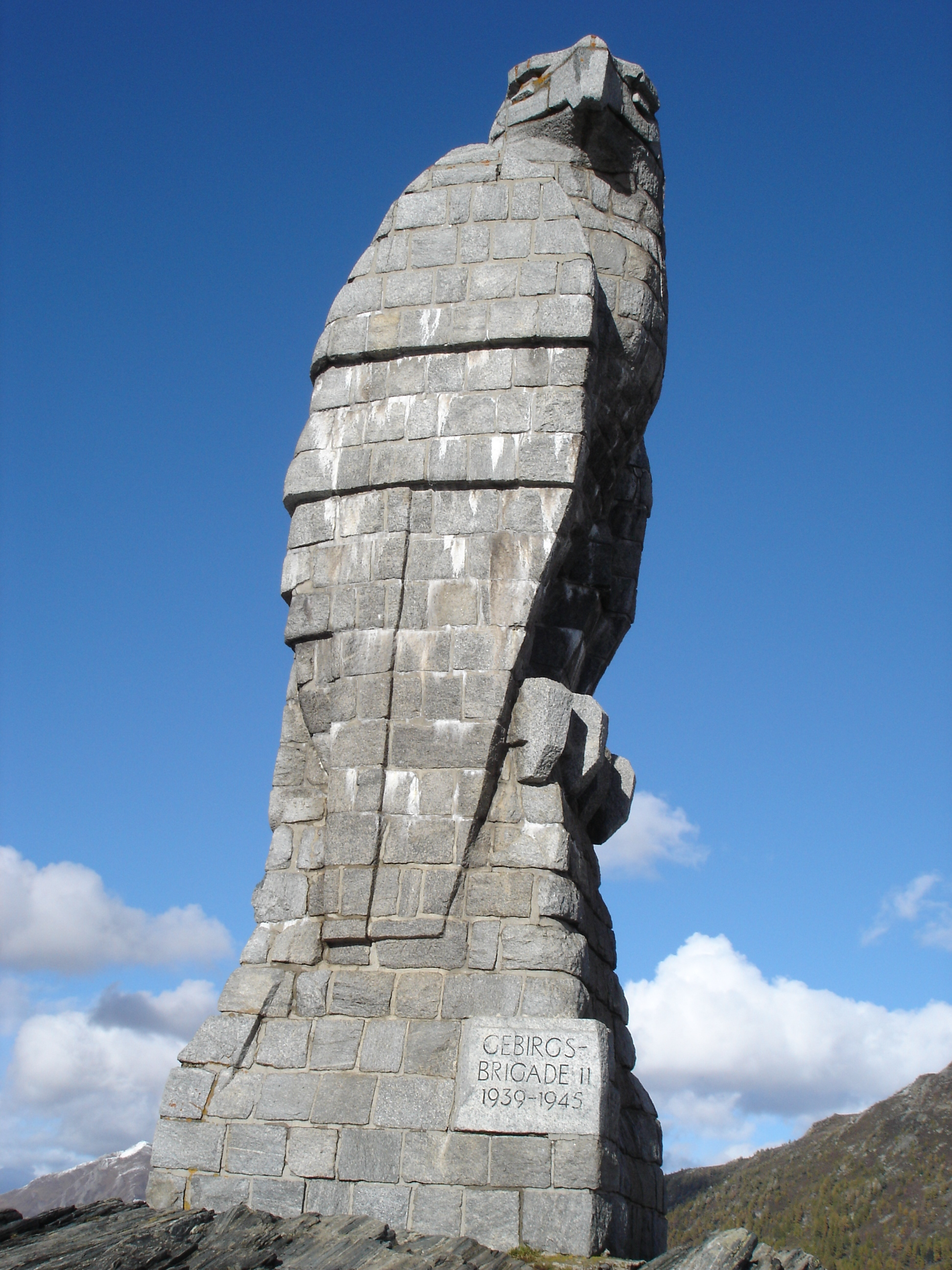
Stone eagle by Erwin Friedrich Baumann on the Simplon pass in the Valais Alps

Officers of the mountain brigade considered to erect a cenotaph for the golden eagle, the symbol of the brigade, from stone tailings of the fortification Gondo. Baumann had good connections to the commanders of the brigade. Brigadier Hans Bühler was married to his second cousin, and he knew the colonel of the engineer corps, Werner Grimm, since his youth in Bern. Baumann got the job to explore the possibilities and his proposal of an over nine meter high monument made of the tailings pleased the two superiors. Baumann described his approach in the following way:

"From the standpoint of a sculptor he regarded it as imperative to find a new sculpting technique and to adopt the project to this new technique, without affecting its artistic value. Furthermore, he was anxious to find a process, which would already be familiar to the quarryman and the mason from their common practices. Consequently the only option was a traditional construction plan and alignment stage for the builder to feel at ease and in familiar territory with his tools and skills. Easy to handle additions were a pair of dividers and a plaster model serving as a solid and conclusive reference model. With level, angle and circle alone it was not possible to cope with the 1:10 scale plaster original. The elevation plans turned out imprecise to the extent that it was impossible to use them for a tenfold magnification. But the model exemplifying the exact alignment, together with the moulds used to form the pieces of this model, produced unexpectedly well aligned results. The moulds are inverse forms used to create the 1:10 scale plaster model, which gave a clear footprint and allowed to establish any cross sectional view, horizontal or vertical. The assembled model and its moulds also had the advantage to draw attention to any infringements on the given practice and technology of common stonemasonry. Every layer of the model could be assembled by itself on the drawing board and be drawn in its internal details. In such drawings, the masonry could be put down, studied and clarified in all its details. The changes that thus became necessary appeared almost infinite. Fifteen, twenty layers had to be developed to be able to adapt all the corrections to the various affected cross sections. This was intense work lasting not only days, but in some cases even weeks."

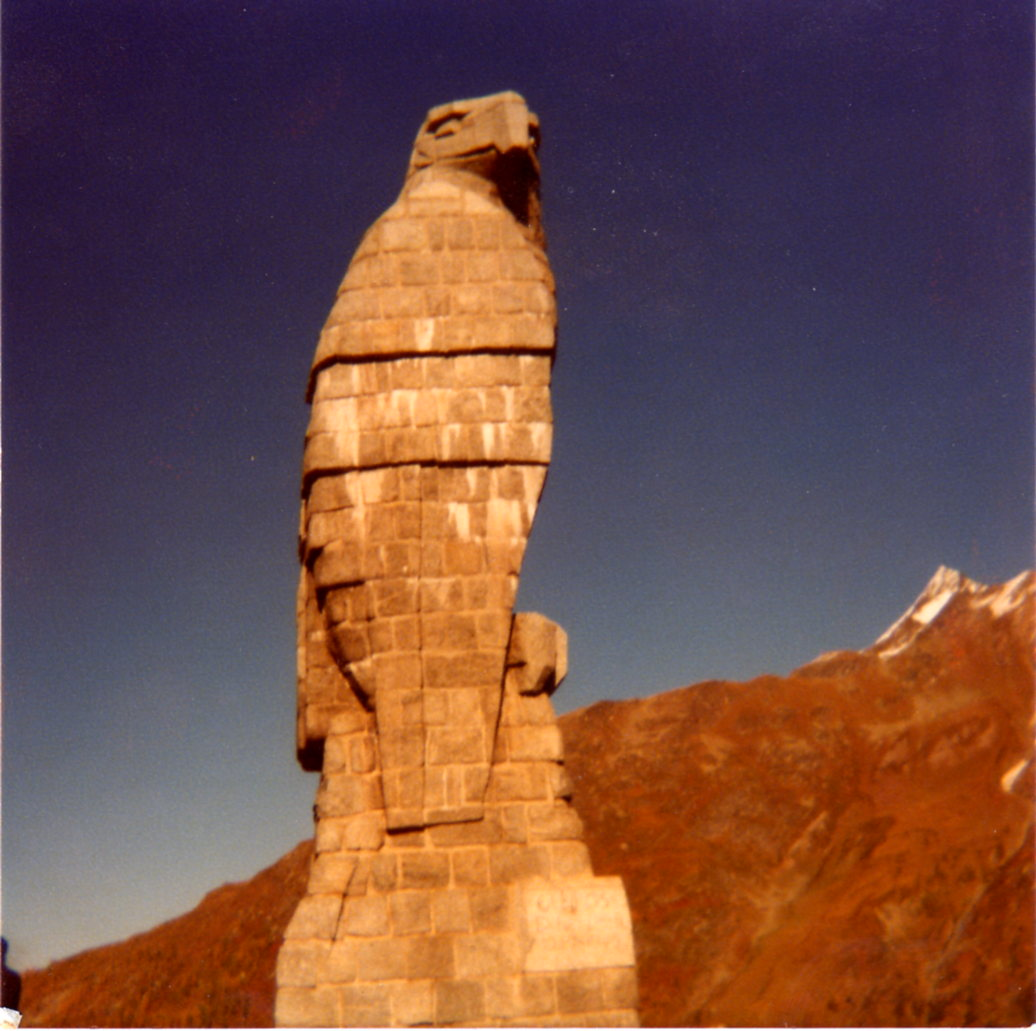
The Simplon Pass eagle monument as seen at sunset

Linus Birchler wrote in 1954 to Baumann:

"I would never have thought that the monumental eagle on the Simplon is your work, and I can hardly fathom what great technical problems had to be overcome in its creation. In the future, when talking about the colossi of Memnon and the rock temples of Abu Simbel in my lectures, I will also quote your eagle created in such an extraordinary, inventive manner no one thought of before."

In 1943 it came to a rift between engineer corps chief Werner Grimm and Baumann. Grimm posed continually as the builder of the Simplon eagle. That deeply hurt Baumann's feelings and even motivated him to stay away from the unveiling ceremonies in September 1944 on the Simplon.

=== Works (selection) ===
- 1920, "Contest cavalry monument at Lueg near Burgdorf"
- 1940, "A pair of lovers", donation to the Swiss help for refugees
- 1941, "Contest relief PTT administrative building Bern, Fight"
- 1942, "Miner group"
- 1944, "Simplon eagle"
- 1945, "Mother and child, horse"
- 1950, "Four pillar capitals for castle of Wimmis"
- 1952, "Communion table church Lerchenfeld"
- 1953, "Contest the unknown political prisoner"
- 1954, "Project Parzival fountain construction Migros Spiez, blazonry Amtshaus Langnau im Emmental"
