= Simplon Hospice =

Hospice in Switzerland

Coordinates: 46°14′47″N 008°1′45″E

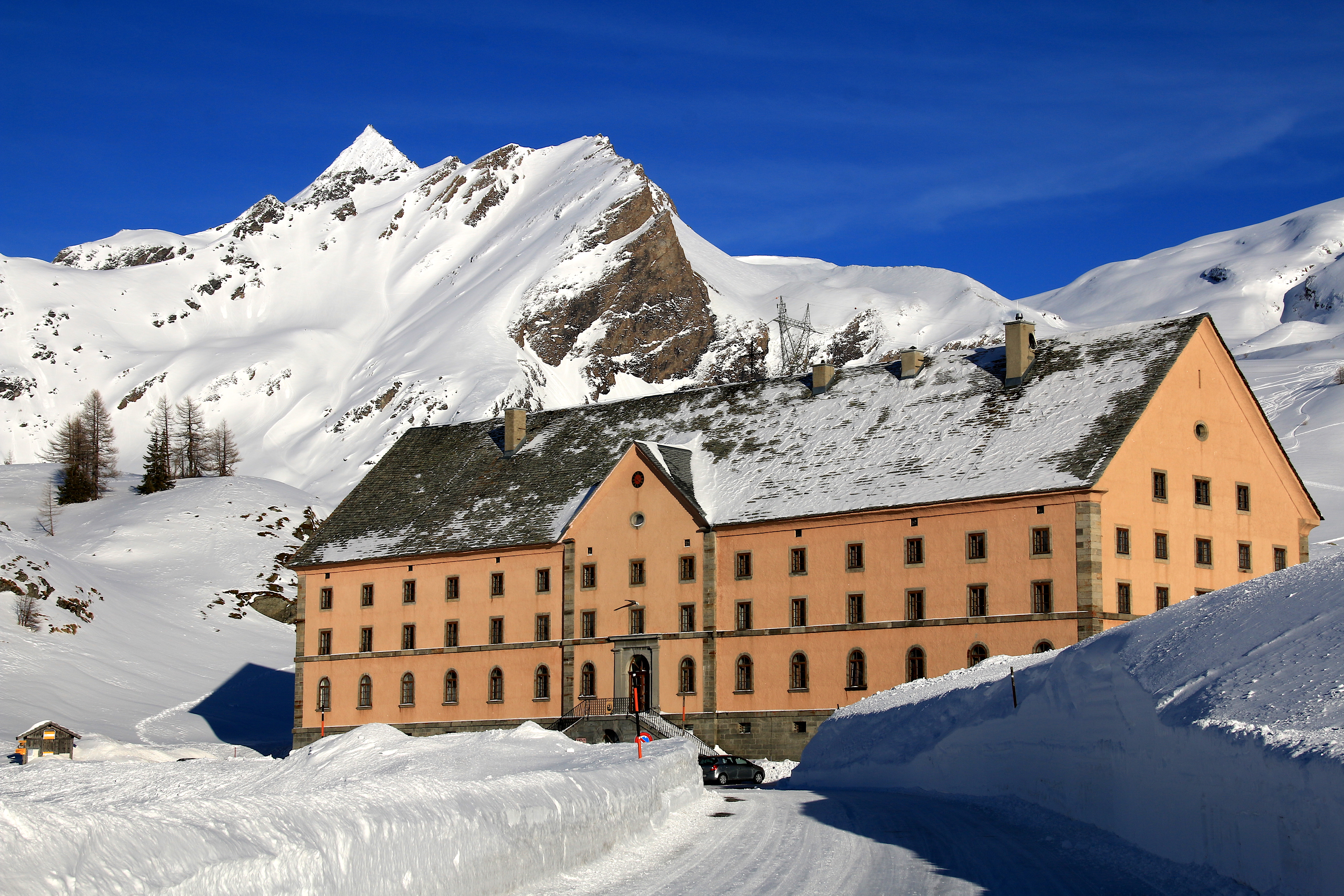
Simplon Hospice in winter time

The Simplon Hospice is a large building where travellers and merchants can get food, accommodation and shelter from the harsh climate. In a decree of 21 February 1801 Napoleon Bonaparte commissioned the building of a hospice on top of the Simplon Pass. The hospice has always been run by the Canons of Saint Augustine.

The Simplon Hospice is located 1,998 m (6,555 ft) above sea level at the mountain saddle of the Simplon Pass.

== History ==
Priors
Period	Prior
1802 (Juli/Aug)	Gabriel d’Allèves
1802–1807	Laurent-Hippolyte Ballet
1807–1821	Gabriel d’Allèves
1821–1835	Etienne-Sébastien Pellaux
1835	Jean-Baptiste Darbellay
1836–1858	Pierre-Joseph Barras
1858–1861	Pierre-Joseph Deléglise
1862–1875	Basile Frossard
1876–1877	Camille Rosset
1877–1892	Angelin Carron
1898–1910	Maurice Borter
1910–1930	André Favre
1930–1934	Candide Borgeat
1934–1940	Etienne Coquoz
1940–1943	Clément Moulin
1943–1946	Fabien Melly
1946–1950	Antoine Mudry
1950–1952	Lucien Quaglia
1952–1959	René Giroud
1959–1966	Gratien Volluz
1966–1968	Paul Bruchez
1968–1971	Jean Emonet
1971–1974	Jean-Claude Ducrey
1974–1983	Benoît Vouilloz
1983–1995	Klaus Sarbach
1995–2007	Michel Praplan
2007–2009	Jean-Pierre Voutaz
2009–2012	Daniel Salzgeber
2012–2015	Jean-Pascal Genoud
2015–2023	François Lamon
2023–today	Daniel Salzgeber

The Napoleon-Road over the Simplon Pass and through the Gorge of Gondo was opened in 1806.
