= Simplon Pass =

High mountain pass between the Pennines and Lepontine Alps in Switzerland

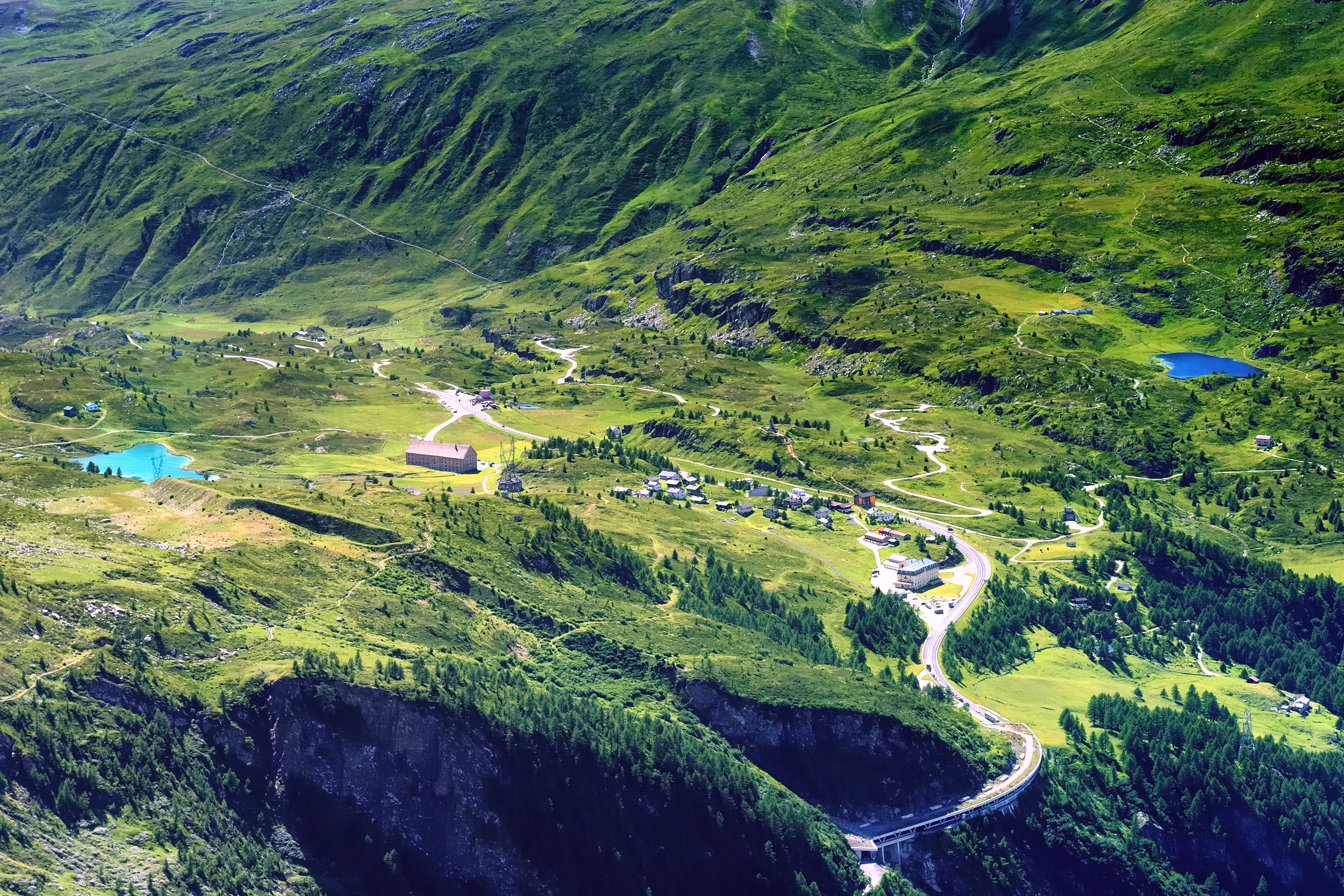
- View of the Simplon Pass from above with the Rotelsee (left) and Lake Hopschu (right). Note the slightly lower marshland behind the road.

- Location within Switzerland
- Elevation: 2,006 m (6,581 ft)
- Traversed by: Road

Location
- Location: Valais, Switzerland
- Range: Alps
- Coordinates: 46°15′6″N 8°2′0″E

The Simplon Pass (French: Col du Simplon; German: Simplonpass; Italian: Passo del Sempione; Lombard: Pass del Sempion; 2,006 m or 6,581 ft; Romansh: Pass dal Simplon) is a high mountain pass between the Pennine Alps and the Lepontine Alps in Switzerland. It connects Brig in the canton of Valais with Domodossola in Piedmont (Italy). The pass itself and the villages on each side of it, such as Gondo, are in Switzerland. The Simplon Tunnel was built beneath the vicinity of the pass in the early 20th century to carry rail traffic between the two countries.

The lowest point of the col, and the lowest point on the watershed between the basins of the Rhone and the Po in Switzerland lies in marshland about 500 m (1,640 ft) west of the Simplon Pass settlement at an altitude of 1,995 m or 6,545 ft.

Rotelsee is a lake located near the pass at an elevation of 2,028 m (6,654 ft).

There are several high peaks around that can be climbed directly from the pass. These include Wasenhorn, Hubschhorn, Breithorn (Simplon), and Monte Leone.

== History ==
The hospice in 1914

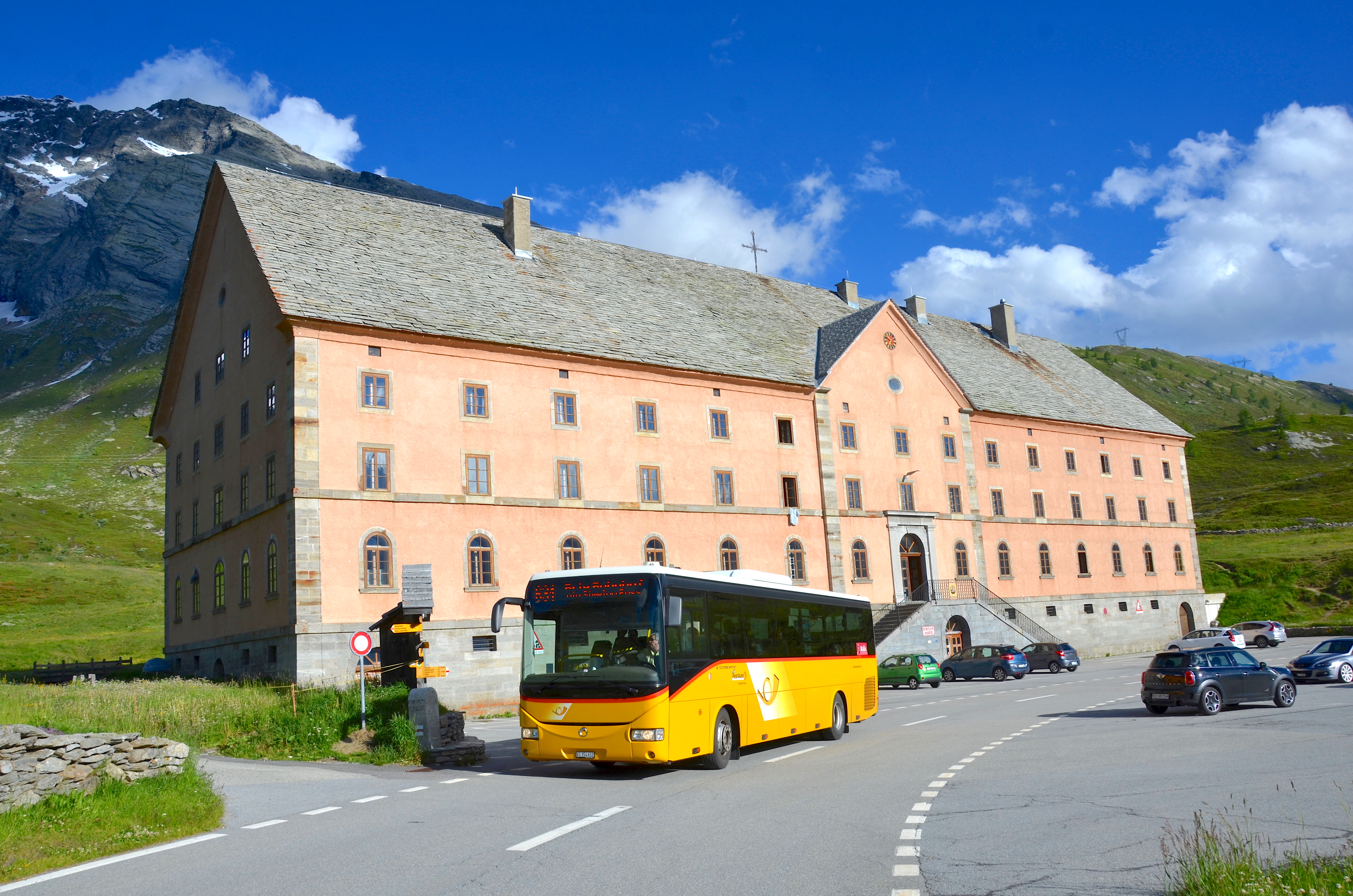
Post bus at the hospice

There had been a locally used passage through the mountains here for several centuries, but the pass acquired international significance during the Napoleonic occupation. Between 1801 and 1805 the Simplon Road was constructed by the engineer Nicolas Céard at the direction of the emperor in order to transport artillery pieces through the pass between the Rhône valley and Italy. Since then, the pass has been usable by road vehicles: first post carriages, replaced early in the twentieth century by post buses.

The road was periodically improved and in 1950 the cantonal authorities created a plan whereby the pass could be kept open all through the year, and not closed to traffic between October and late April, like most Alpine passes at this altitude. The improvements included several lengthy avalanche shelters along the more exposed stretches of road and the expansion of certain road tunnels to accommodate full size tourist coaches which were significantly taller than the post buses used for local passengers. In October 1970, a party of journalists was invited to inspect the improvements and it was announced that the necessary improvements had been implemented on 37 km (23 mi) of the 42.5 km (26.4 mi) between Brig in Valais and the Italian frontier at Gondo, that 110 of the 180 million Swiss francs budgeted to the project had been spent and that, while a further five years would be needed to complete all the projected improvements, the Simplon Pass could now be used safely all through the year. The former Simplon département (the Swiss canton Valais) was named after the pass.

The Simplon Pass was also outfitted with rails for train service. The 20 km (12 mi)-long Simplon Tunnel was opened in 1906. The historic Orient Express used the Simplon route intermittently during the twentieth century, as it carried passengers between Istanbul and Paris. Despite the opening of the Simplon Tunnel, the pass has retained its importance as ransalpine transport corridor. The Simplon Road remains one of the few major Alpine passes that are routinely kept open throughout the year, providing an alternative route for road traffic between the upper Rhône valley and northern Italy when weather or operational conditions affect other Alpine crossings.

The Hospice du Simplon, at the top of the pass, is owned by the Congregation of Canons Regular at Grand-Saint-Bernard.

== Monuments ==
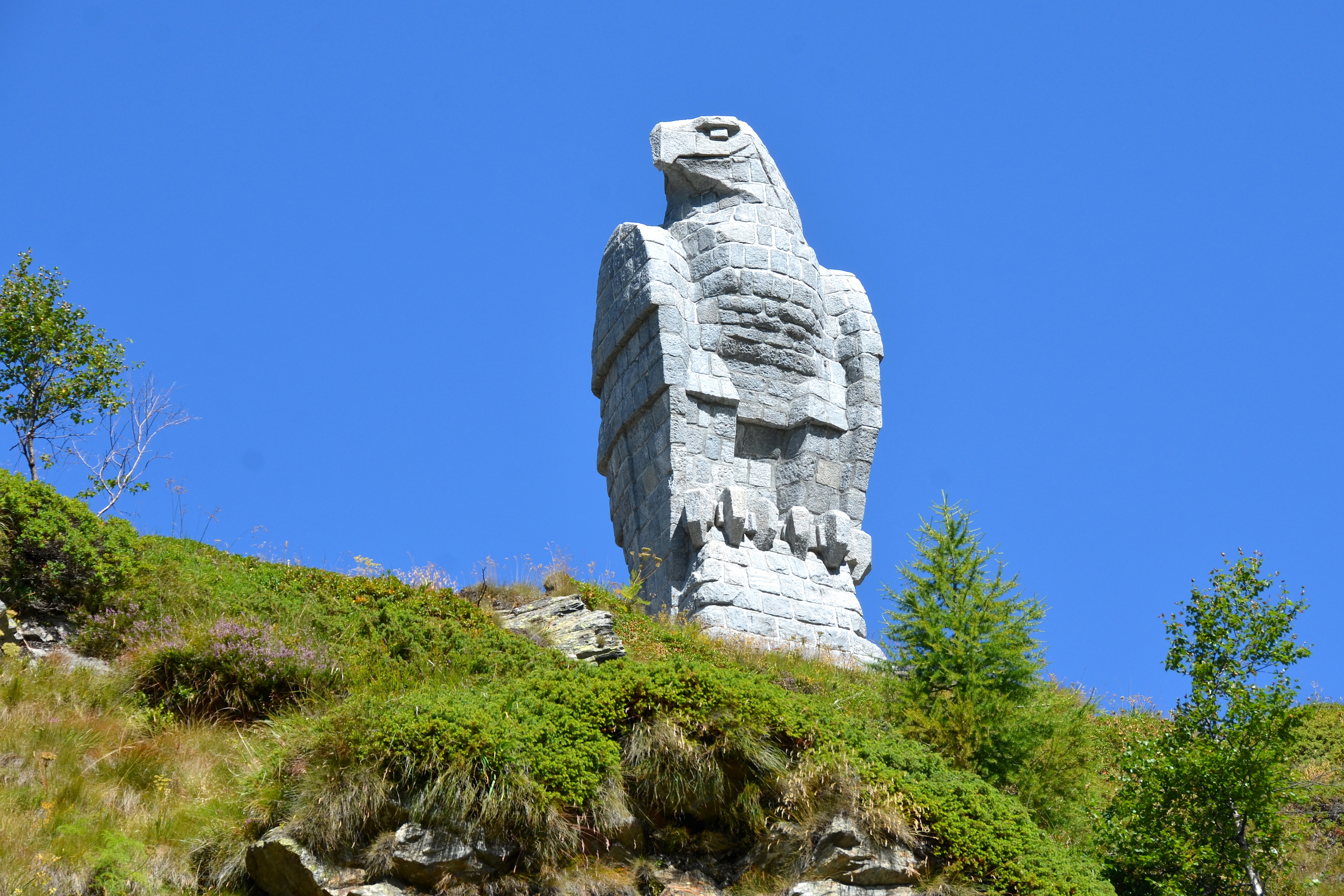
The Simplon Eagle

During the Second World War, officers of the 11th Alpine Brigade of the Swiss Army, based in Zwischbergen, proposed the construction of the stone monument depicting an eagle, the symbol of the brigade. The Bernese architect Erwin Friedrich Baumann designed the monument based on the use of granite blocks from the old fortification of Gondo (a town near the pass) to build a statue about nine meters high. The monument was inaugurated in September 1944.

In 2005, a memorial was built representing the 200th anniversary of the construction of the "Napoleon Road".

== See also ==
- Val Divedro
- List of highest paved roads in Europe
- List of mountain passes
- List of the highest Swiss passes

== Picture ==
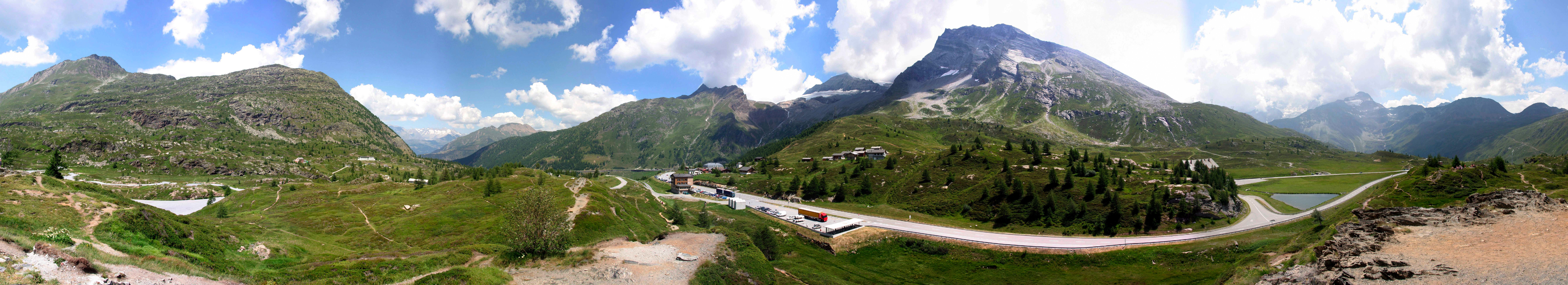
Panoramic view of the Simplon pass

== Gallery ==
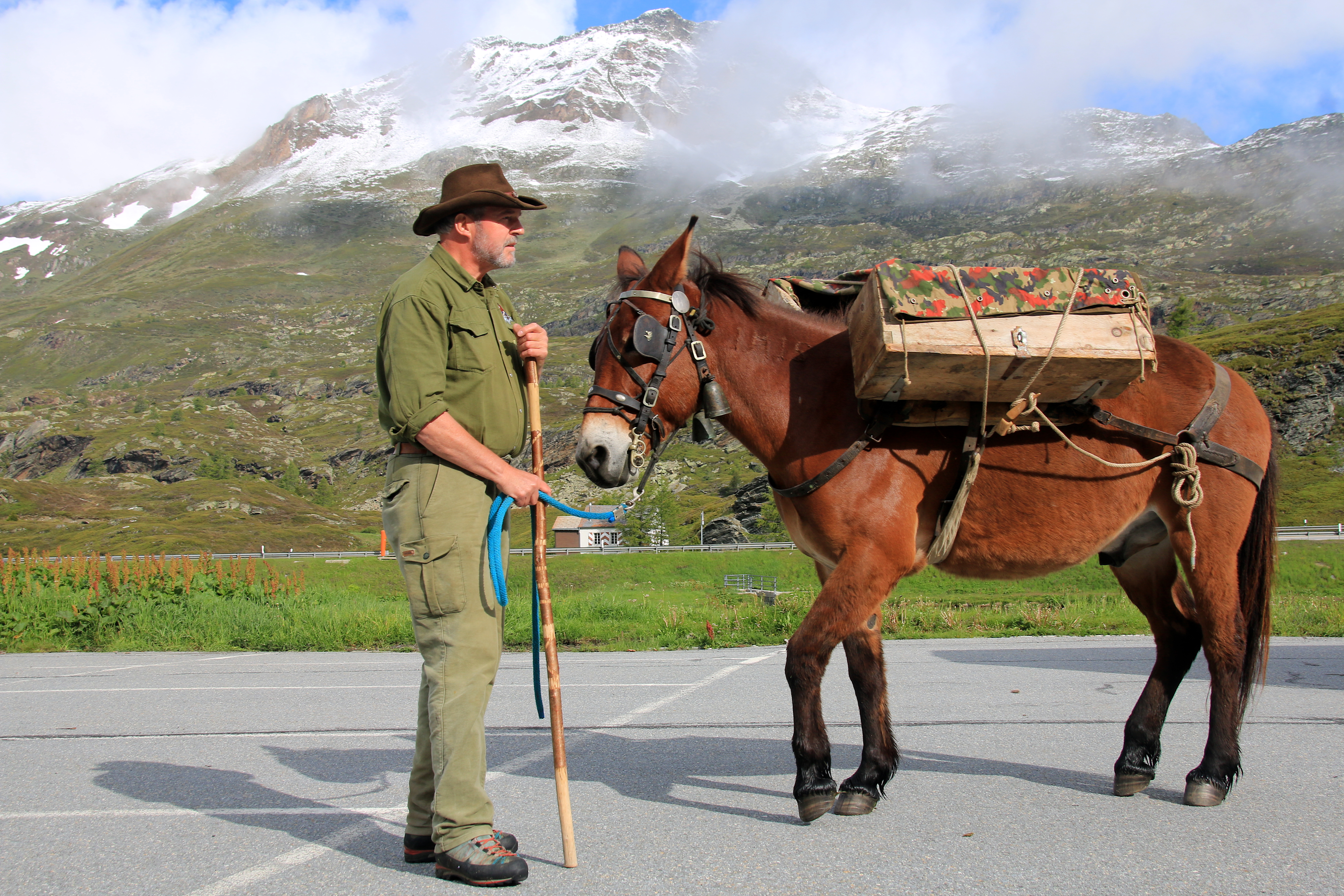
Pack animal on Simplon pass 2020

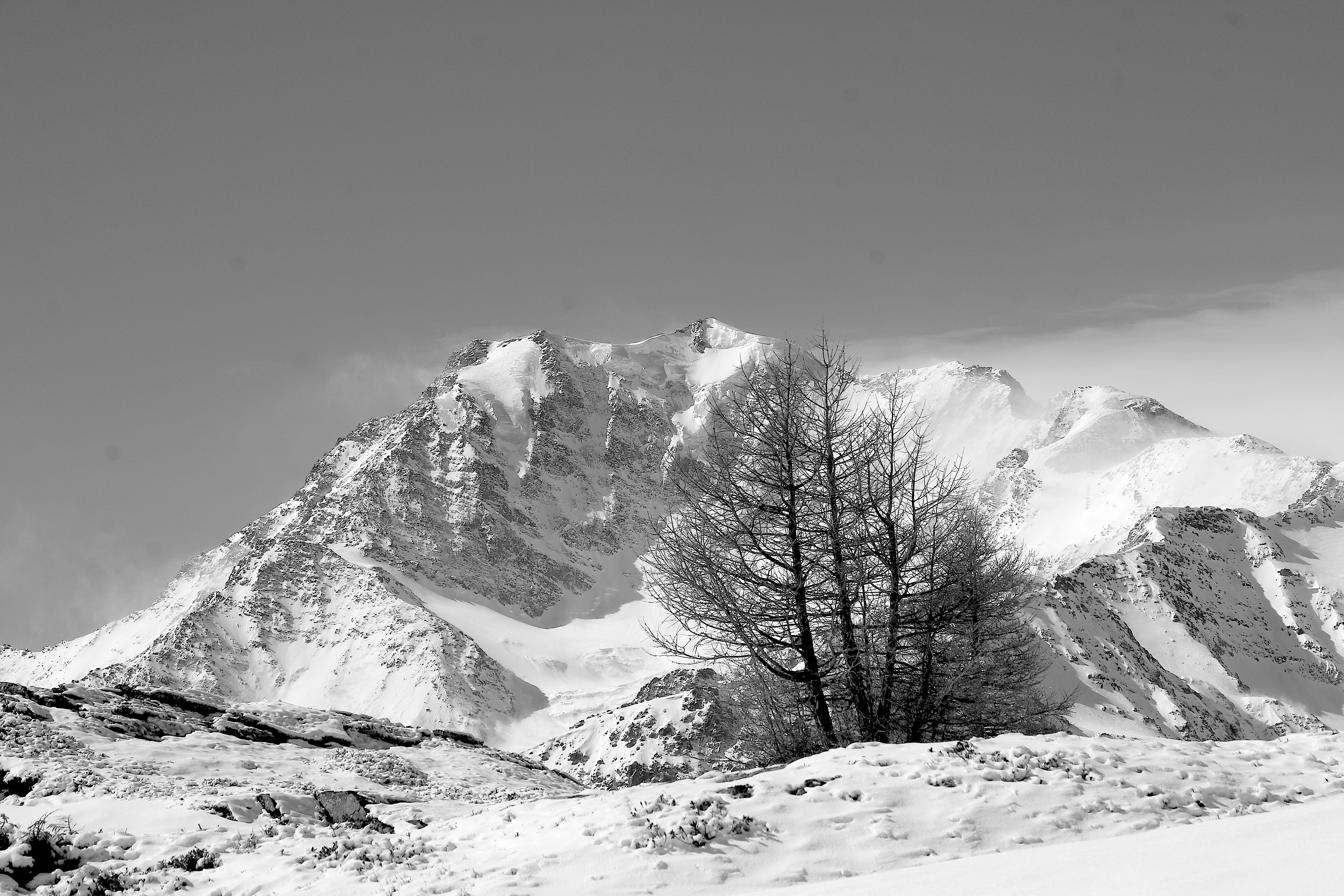
Mount Fletschhorn seen from Simplon pass

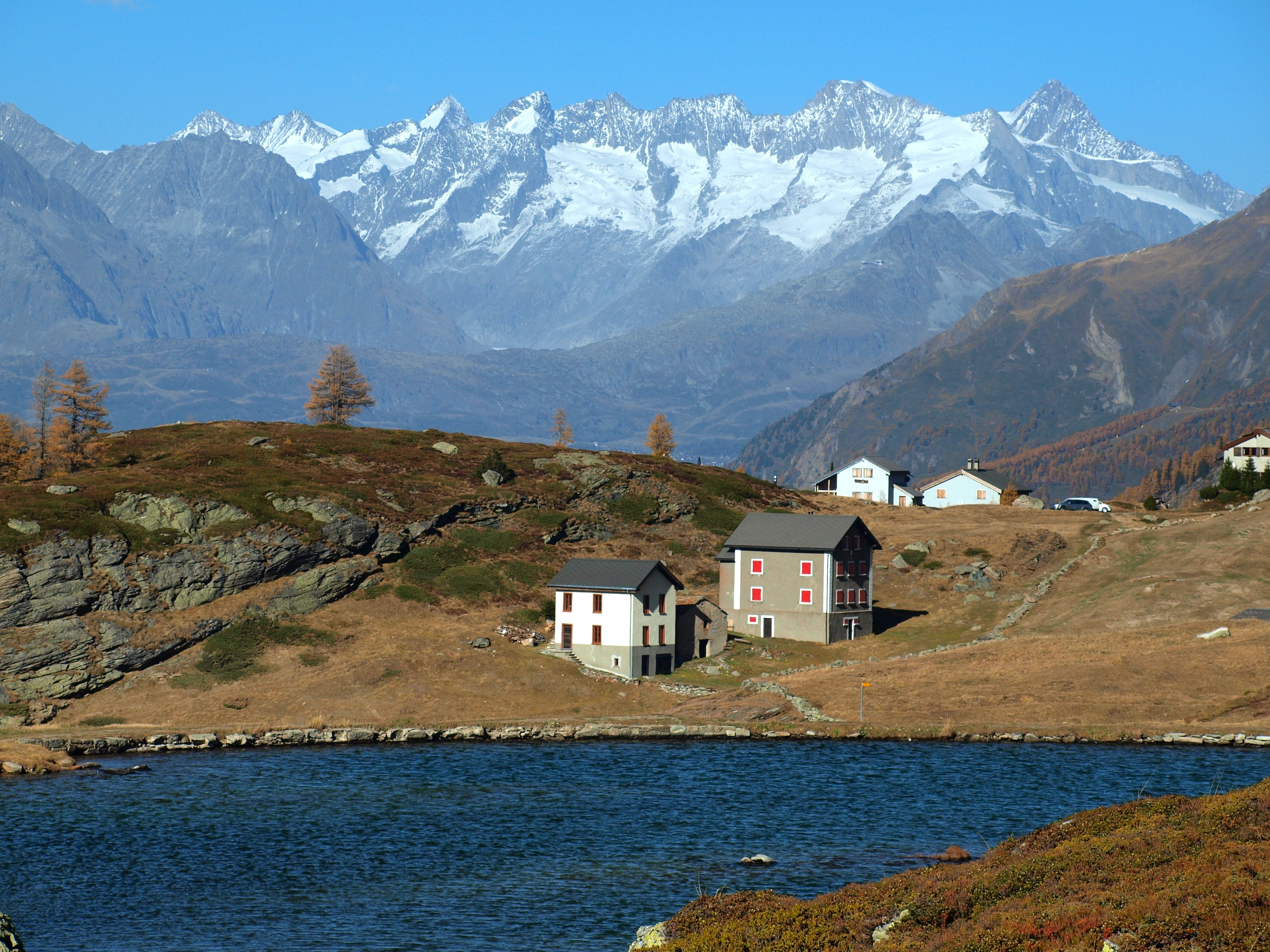
Rotelsee on Simplon Pass

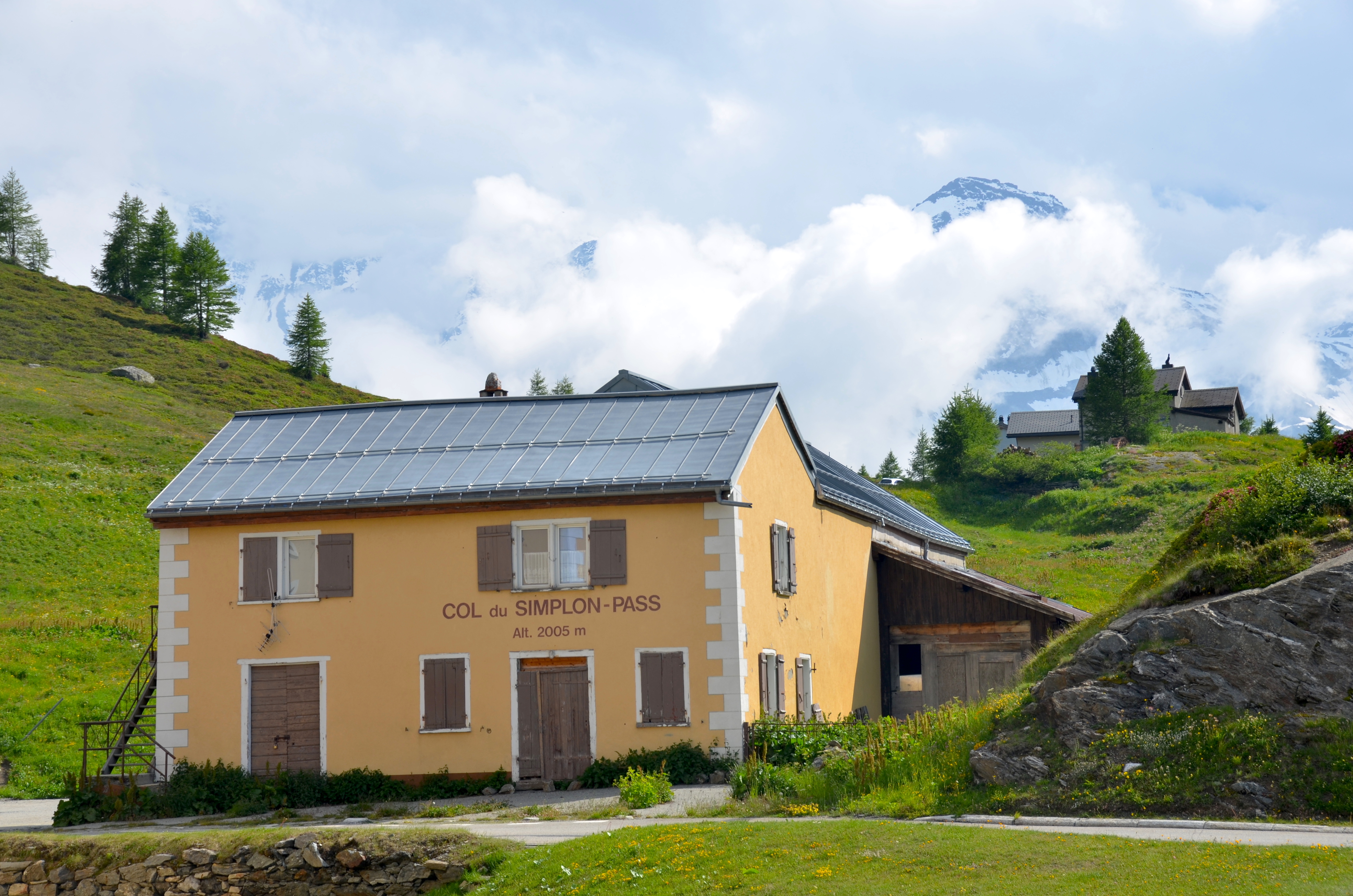
Col du Simplon

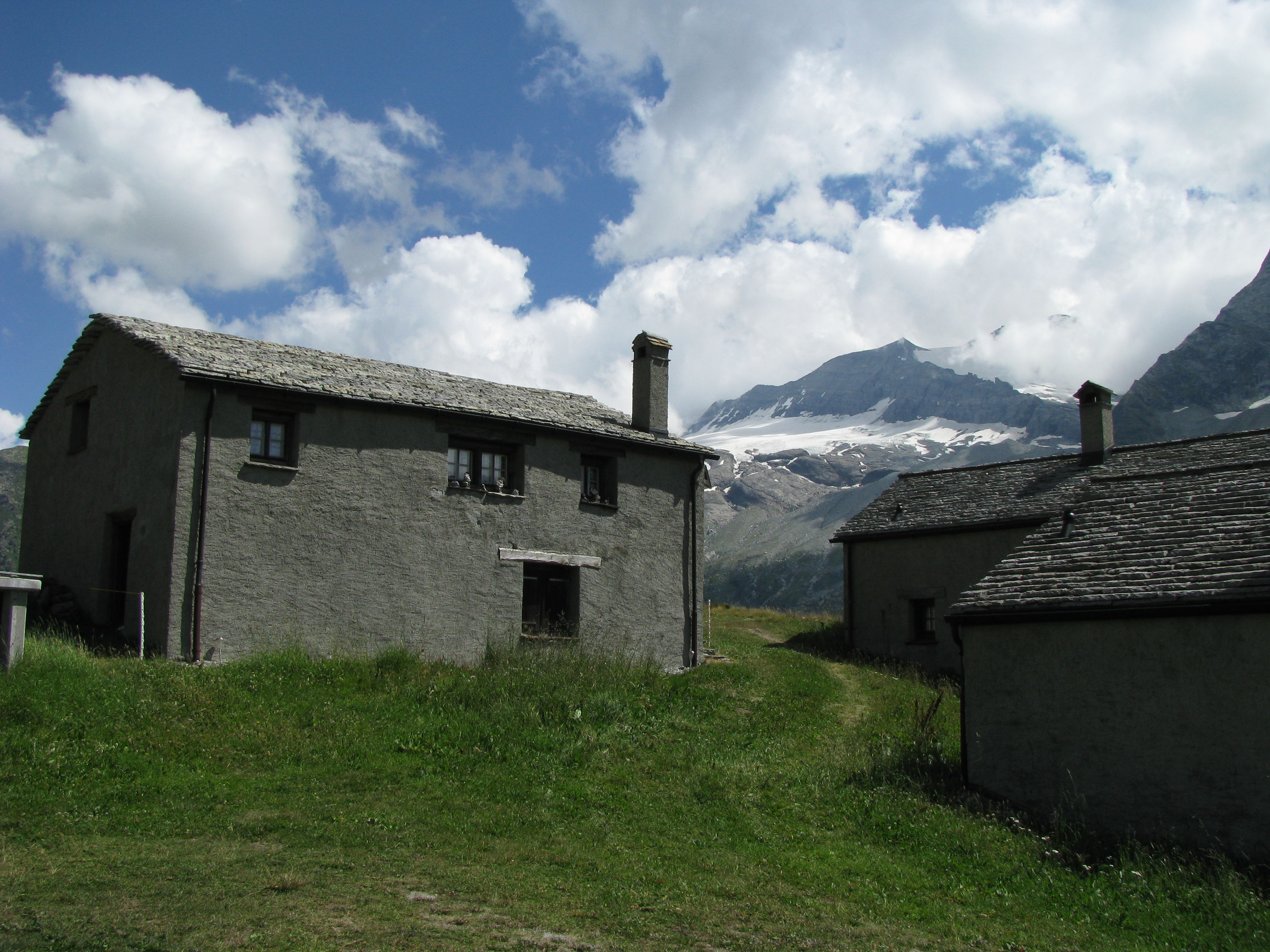
Scenery of the area

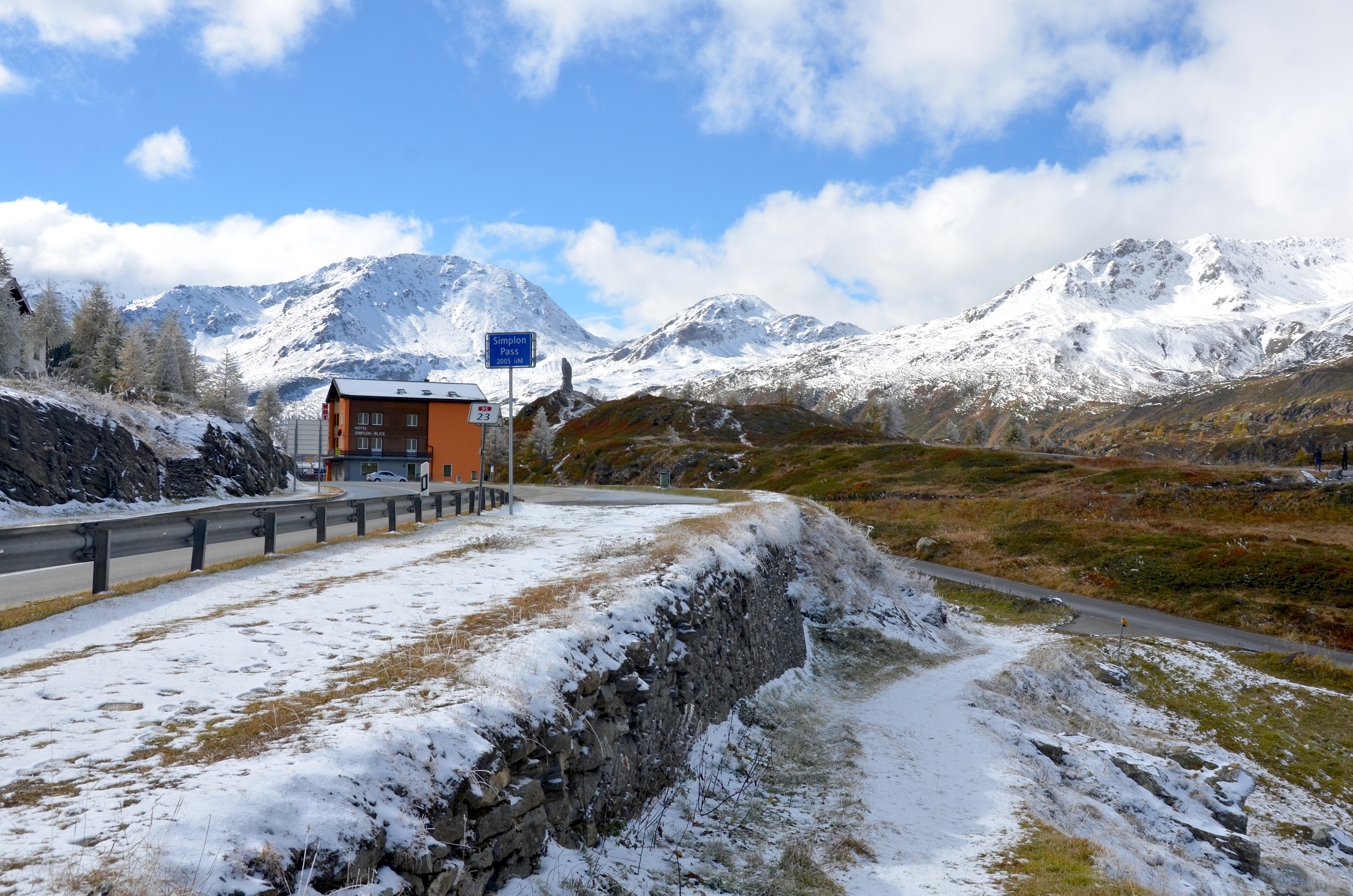
Retaining wall from Napoleon Road on summit of pass

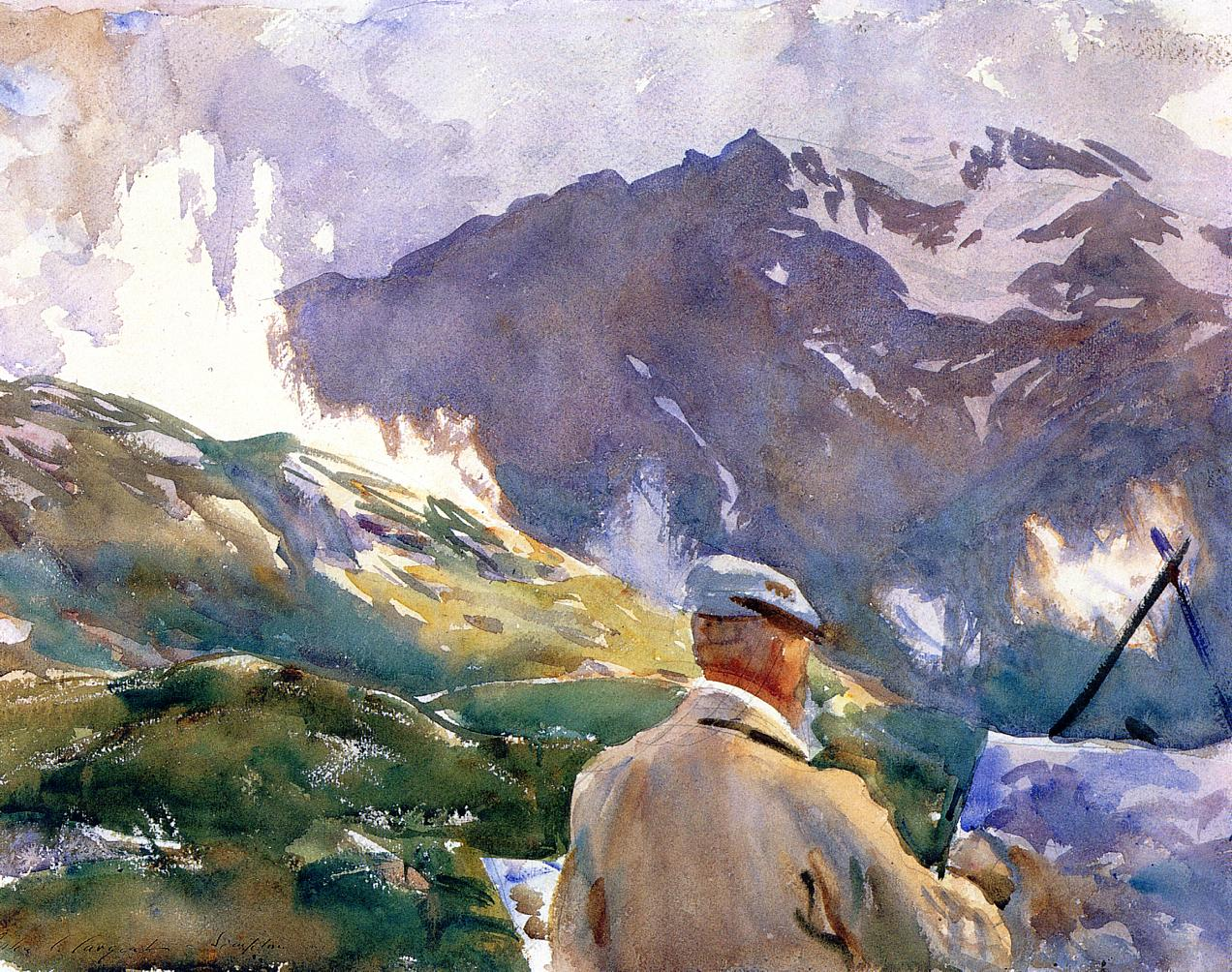
'Artist in the Simplon' by John Singer Sargent, 1909

== Maps ==
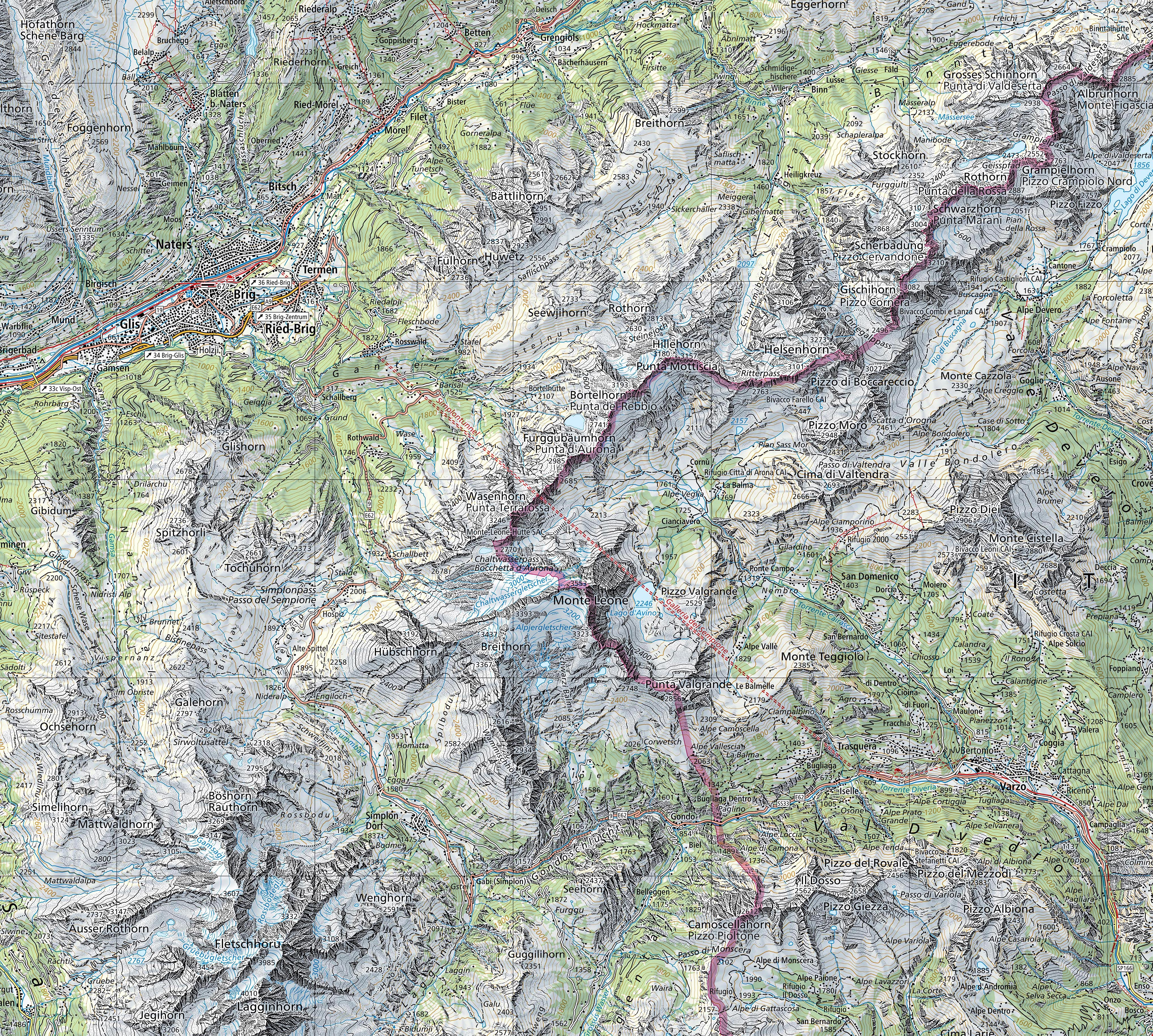
Swisstopo map of the Simplon Pass and Tunnel, connecting Brig in Valais with Domdossola in Piedmont. The thick red line demarks the Swiss-Italian border. Monte Leone is visible in the centre, the Simplon pass separates it in the Lepontine Alps in the east from the Pennine Alps in the west.

== Bibliography ==
- Nicola Pfund, Sui passi in bicicletta - Swiss Alpine passes by bicycle, Fontana Edizioni, 2012, p. 122-127. ISBN 978-88-8191-281-0
