= Monte Leone =

Mountain in Switzerland

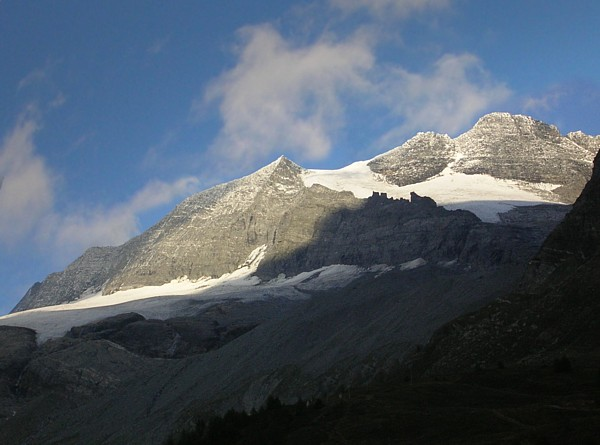
- Monte Leone seen from Simplon pass, August 2006

Highest point
- Elevation: 3,553 m (11,657 ft)
- Prominence: 1,144 m (3,753 ft)
- Parent peak: Dammastock
- Isolation: 11.7 km (7.3 mi)
- Listing: Alpine mountains above 3000 m
- Coordinates: 46°14′59″N 8°06′37″E

Geography
- Location within Alps
- Location: Valais, Switzerland / Piedmont, Italy
- Parent range: Lepontine Alps

Climbing
- First ascent: July 1859, by an unnamed Swiss officer

Monte Leone is the highest mountain of the Lepontine Alps and is located on the border between Switzerland and Italy. The mountain stands on the extreme west of the Lepontine Alps, a few kilometres east of Simplon Pass.

== Etymology ==
Leone in Italian means lion, and the mountain's name is said to come from the look of its south face's profile. A different origin of the name could be Munt d'l'Aiun, which in the local dialect means Aiun's mountain; Aione is a nearby village and Mount Leone is situated close to meadows traditionally owned by the villagers.

== Geography ==
In the SOIUSA (International Standardized Mountain Subdivision of the Alps) the mountain belongs to an alpine subsection of the Lepontine Alps called "North-Western Lepontine Alps" (It:Alpi del Monte Leone e del San Gottardo; De:Monte Leone-Sankt Gotthard-Alpen).

Monte Leone, seen from Alpe Veglia in August 2026.

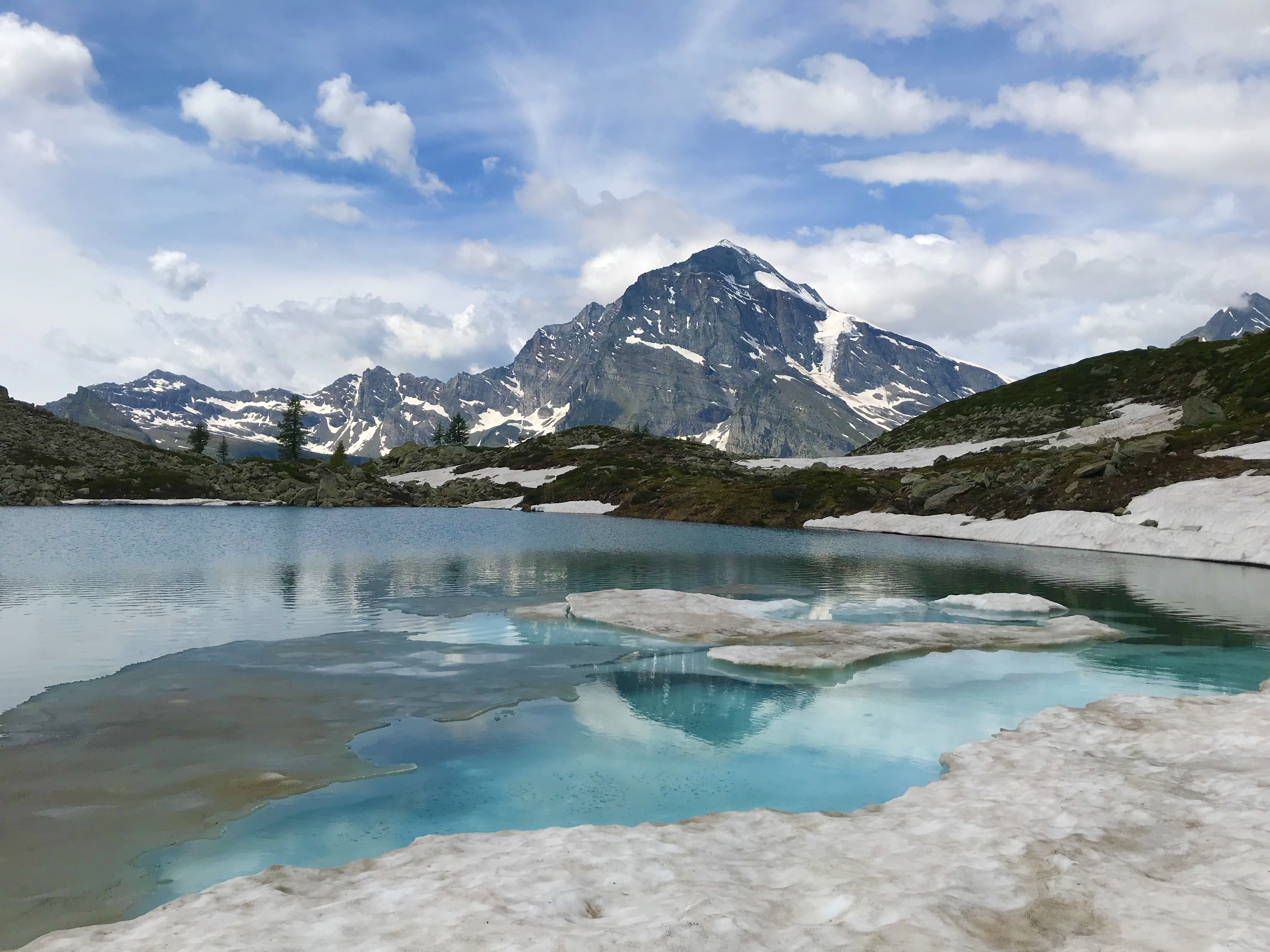
Monte Leone, with Lago Bianco in front, July 2019.

== See also ==
- List of mountains of Valais
- List of mountains of Switzerland
- List of most isolated mountains of Switzerland
