= Hohsaas Hut =

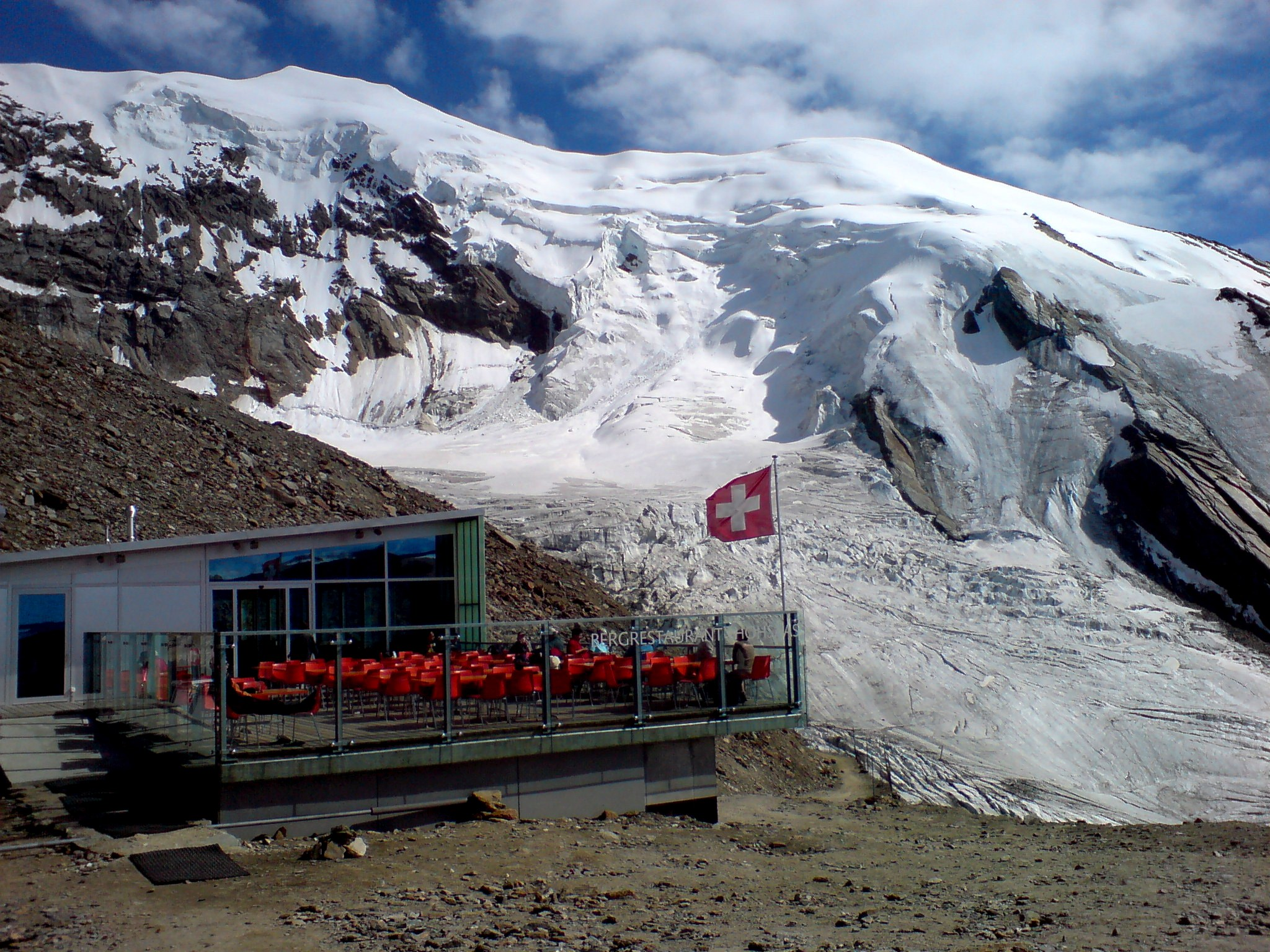
- The Hohsaas Hut with the Weissmies in the background.
- Interactive map of the Hohsaas Hut area

General information
- Location: West side of the Lagginhorn
- Coordinates: 46.13929°N 7.99165°E
- Elevation: 3,140 m (10,300 ft)
- Year built: 2006
- Owner: Private

Website
- www.hohsaashuette.ch

The Hohsaas hut is a private refuge on the west side of Lagginhorn and Weissmies in Valais, directly at the mountain station of the Saas-Grund–Hohsaas cable car.

The valley town is Saas-Grund. Access to the hut can be significantly shortened by taking a cable car ride from Saas-Grund to the Kreuzboden station (approximately 2,400 m above the sea) or Hohsaas (3,141 m above the sea).

The Hohsaas Hut is a base for access to the Fletschhorn, the Lagginhorn and the Weissmies via the Trift Glacier as well as the Jegihorn and the Jegigrat.

It was converted from a mountain hut to a restaurant in 2006.

== Access ==
- By cable car from Saas-Grund to Hohsaas
- From the Kreuzboden cable car mid-station: 741 m elevation gain, 2–2.5 hours
- From Saas-Grund: 1573 m elevation gain, 4–5 hours

== Mountains ==
- Weissmies (4,013m):
  - Normal route: NW flank, WS−, predominantly glacier route, out and back or as a traverse to the Almageller Hut
  - North Ridge: Via the Lagginjoch, ZS+, complete route between rock and ice, with descent via the normal route
- Lagginhorn (4,010m):
  - Normal route: WSW ridge, WS, predominantly rock
  - South Ridge: Via the Lagginjoch, ZS−, rocky ridge and descent via the normal route
- Fletschhorn (3,985m): Several routes
- Jegihorn (3,206m): Several routes

== Nearby huts ==
- Weissmies Hut
- Laggin Bivouac

== Bibliography ==
- Schweizerisches Bundesamt für Landestopografie (2017): Landeskarte der Schweiz 1:25'000 – Saas, Blatt 1329
- Schweizerisches Bundesamt für Landestopografie (2019): Landeskarte der Schweiz 1:25'000 – Saas-Fee, Blatt 2526
- Schweizerisches Bundesamt für Landestopografie (2019): Landeskarte der Schweiz 1:33'333 – Siplon, Mischabel, Blatt 3319T
- Schweizerisches Bundesamt für Landestopografie (2019): Landeskarte der Schweiz 1:50'000 – Matterhorn, Mischabel, Blatt 5006
