= Weissmies Hut =

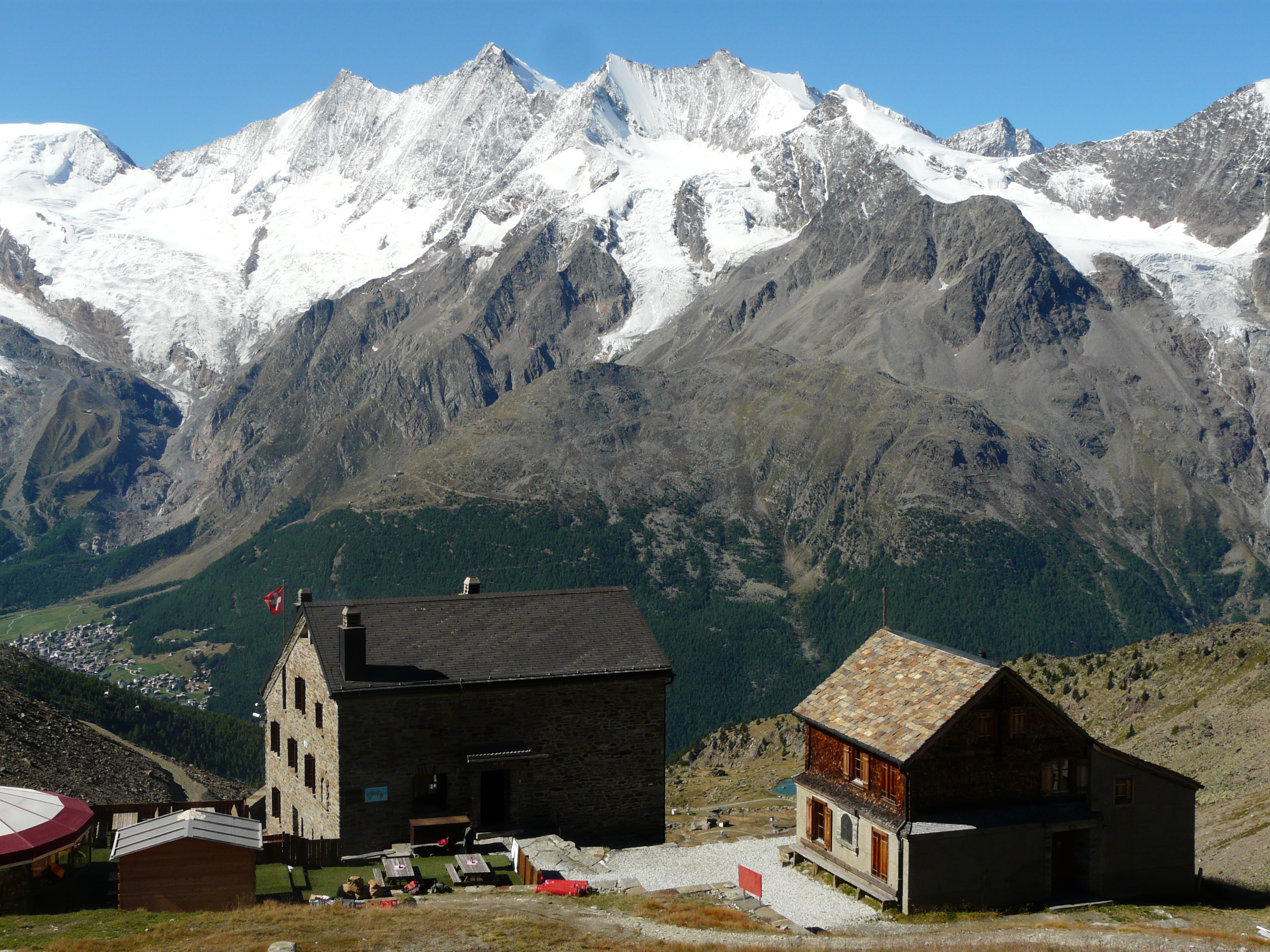
- The Weissmies Hut looking west across the Saastal to Dom and the Mischabel group.
- Interactive map of the Weissmies Hut area

General information
- Location: West side of the Lagginhorn; Canton of Valais, Switzerland
- Coordinates: 46.143863°N 7.977901°E
- Elevation: 2,726 m (8,944 ft)
- Year built: 1894
- Owner: SAC section Olten

Website
- weissmieshuette.ch

The Weissmies Hut (2726m) is a mountain hut belonging to the Olten section of the Swiss Alpine Club (SAC) on the west side of the Lagginhorn in Valais. Together with the old hut directly adjacent, they are also referred to as the Weissmies Huts. In 1894, the old Weissmies Hut was built as the Weissmies Hotel. It was acquired by the Olten section of the SAC in 1924 and operated with 50 beds. A new hut was built right next door in 1960. The huts are used by mountaineers in the summer, and the new hut is used by skiers in the winter.

The valley town is Saas-Grund. The approach to the hut can be significantly shortened by taking a cable car ride from Saas Grund to the Kreuzboden station (approximately 2,400 m above sea level) or Hohsaas (3,141 m). Difficulty level T2.

The Weissmies Hut is a base camp for the ascent to the Fletschhorn, the Lagginhorn, and the Weissmies via the Trift Glacier, as well as the Jegihorn and Jegigrat. From the hut, the Saas-Fee mountain range can be viewed.

The hut sleeps 125 and is generally open from mid-June to late September.

== Nearby Huts ==
- Hohsaas Hut
- Laggin Bivouac

== Bibliography ==
- Michael Waeber: Walliser Alpen, Bergverlag Rother 1993, ISBN 3-7633-2408-9
- Schweizerisches Bundesamt für Landestopografie (2007): Landeskarte der Schweiz 1:25.000 - Simplon, Blatt 1309
- Romelli, Marco; Cividini, Valentino (2019). 4000m Peaks of the Alps. Normal and Classic Routes. Idea Montagna (Editoria E Alpinismo). ISBN 978-88-85468-53-5.
