= Rothorn =

The name Rothorn (German for Red Peak) is a common name for summits in the Alps. It may refer to:

== Austria ==
In Carinthia

- Rothorn (2621 m) in the Kreuzeck group

In Salzburg

- Rothorn (2522 m) in the Niedere Tauern

In Tyrol

- Großer Rothorn (2403 m) in the Loferer Steinberge
- Rothornspitze (2393 m) in the Allgäu Alps

In Vorarlberg

- Formarin Rothorn (2481 m) in the Lechquellen Range near the Rote Wand
- Rothorn (2239 m) in the Lechquellen Range

== Switzerland ==
In Graubünden Rhaetian Alps:

- Radüner Rothorn (3022 m) in the Albula Alps
- Aroser Rothorn (2980 m) highest peak of the Plessur Range
- Parpaner Rothorn (2861 m) east of Lenzerheide in the Plessur Range
- Furna Rothorn (2362 m) in the Plessur Range

Bernese Alps:

- Finsteraarrothorn (3530 m) SE of the Finsteraarhorn (Valais)
- Oberaarrothorn (3463 m) east of the Finsteraarhorn (Bern/Valais)
- Ferdenrothorn (3180 m) near the Lötschen Pass (Valais)
- Faldum Rothorn (2832 m) south of Ferdenrothorn (Valais)
- Diemtigtaler Rothorn (2405 m) east of Zweisimmen
- Sigriswiler Rothorn (2046 m) above Lake Thun

Emmental Alps:

- Brienzer Rothorn (2350 m), on the border of the cantons of Bern, Lucerne and Obwalden

Lepontine Alps:

- Siedel Rothorn (3287 m) above the Griesgletscher (Valais /Piedmont)
- Rothorn/Punta della Rossa (2888 m) (Valais /Piedmont)
- Rothorn (2808 m) above the Steinujoch (Valais)

Pennine Alps:

- Zinalrothorn (4221 m) (Valais)
- Inner Rothorn (3455) and Äusser Rothorn (3147 m) above Saas Balen in the Fletschhorn massif (Valais)
- Oberrothorn (3415 m) and Unterrothorn (3103 m), near Zermatt (Valais)
- Rothorn (3277 m) north of the Barrhorn (Valais)
- Monte Rothorn (3152 m) south of Castor (Aosta Valley, Italy)

Uri Alps:

- Rothorn (OW) (2526 m) soars above Gental (BE), Melchsee-Frutt (OW) and Mägisalp (BE)
