= Senggchuppa =

Mountain in Switzerland

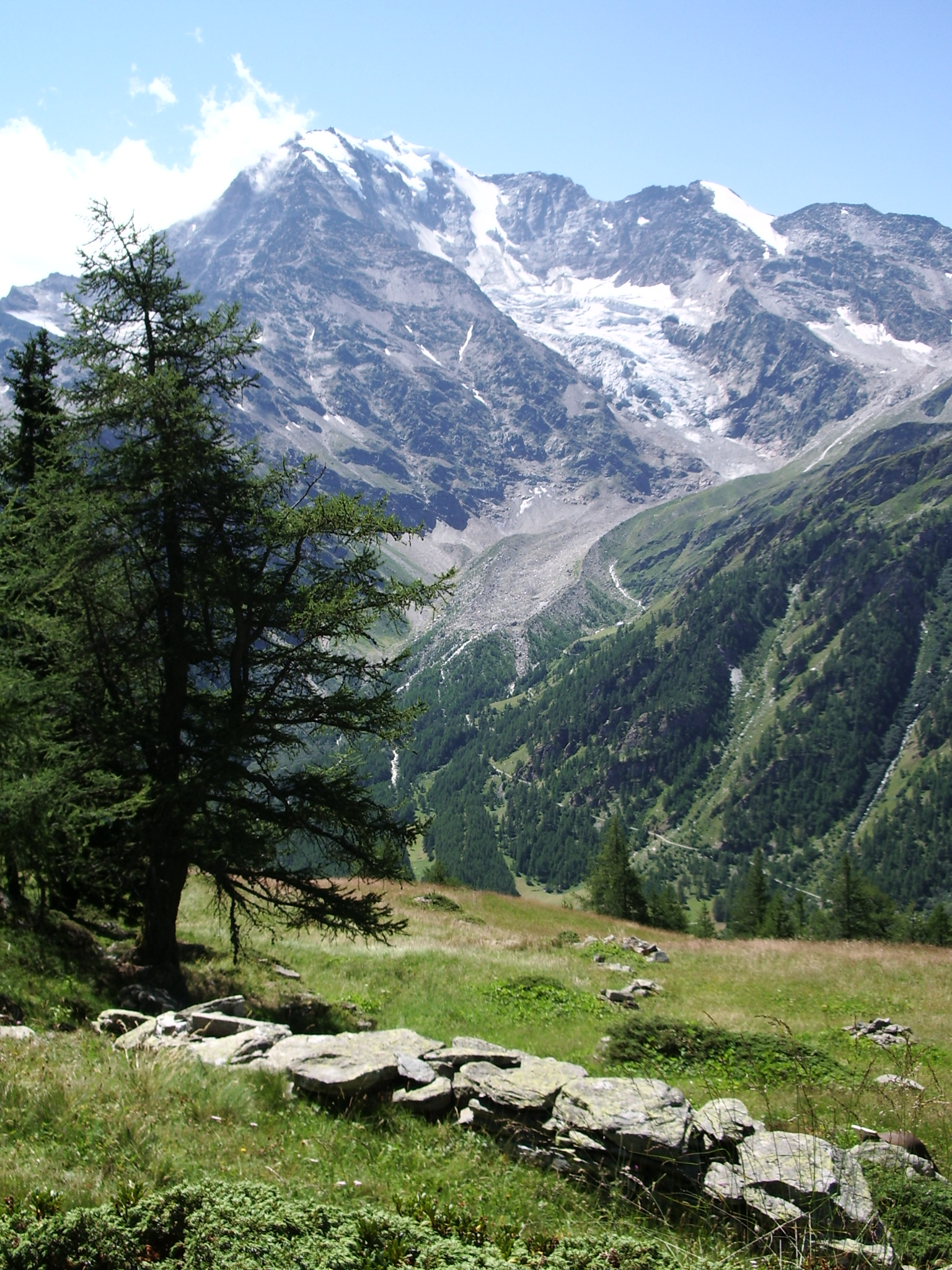
- The Fletschhorn and the Senggchuppa (right)

Highest point
- Elevation: 3,607 m (11,834 ft)
- Prominence: 26 m (85 ft)
- Parent peak: Lagginhorn
- Coordinates: 46°10′45.4″N 7°59′43.6″E

Geography
- Location within Switzerland
- Location: Valais, Switzerland
- Parent range: Pennine Alps

The Senggchuppa is a mountain of the Swiss Pennine Alps, located south of the Simplon Pass in the canton of Valais. It lies north of the Fletschhorn-Lagginhorn-Weissmies group, the range lying between the Saastal and the Val Divedro.

The northern side of the mountain is covered by a glacier named Mattwaldgletscher.
