= Mattwaldhorn =

Mountain in Switzerland

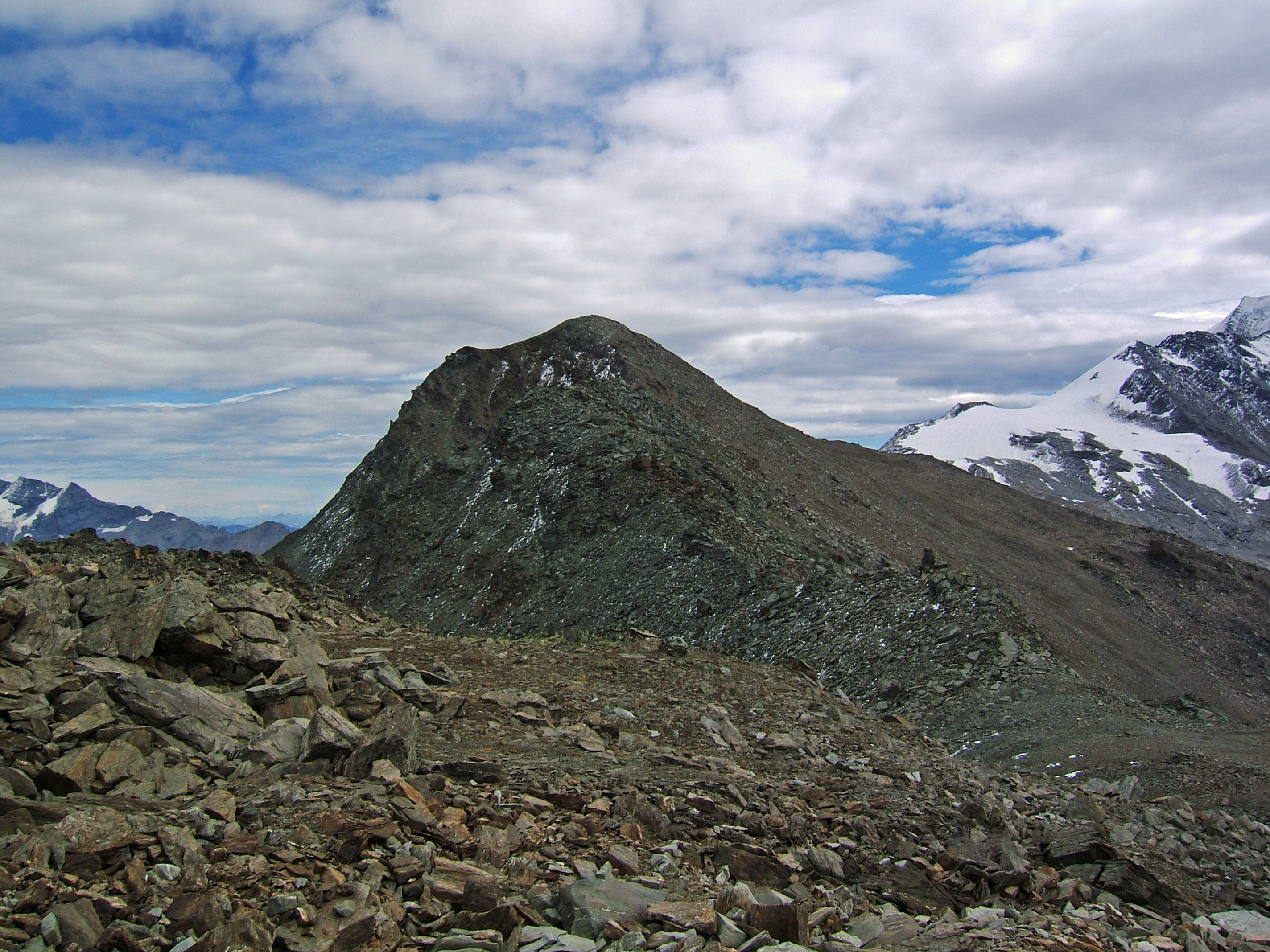
- View of the Mattwaldhorn with the Senggchuppa on the right

Highest point
- Elevation: 3,246 m (10,650 ft)
- Prominence: 223 m (732 ft)
- Parent peak: Weissmies
- Coordinates: 46°11′55.5″N 7°57′15.6″E

Geography
- Location within Switzerland
- Location: Valais, Switzerland
- Parent range: Pennine Alps

The Mattwaldhorn is a mountain of the Swiss Pennine Alps, located between the upper Nanztal and the Saastal in the canton of Valais. The nearest locality is Eisten on the west side.
