= Laggin Bivouac =

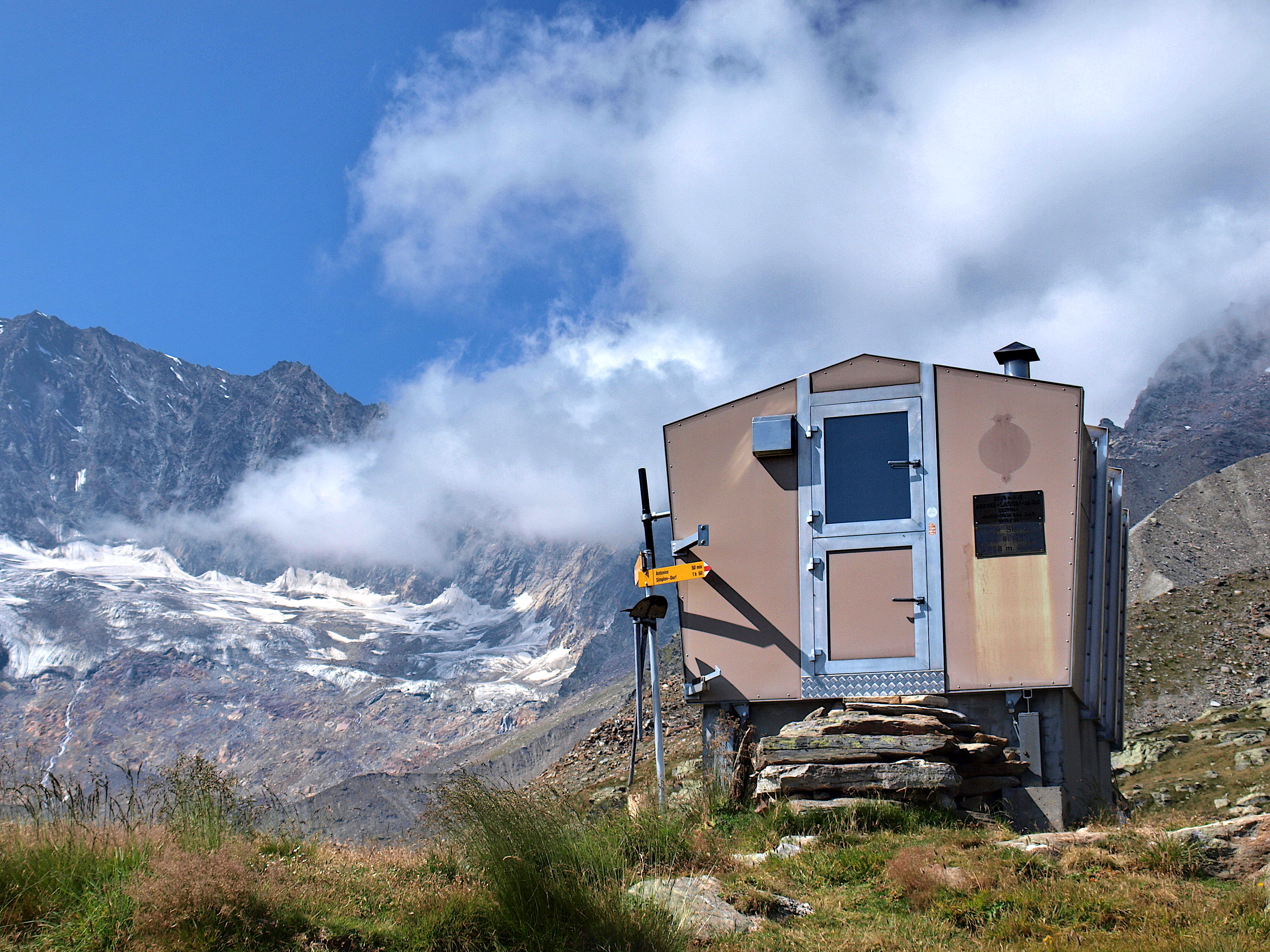
- The Laggin Bivouac looking west with the Lagginhorn and Weissmies in the background.
- Interactive map of the Laggin Bivouac area

General information
- Coordinates: 46.164472°N 8.045291°E
- Elevation: 2,428 m (7,966 ft)
- Year built: 1958/59
- Owner: SAC Monte Rosa

Website
- www.section-monte-rosa.ch/de/unsere-hutten/lagginbiwak

The Laggin Bivouac (German: Lagginbiwak) is an unmanned bivouac box of the Monte Rosa section of the Swiss Alpine Club and is located on the east side of Fletschhorn and Lagginhorn.

== History ==
The first Laggin bivouac was built in 1958/1959 at 2,752 m and destroyed by a landslide on March 31, 1981. The current bivouac was opened on September 14, 1983.

== Access ==
- From Gabi 1320 elevation gain, 4.0 hrs.

== Nearby huts ==
- Weissmies Hut
- Almageller Hut
- Hohsaas Hut

== Mountains ==
- Fletschhorn 3985 m
- Lagginhorn 4010 m
- Tällihorn 3448 m

== Maps ==
- Landeskarte Schweiz LK50 274 VISP (1:50.000)
- Landeskarte Schweiz LK25 309 Simplon (1:25.000)
