= Inner Rothorn =

Mountain in Switzerland

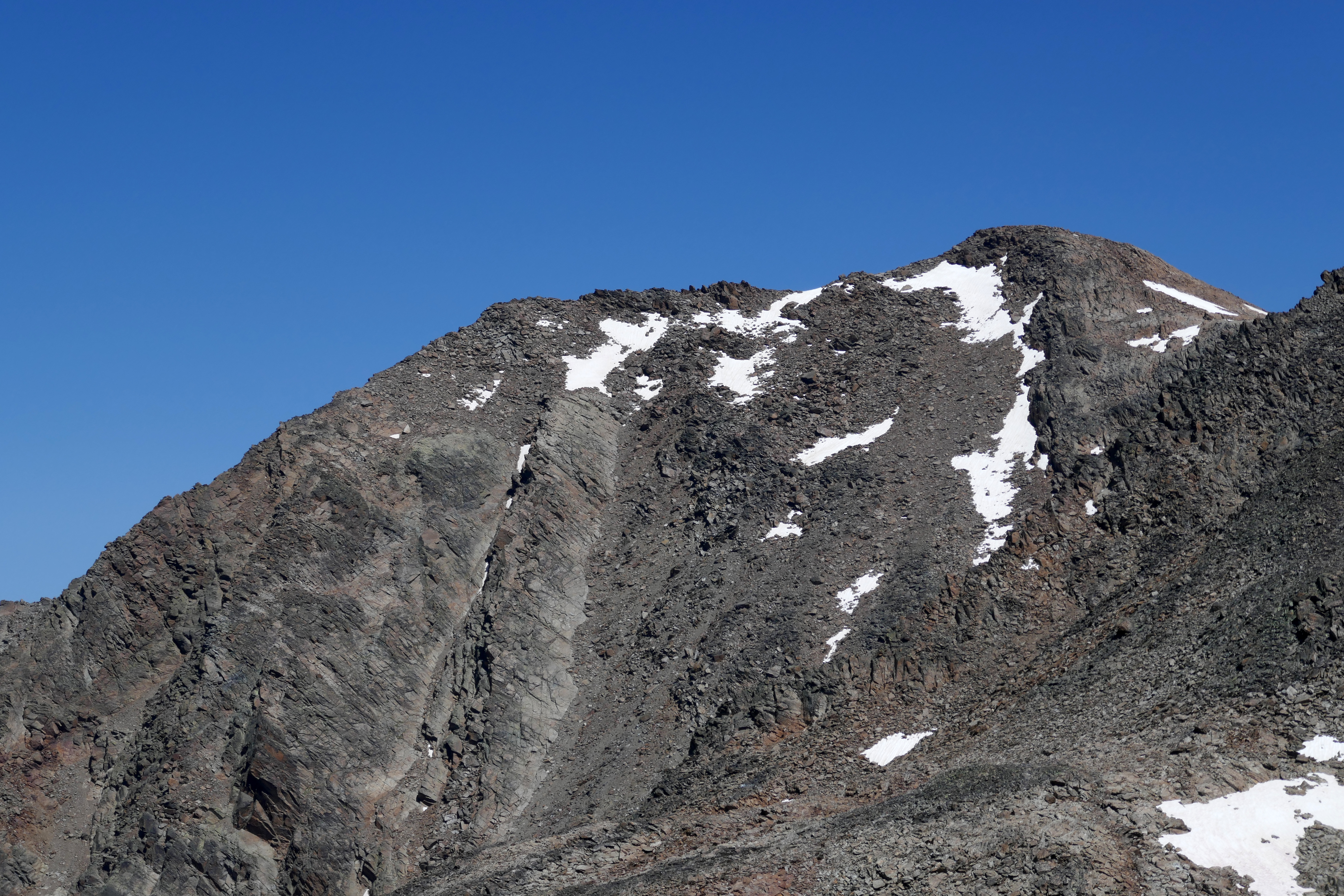

Highest point
- Elevation: 3,455 m (11,335 ft)
- Prominence: 40 m (130 ft)
- Coordinates: 46°9′49.2″N 7°58′52.7″E

Geography
- Location within Switzerland
- Location: Valais, Switzerland
- Parent range: Pennine Alps

The Inner Rothorn is a mountain of the Swiss Pennine Alps, overlooking Saas-Balen in the canton of Valais. It lies on the ridge descending from the Fletschhorn, which ends at the Jegihorn.

According to the Swiss Alpine Club's route archive, all ascents come with an F difficulty (facile).
