= Simplon Valley =

Coordinates: 46°11′49″N 8°09′07″E

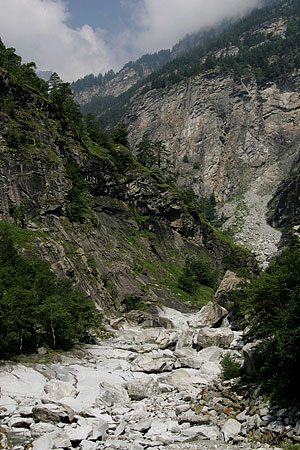
View from the gorge of Gondo

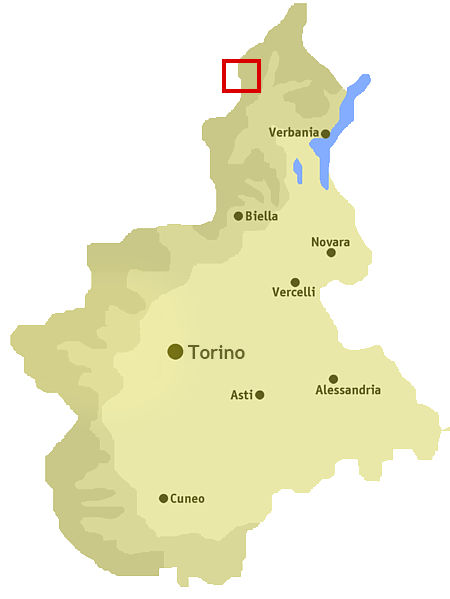
Val Divedro/Simplontal in Piedmont

The Simplon Valley or Divedro Valley (German: Simplontal, Italian: Val Divedro) is a valley of the Alps, situated between the Pennine and the Lepontine ranges. The valley is drained by the Diveria or Chrummbach, a tributary of the Toce at Crevoladossola. The Simplon Valley is the only valley of Valais located south of the main chain of the Alps.

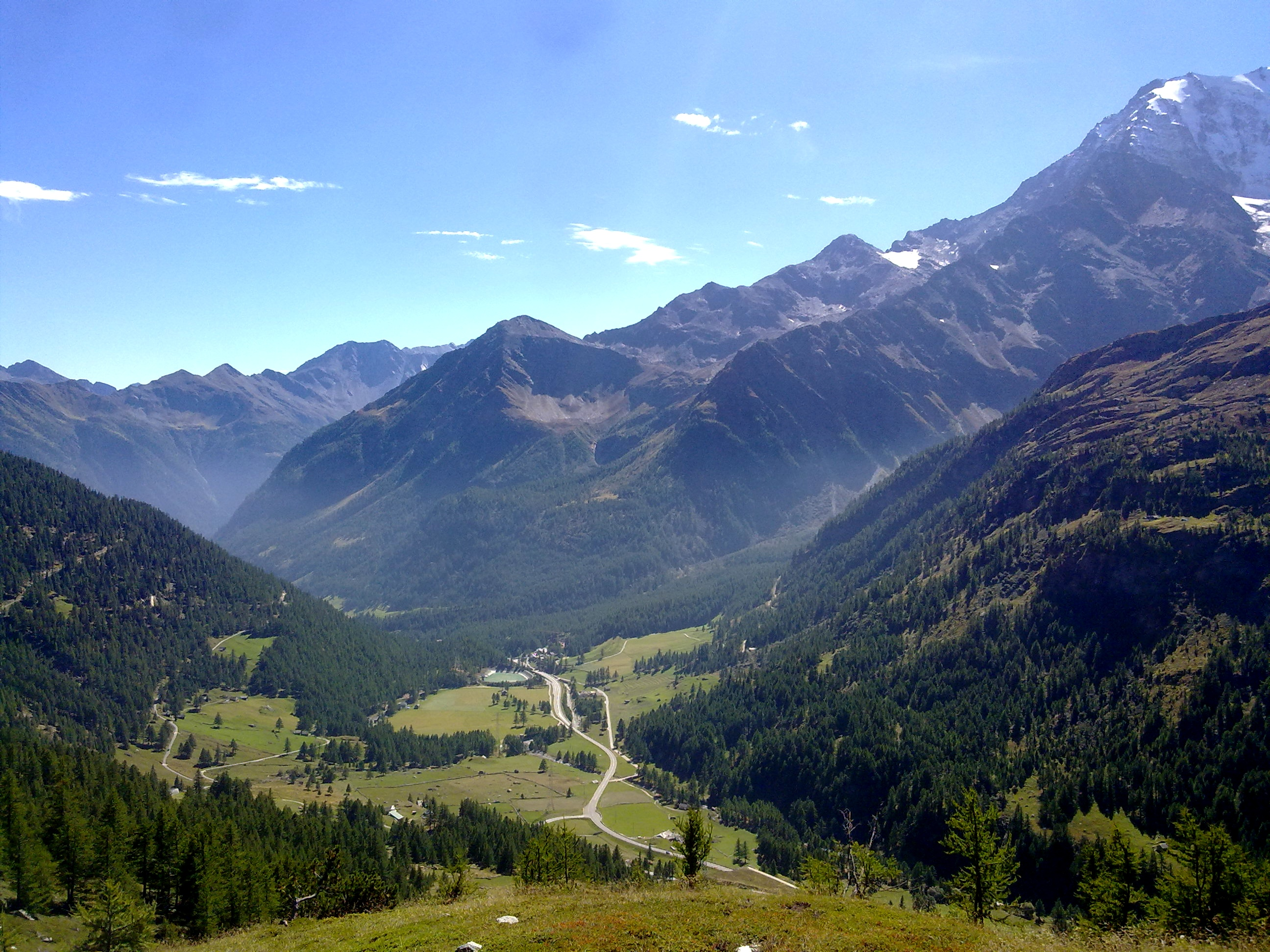
View of the upper valley with the Fletschhorn (right)

The highest mountains in the valley are the Weissmies (4,017 m), the Lagginhorn (4,010 m) and the Fletschhorn (3,993 m), all in the Pennine Alps. On the other side (Lepontine Alps), the highest summit is Monte Leone (3,553 m). The most important pass in the valley is the Simplon, connecting Brig to Domodossola.

The valley is politically divided between Switzerland and Italy. The upper western part belongs to the Swiss canton of Valais and the lower eastern part belongs to the Italian region of Piedmont. The international border runs from the Camoscellahorn to Monte Leone, reaching an altitude of 800 metres at valley floor.

The main localities are Simplon, Gondo (Switzerland), Iselle, Trasquera and Varzo (Italy).
