= Johann Josef Imseng =

Priest in the Saastal (1806–1869)

Johann Josef Imseng (6 June 1806 in Saas-Fee; † 5 July 1869 in Saas-Almagell) was a priest in the Saastal, an alpinist and the first skier in Switzerland.

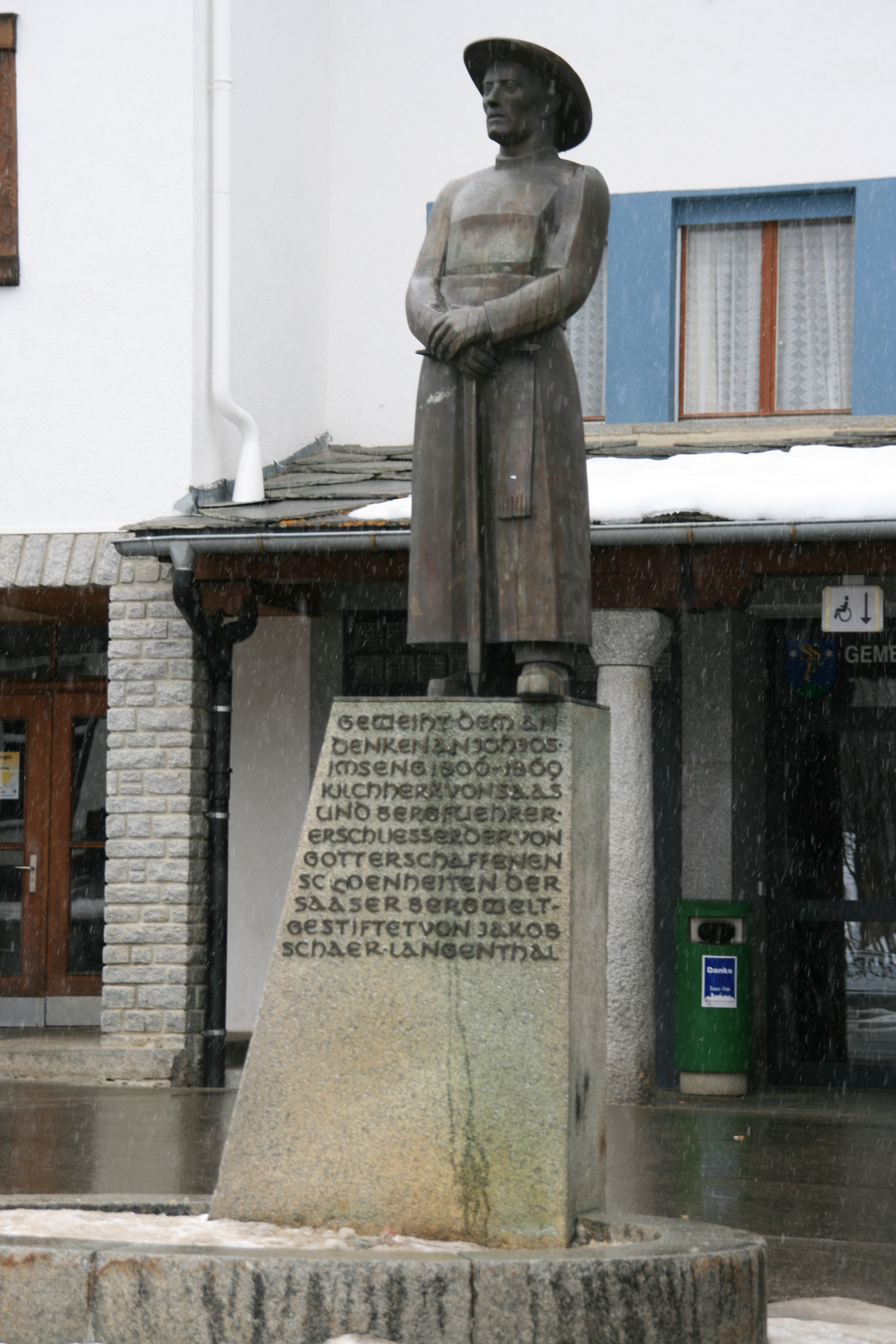
Imseng monument on the village square of Saas Fee.

During his life, Imseng was a pioneer and promoter of the emerging tourism industry. He hosted tourists in his rectory, led mountain tours, and championed the construction of hotels. On his advice, the first hotels in the Saas Valley were built in the mid-19th century. On December 20, 1849, Imseng skied from Saas-Fee to Saas-Grund on self-made wooden planks so he could provide faster assistance to a dying man. The planks were attached to his shoes with straps and cords. His ski descent was the first in Switzerland. The mountaineering priest drowned in Lake Mattmark in 1869. A statue commemorates him in Saas-Fee's village square. From there, Imseng overlooks the Hotel Dom, the oldest hotel in the village; it was built in 1881, partly on his initiative.

The story of his first ascent of the Lagginhorn is told in Ball (1860). It appears as though he completed the climb from the valley floor to the summit (some 2500m) and back in a single day, whilst dressed in some form of his clerical robes.

== First ascents ==
- Lagginhorn, 4010 m a.s.l., with Franz-Josef Andenmatten and Edward Levi Ames (26 August 1856)

== Bibliography ==
- Adolf Fux: Der Kilchherr von Saas. (Ein Tatsachenroman aus der Walliser Bergwelt). Bern: Hallwag 1959, ISBN 3-85883015-1.
- Imseng, Johann Josef in German, French and Italian in the online Historical Dictionary of Switzerland.
- Otto Supersaxo: Im Saastal zu Hause. Visp: Rotten-Verlag 1994, ISBN 3907816242, S. 62–65.
- Ball, John (1860). Peaks, Passes, and Glaciers: A Series of Excursions by Members of the Alpine Club. London: Longman.
