= Camoscellahorn =

Mountain in Switzerland

- Pizzo Pioltone
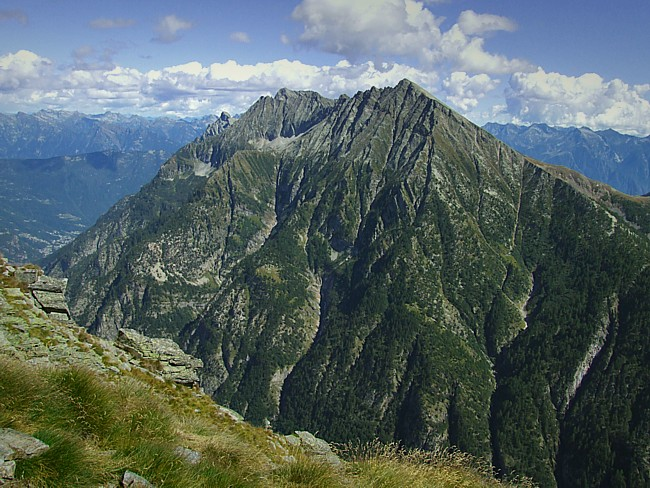
- The north west side

Highest point
- Elevation: 2,612 m (8,570 ft)
- Prominence: 183 m (600 ft)
- Parent peak: Pizzo Giezza
- Coordinates: 46°10′29.9″N 8°9′34.8″E

Geography
- Location within Alps
- Location: Valais, Switzerland / Piedmont, Italy
- Parent range: Pennine Alps

The Camoscellahorn (also known as Pizzo Pioltone) is a mountain of the Pennine Alps, located on the Swiss-Italian border. The closest locality is Gondo in the Swiss Val Divedro.
