= Zwischbergen Pass =

Mountain pass in the Pennine Alps, Valais, Switzerland

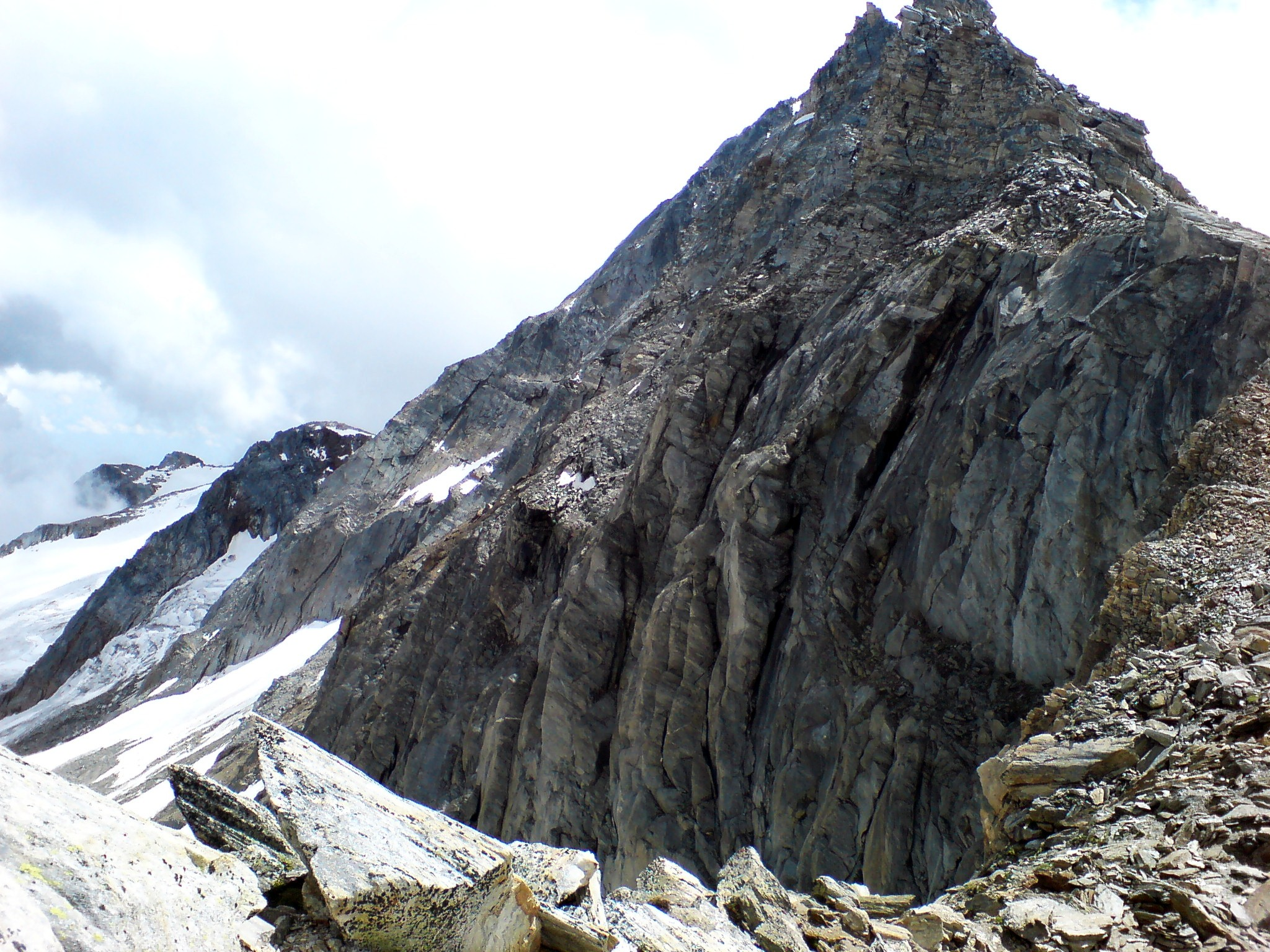
- View toward Portjengrat from the pass
- Interactive map of Zwischbergen Pass
- Elevation: 3,268 metres (10,722 ft)
- Traversed by: Trail (small glacier)

Third Approach
- Location: Switzerland
- Range: Alps
- Coordinates: 46°06′54″N 8°01′12″E

The Zwischbergen Pass (el. 3268 m.) (German: Zwischbergenpass) is a high mountain pass across the eastern Pennine Alps, connecting Saas Almagell and Zwischbergen in the canton of Valais in Switzerland.

The pass lies between the Weissmies on the north and Portjengrat on the South.

== See also ==
- List of mountain passes in Switzerland
