= Jegihorn =

Mountain in Switzerland

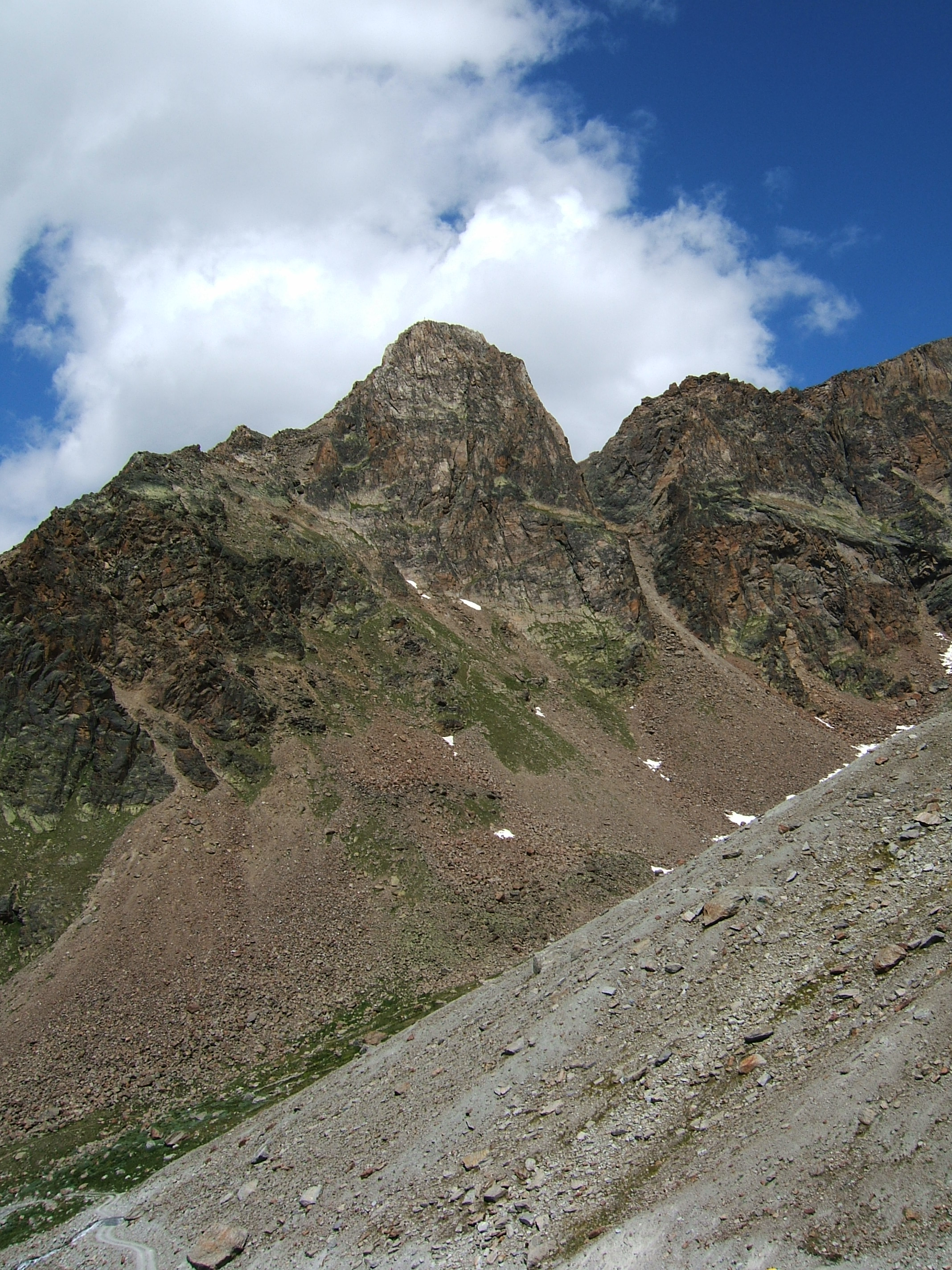
- Jegihorn from southeast, from Weissmies Hut

Highest point
- Elevation: 3,206 m (10,518 ft)
- Prominence: 113 m (371 ft)
- Parent peak: Weissmies
- Coordinates: 46°9′6″N 7°58′13″E

Geography
- Location within Switzerland
- Location: Valais, Switzerland
- Parent range: Pennine Alps

The Jegihorn is a mountain of the Swiss Pennine Alps, overlooking Saas-Balen in the canton of Valais. It is located west of the Lagginhorn.
