= Äusser Rothorn =

Mountain in Switzerland

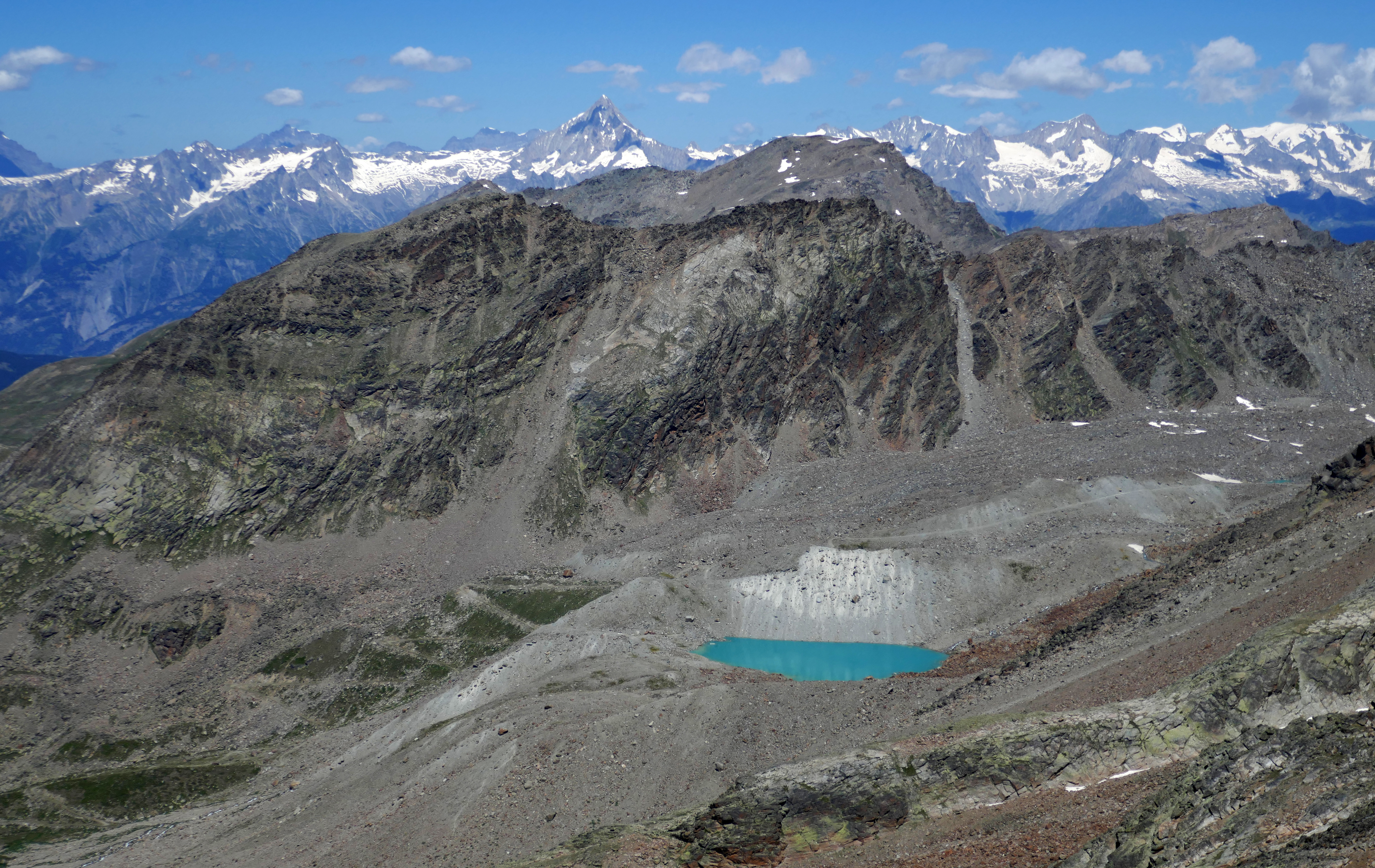

Highest point
- Elevation: 3,147 m (10,325 ft)
- Prominence: 42 m (138 ft)
- Coordinates: 46°10′31″N 7°57′23.5″E

Geography
- Location within Switzerland
- Location: Valais, Switzerland
- Parent range: Pennine Alps

The Äusser Rothorn is a mountain of the Swiss Pennine Alps, overlooking Saas-Balen in the canton of Valais. It lies at the western end of the Rothorngrat, descending from the Senggchuppa.
