= Rossbode Glacier =

Glacier in Switzerland

Coordinates: 46°11′20″N 8°0′41″E

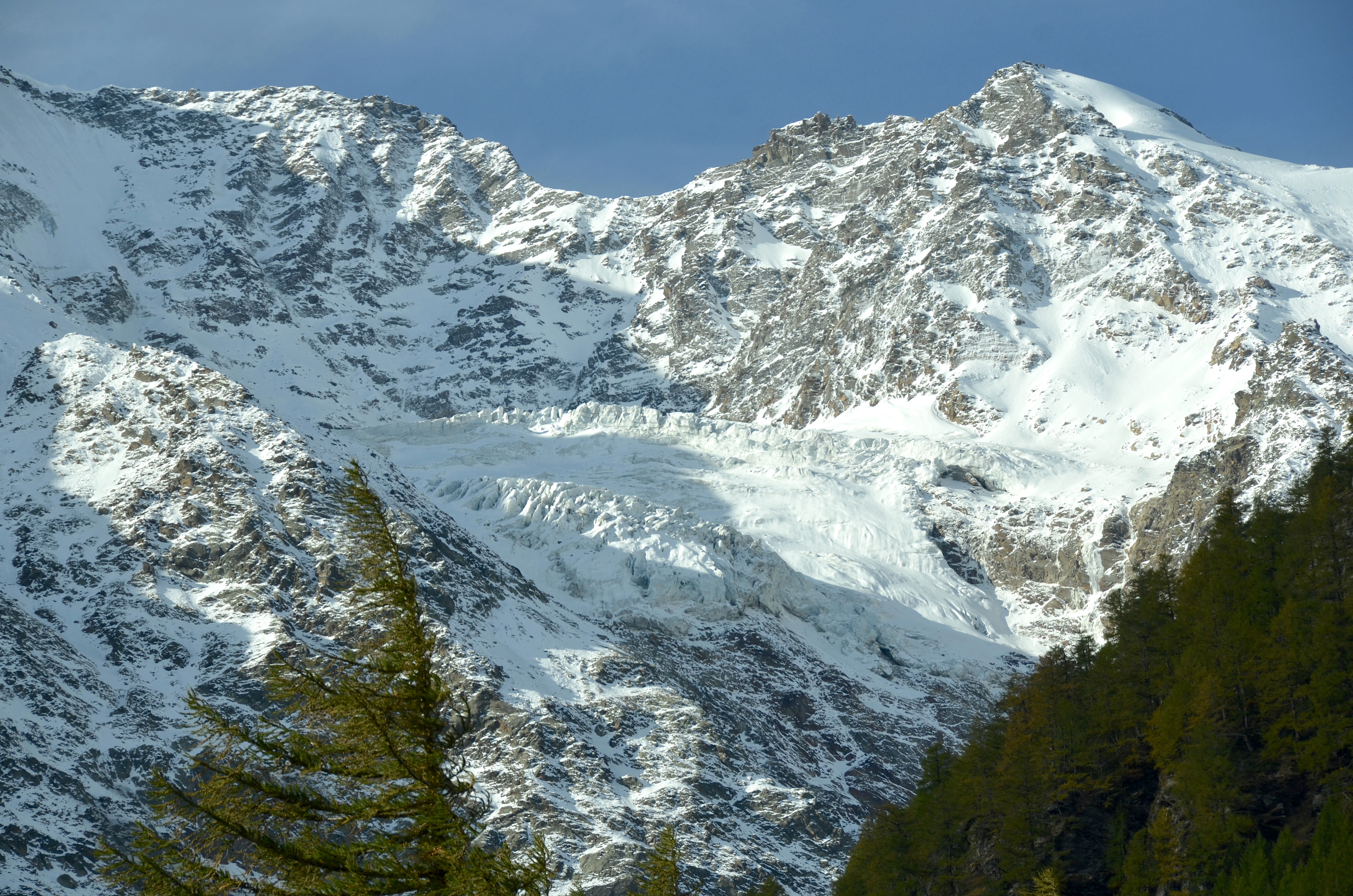
Rossbode Glacier (2020)

The Rossbode Glacier (German: Rossbodegletscher) is a 3.5 km long glacier (2005) situated in the Pennine Alps in the canton of Valais in Switzerland. In 1973 it had an area of 1.87 km^{2}.

== See also ==
- List of glaciers in Switzerland
- Swiss Alps
