= Ferdenrothorn =

Mountain in Switzerland

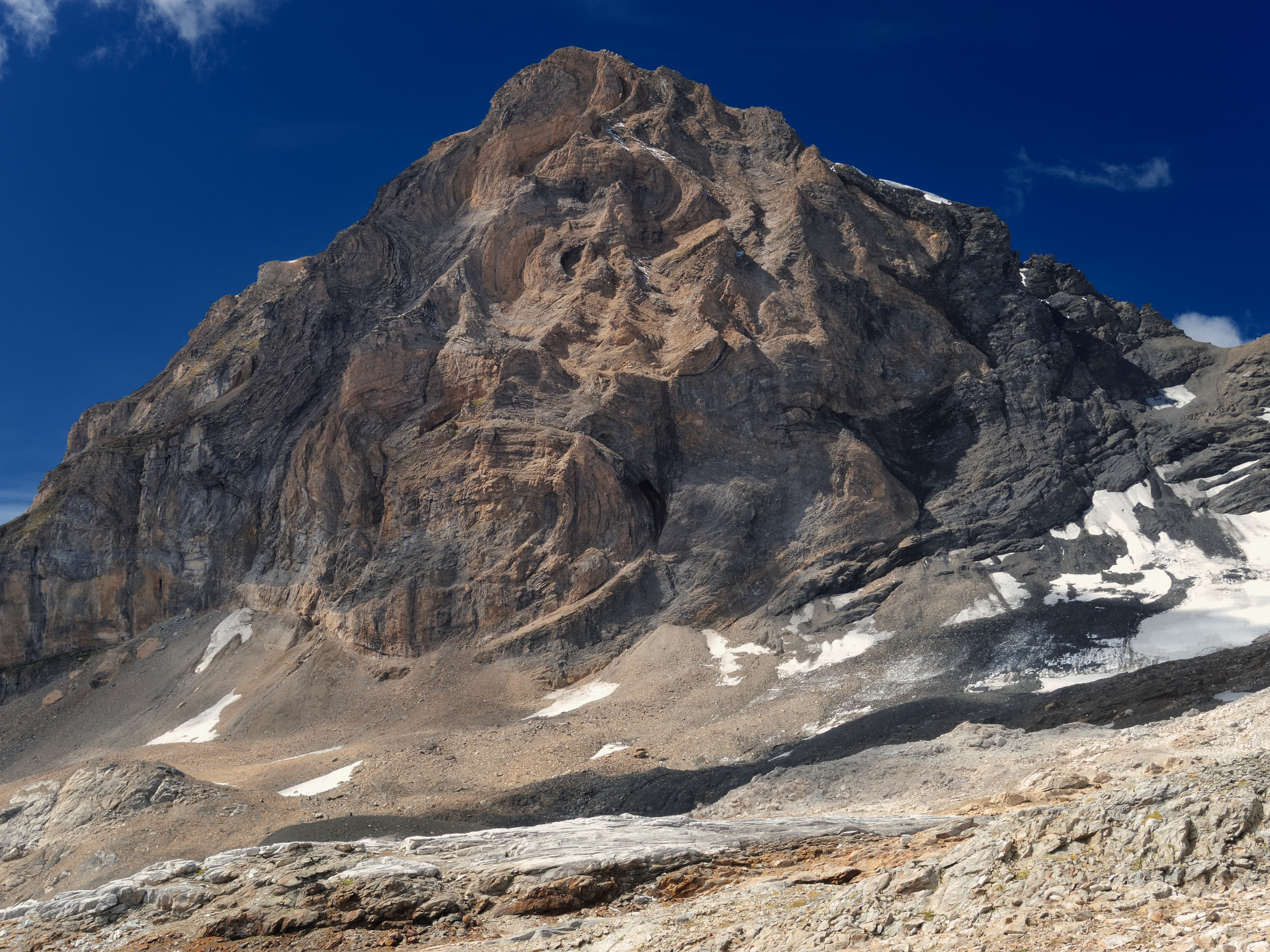
- The Ferdenrothorn from the east side with the Ferdengletscher at its feet

Highest point
- Elevation: 3,180 m (10,430 ft)
- Prominence: 268 m (879 ft)
- Parent peak: Balmhorn
- Coordinates: 46°24′32.4″N 7°42′27.7″E

Geography
- Location within Switzerland
- Location: Valais, Switzerland
- Parent range: Bernese Alps

The Ferdenrothorn is a mountain of the Bernese Alps, located between Leukerbad and Ferden in the canton of Valais. It lies south of the Balmhorn and overlooks the Lötschen Pass on its north side. Its east side shows well marked folds.
