= Lagginhorn =

Mountain in Switzerland

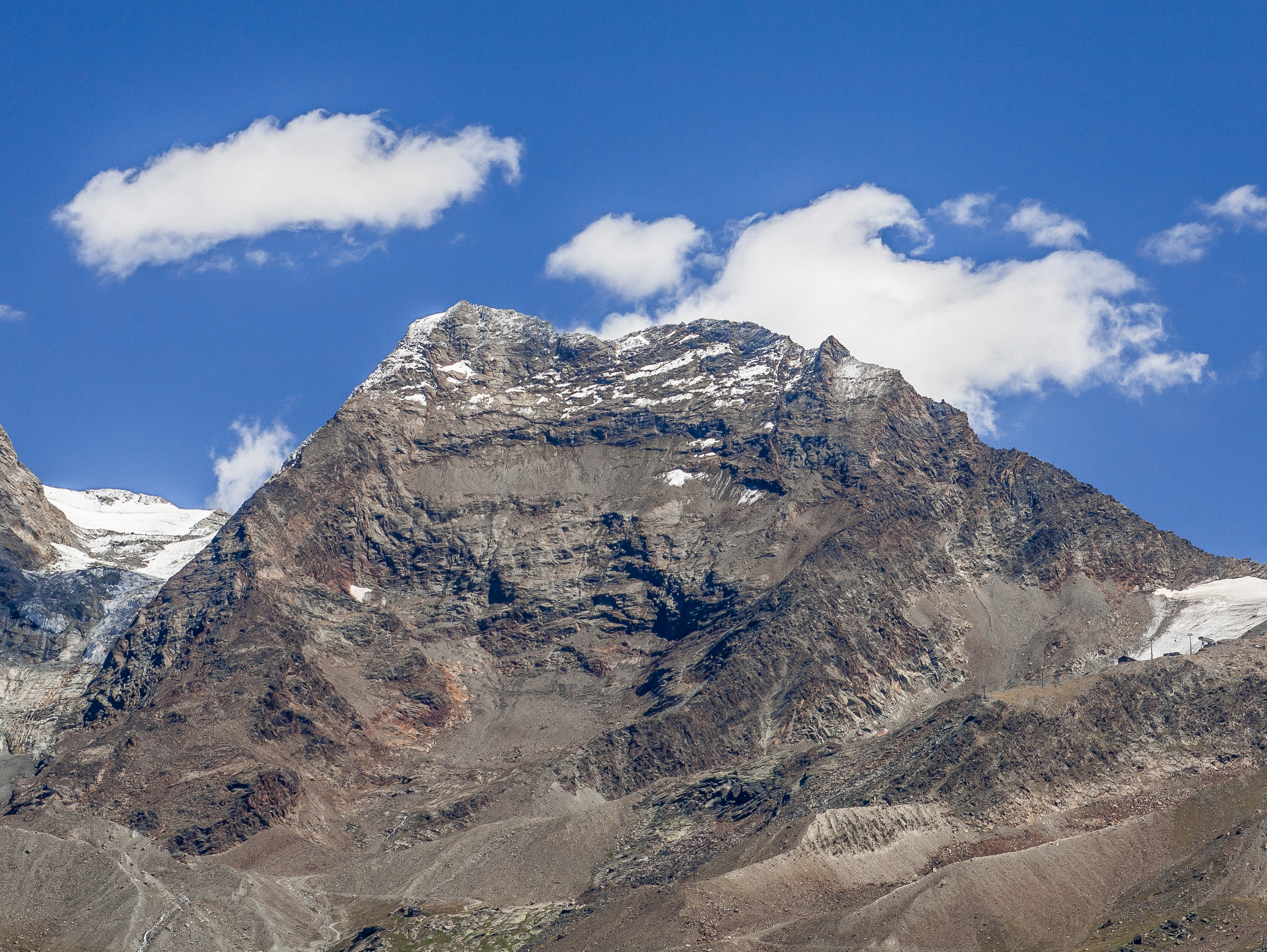
- July 2022 photograph of the west face of the Lagginhorn with the Weissmies Hut in the foreground showing typical summer conditions. The "West Ridge" normal route is visible on the left. The Laggin Glacier is no longer extant.

Highest point
- Elevation: 4,010 m (13,160 ft)
- Prominence: 512 m (1,680 ft)
- Parent peak: Weissmies
- Isolation: 3.3 km (2.1 mi)
- Coordinates: 46°9′26″N 8°0′11″E

Geography
- Location within Switzerland
- Location: Valais, Switzerland
- Parent range: Pennine Alps

Climbing
- First ascent: 26 August 1856 by E. L. Ames, Franz Andenmatten and Johann Josef Imseng, together with three Englishmen and three guides
- Easiest route: West ridge (PD)

The Lagginhorn (4,010 m), also known as Laquinhorn or ts Lagg'ii, is a mountain in the Pennine Alps in Switzerland. It lies a few kilometres north of the slightly higher Weissmies and also close to the slightly lower Fletschhorn on the north.

The Lagginhorn is the last four-thousander in the main chain before the Simplon Pass; it is also the second-lowest four-thousander (number 58 of 60) in Switzerland. A rocky, mostly unglaciated summit, it is one of the few Alpine 4000m mountains accessible without any necessary glacier crossings and therefore can be climbed solo with appropriate experience.

The first ascent was by Edward Levi Ames and three other Englishmen, together with local Saas Grund clergyman Johann Josef Imseng, Franz Andenmatten (landlord of the Monte Rosa Hotel) and three other guides on 26 August 1856.

== Etymology ==
Lagginhorn's etymology is obscure but may derive from the Latin lacus or the Saracen arabic allâqîn. The local Saastal people call it ts Lagg'ii today.

== Geology ==
The Lagginhorn and its neighbours within the Weissmies Range fall within the parautochthon of the Monte Rosa portion of the Middle Penninic Nappe. Rocks of the Lagginhorn are a terrane of the Briançonnais microcontinent, typically gniesses or schists. They are characterised by the presence of biotite, muscovite, albite, chlorite, and garnet.

== History ==
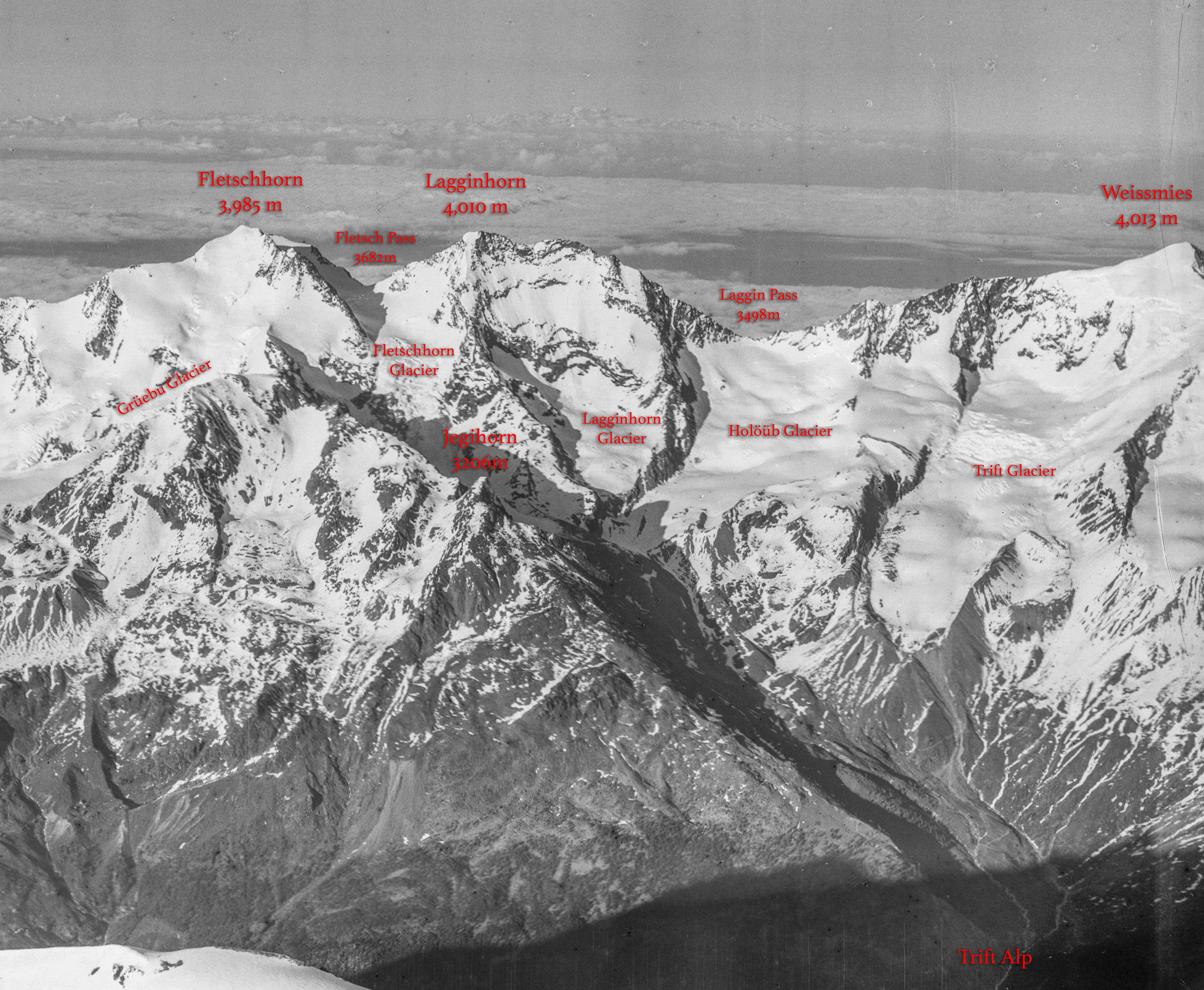
Annotated 1928 aerial image showing the Fletschhorn, Lagginhorn and Weissmies.

The Lagginhorn was not originally recognised as an independent summit between the Fletschhorn and Weissmies on early 19th century mapping by Keller (1834) and Hans Felix Leuthold; the name first appears to be recorded as a separate peak by Bernhard Studer in 1855 as "Laquinhorn". Previously "Laquinhorn" often appeared as a synonym for the Weissmies, such as by Zeigler (1853). About this time height of the Lagginhorn was estimated to be 13,206 ft (4025m), some 15m greater than its established height today.

Edward Levi Ames (later JP; 1832–92) of Clevelands, Lyme Regis, was staying at the Eggishorn Hotel in August 1856 having failed in his summit attempt at the Finsteraarhorn, when he first caught sight of the Fletschhorn and Weissmies Group. On Saturday 23 August he arrived in Saas Grund where he met with the Curate Johann Josef Imseng who agreed to accompany him on the summit attempt planned for the following Monday. Three other Englishmen also staying in the nearby Monta Rosa Hotel as well as the landlord Franz Andenmatten (described as a "merry, good-tempered fellow, and a first-rate mountaineer") and three other local mountaineers joined the party in preparation that weekend.

Edward Levi Ames and the English party first reconnoitred the mountain remotely by ascending the western slopes of the Saastal on the Dom side, where they could view the Weissmies Group with telescopes. The summits were otherwise not visible from the valley bottom. Ames noted the difficulty presented by glacier crossings on the Fletschhorn but was able to observe the glacier-free West Ridge route of the Lagginhorn. From their perspective, the party thought the Fletschhorn to look higher than the Lagginhorn, however decided upon their attempt at the Lagginhorn after discovering the former had recently received a recorded summit by a local professor. At this time, there was no local knowledge of any previous ascents of the Lagginhorn.

The party of 9 first made their way to Trift Alp, a cheesemaking transhumance alp at 2074m, where they spent the night. The next morning the party left at 3am and first ascending through alpine pasture, arrived at glacial morraines at the foot of the mountains where they ate their first meal; a tin of butter, which Ames advocated in place of cheese.

Taking what is now the most popular route, the West Ridge, the party were engaged in scrambling for some 4 hours. Ames described the ridge as icy and a "series of miniature fortresses". Ames followed by Andenmatten were the first to summit at approximately 10am, later followed by the rest of the party. From their position at the summit of Lagginhorn, the party was able to observe that the Fletschhorn was in fact of a lower elevation. They remained on the summit until about 11:30am, sheltering from sub-zero wind-chill before beginning their descent. Ames and Andenmatten were once again faster than their compatriots and the group again split, Ames arriving back at Saas at 16:15.

Imseng appears to have made the ascent in some form of his clerical robes, which Ames described as "his peculiar garb". Imseng appears to have made the ascent/descent of Lagginhorn from the Saastal (1550m) in one day (joining the party camped at Trift Alp); an ascent of nearly 2500m. Ames concluded that mountain was well suited to one day expeditions.

== Climbing routes ==
The Lagginhorn is characterised by rock climbing rather than snow climbs and possesses a lengthy scramble along the South Ridge including one or more exposed abseils:

- West Ridge, PD
- North Ridge AD, III
- East Spur AD+, III
- South Ridge AD, II / III

=== West Ridge "Normal Route" ===
Grade PD (I-II). The route begins at the Weissmies Hut (2726m) which can be easily reached from various hiking routes starting at the valley floor at Saas-Grund (1560m). Alternatively the Hohsaas cable car can be used to ascend to Kreuzboden (2398m) or the Hohsaas Hut (3101m, followed by a descent to the Weissmies Hut).

Previous routes ascended across the Laggin Glacier, but this is no longer recommended due to the risk of rock falls. In recent years it has become possible summit Lagginhorn via the West Ridge as a challenging trail run using minimal snow and ice gear and has been achieved by Hillary Gerardi amongst others. However this approach requires ideal conditions and still introduces risk.

== Huts ==
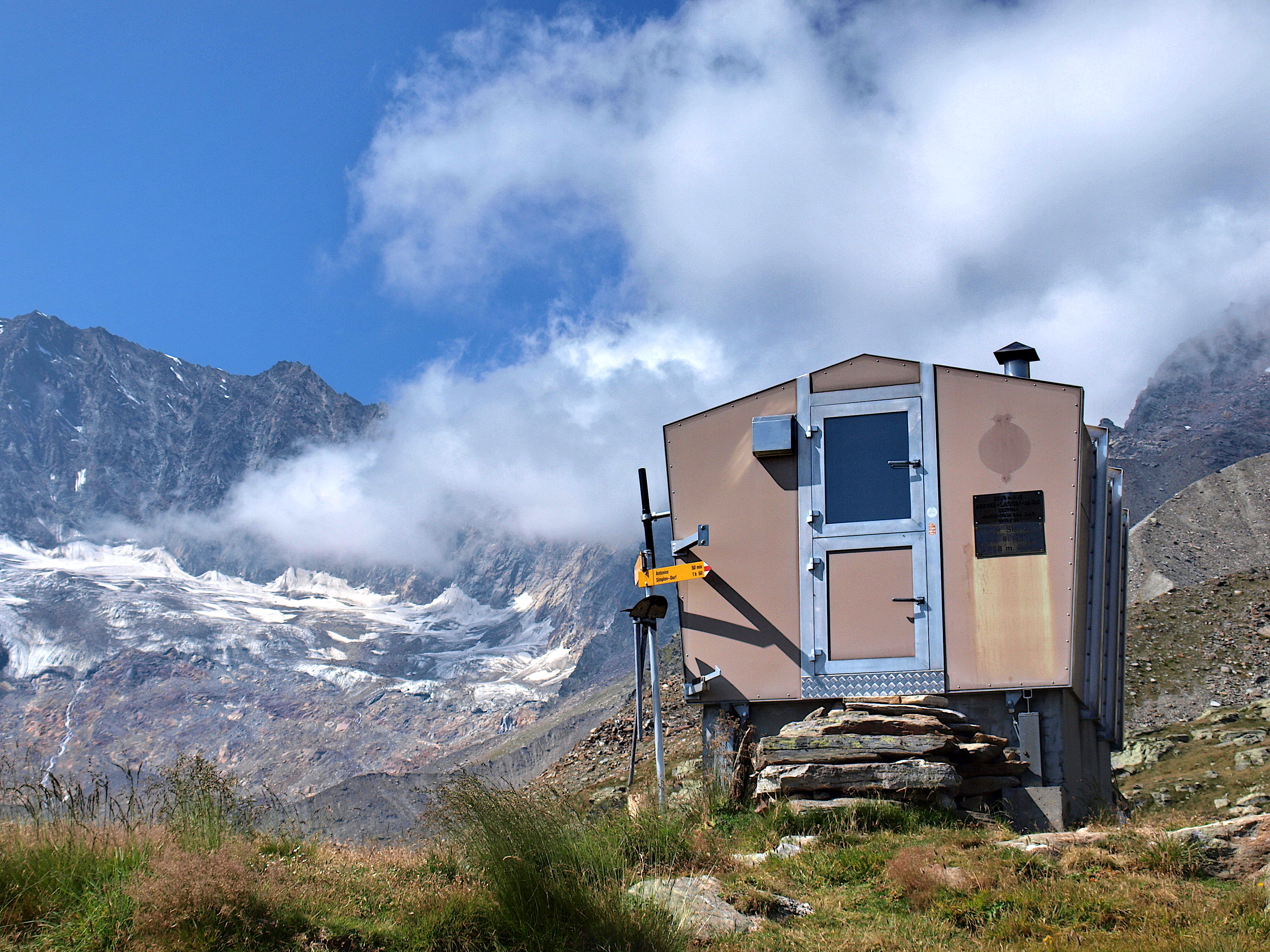
Laggin bivouac (2425 m) 46°09′52″N 008°02′44″E

- Weissmies Hut (2,726m)
- Hohsaas Hut (3,100m)
- Laggin Bivouac (2,425m)

== Rockfalls ==
Between 2009 and 2021 there were eleven recorded rockfalls.

== Accidents ==
The Swiss Alpine Club website states that "the Lagginhorn is not a simple mountain" and "every year fatal accidents happen on the normal descent". In July 2012 the worst mountaineering accident of that year occurred on the Lagginhorn where 5 climbers fell several hundred metres from the snowfield near the summit whilst descending. It is thought that they may have slipped on ice hidden beneath fresh snow after a period of rain. In July/August 2023 two climbers fell 200m at around 3960m for unknown reasons. In August 2024 two climbers died from a 50m fall whilst attempting the South Ridge route. Another fatality occurred in August 2025 after a fall at around 3800m whilst ascending the West Ridge route.

== Maps ==
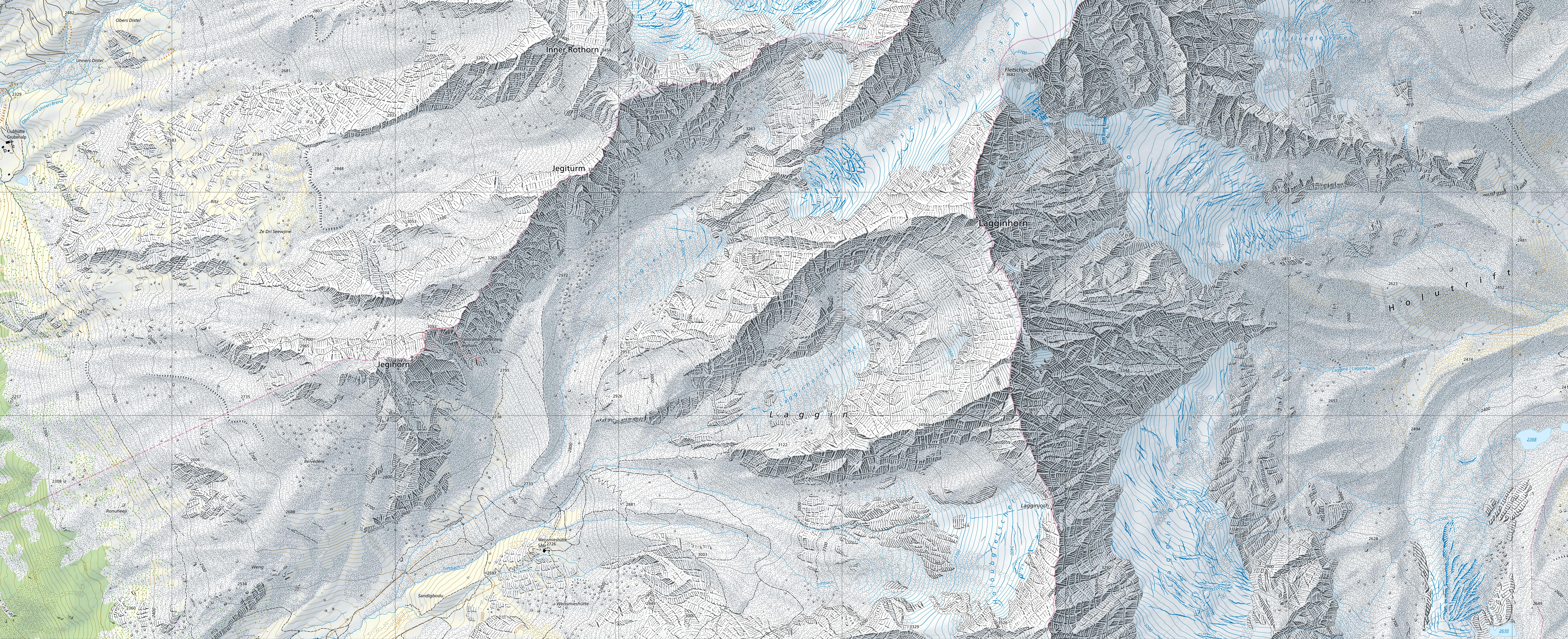
1:10,000 Swisstopo map of the Lagginhorn and its western slope of the Saastal.

Map by Bernhard Studer showing the "Laquinhorn".

== See also ==
- List of 4000 metre peaks of the Alps
- Geology of the Alps

== Bibliography ==
- Dumler, Helmut and Willi P. Burkhardt, The High Mountains of the Alps, London: Diadem, 1994
- Ball, John (1860). Peaks, Passes, and Glaciers: A Series of Excursions by Members of the Alpine Club. London: Longman.
- Romelli, Marco; Cividini, Valentino (2019). 4000m Peaks of the Alps: Normal and Classic Routes (2nd ed.). Villa di Teolo, Piedmont: Idea Montangna.
