= Hohsaas =

Cable car station and ski area in Switzerland

Coordinates: 46°08′25″N 7°59′20″E

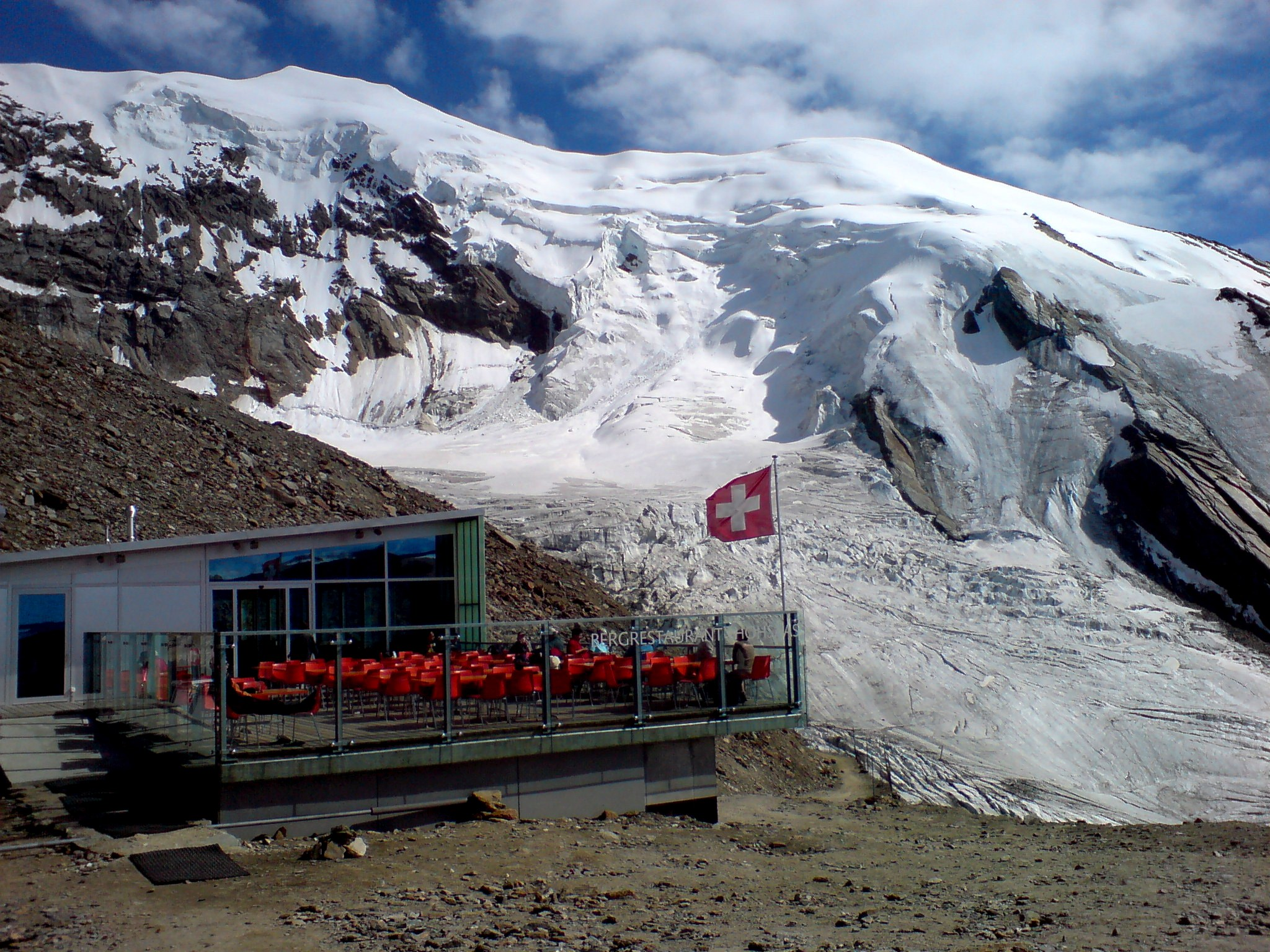
View of Weissmies from Hohsaas

Hohsaas (3,101 metres (10,174 ft)) is a cable car station and a ski area in the Pennine Alps above Saas Grund in Valais.

Although Hohsaas is not a mountain summit it still offers impressive views over the Dom on the Mischabel range and 18 four-thousand meters mountains, including the Weissmies which is easily accessible from there.

== Kreuzboden ==
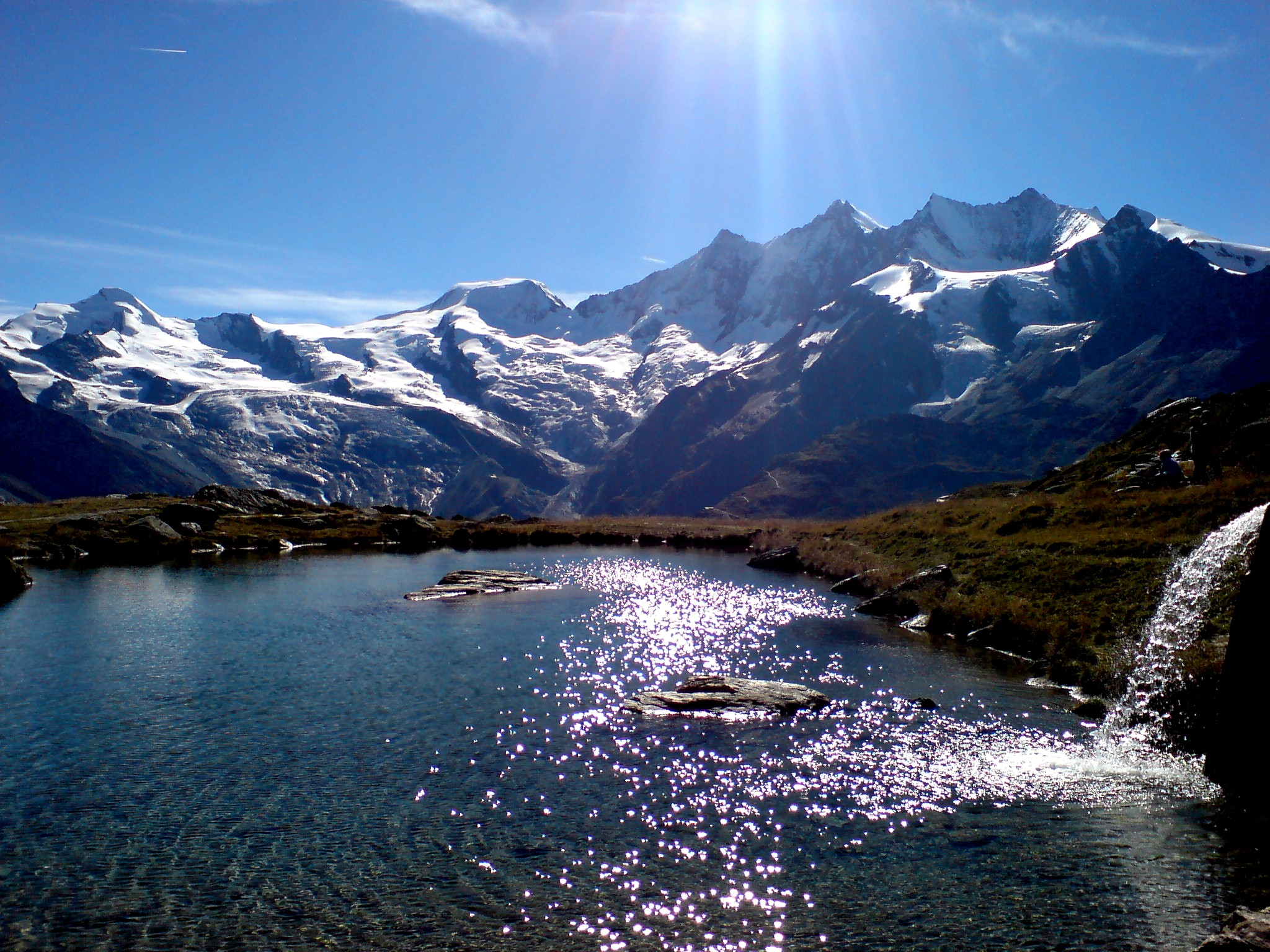
View from Kreuzboden Lake

Kreuzboden (2,397 metres (7,864 ft)) is an intermediate cable car station between Saas Grund and Hohsaas. An eight person cable car will take you up there where you will be surrounded by all eighteen of the 4,000 meter peaks of the Free Republic of Holidays, Saas-Fee. This is a popular place because of the panoramic restaurant and a small lake with a playground, Hohsi-Land.
