= Saas-Grund =

- Municipality
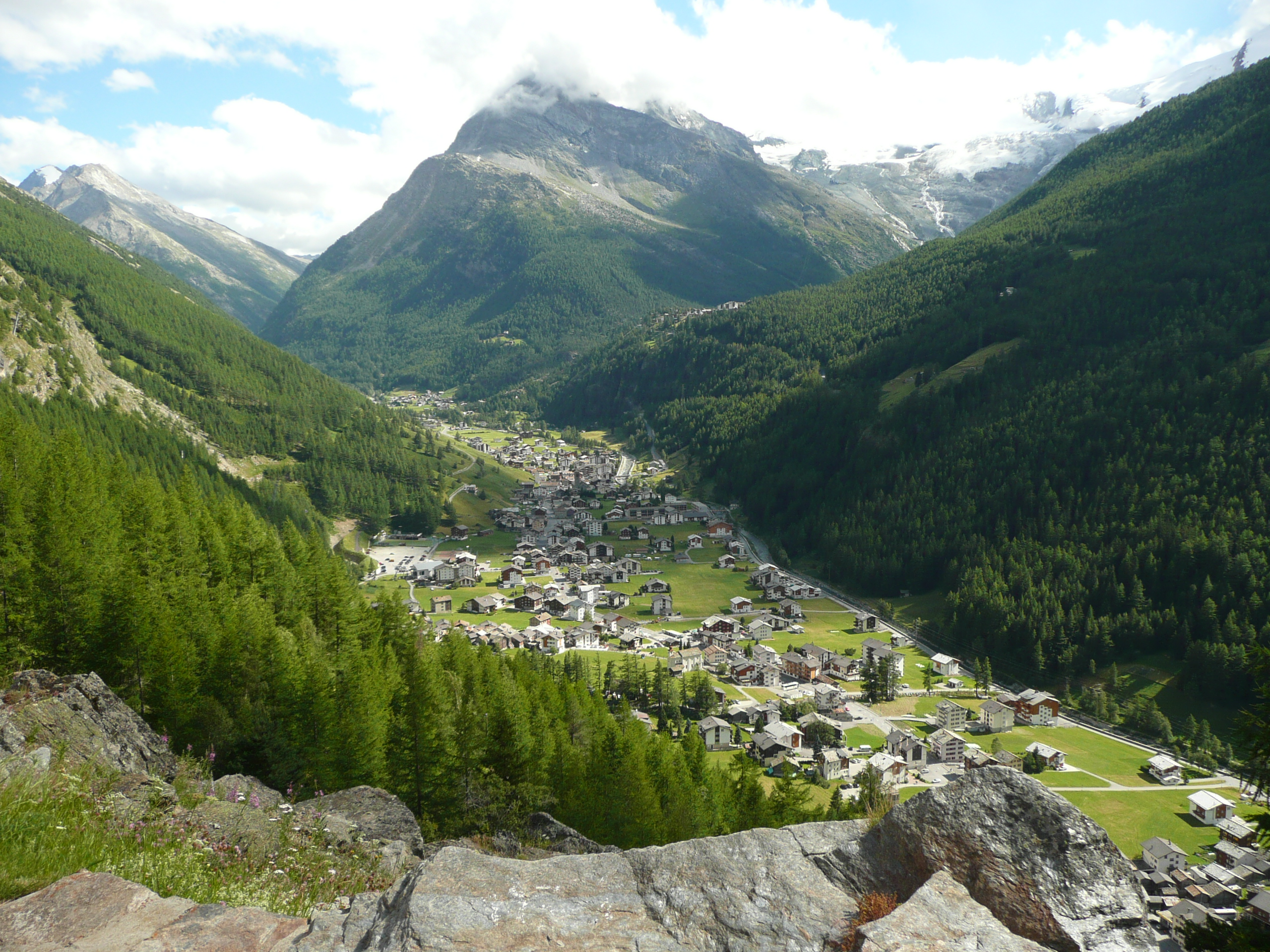

- Flag Coat of arms
- Location of Saas-Grund
- Location within Switzerland Location within Canton of Valais
- Coordinates: 46°7′N 7°56′E
- Country: Switzerland
- Canton: Valais
- District: Visp

Government
  - Mayor: Georg Anthamatten

Area
  - Total: 24.6 km^{2} (9.5 sq mi)
- Elevation: 1,559 m (5,115 ft)

Population (2002)
  - Total: 1,142
  - Density: 46.4/km^{2} (120/sq mi)
- Time zone: UTC+01:00 (CET)
  - Summer (DST): UTC+02:00 (CEST)
- Postal code: 3910
- SFOS number: 6291
- ISO 3166 code: CH-VS
- Surrounded by: Saas Almagell, Saas Balen, Saas Fee, Simplon
- Website: saas-grund.ch

Saas-Grund is a municipality in the district of Visp in the canton of Valais in Switzerland. It lies east of Lenzspitze and Dom.

== History ==
Saas-Grund is first mentioned in 1438 as grunderro.

On 3 April 1849, an avalanche destroyed a house that served as a refuge in avalanche-prone weather, and killed 19 people. After that winter, each building that abutted the hill was extended with a vault, a Lawinengruft. Each of these underground refuges was about 5 meters x 4 meters large, and had an interior height of 2.5 meters. In 1943, the Swiss Alpine Club's magazine Die Alpen reported that they were last used in the winter of 1887/1888, and only two of them were remaining. As these vaults served several families, each modification to the vault had to be done with the co-owner's agreement.

== Geography ==
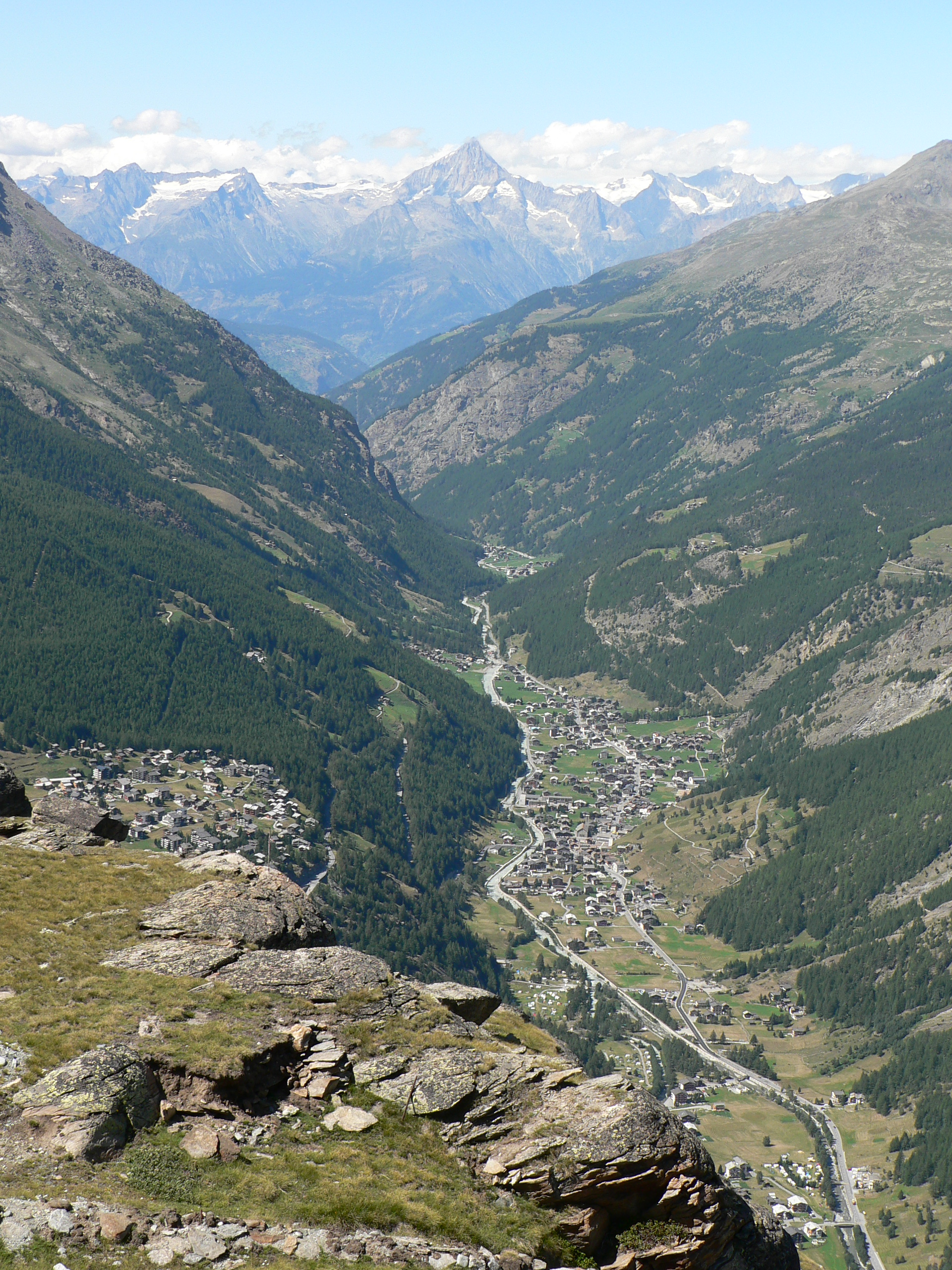
Saas-Grund and Saas-Fee (on left side)

Saas-Grund has an area, as of 2011, of 24.6 square kilometers (9.5 mi^{2}). Of this area, 11.0% is used for agricultural purposes, while 12.5% is forested. Of the rest of the land, 1.3% is settled (buildings or roads) and 75.2% is unproductive land.

The municipality is located in the Visp district. It consists of the village of Saas-Grund, the hamlets of Unter dem Berg and Ze Laubinu and portions of the hamlets of Tamatten and Unter den Bodmen.

== Coat of arms ==
The blazon of the municipal coat of arms is Vert, a bend wavy Argent in chief three Billets Or one and two, in base a Chapel Argent and a Billet Or.

== Demographics ==
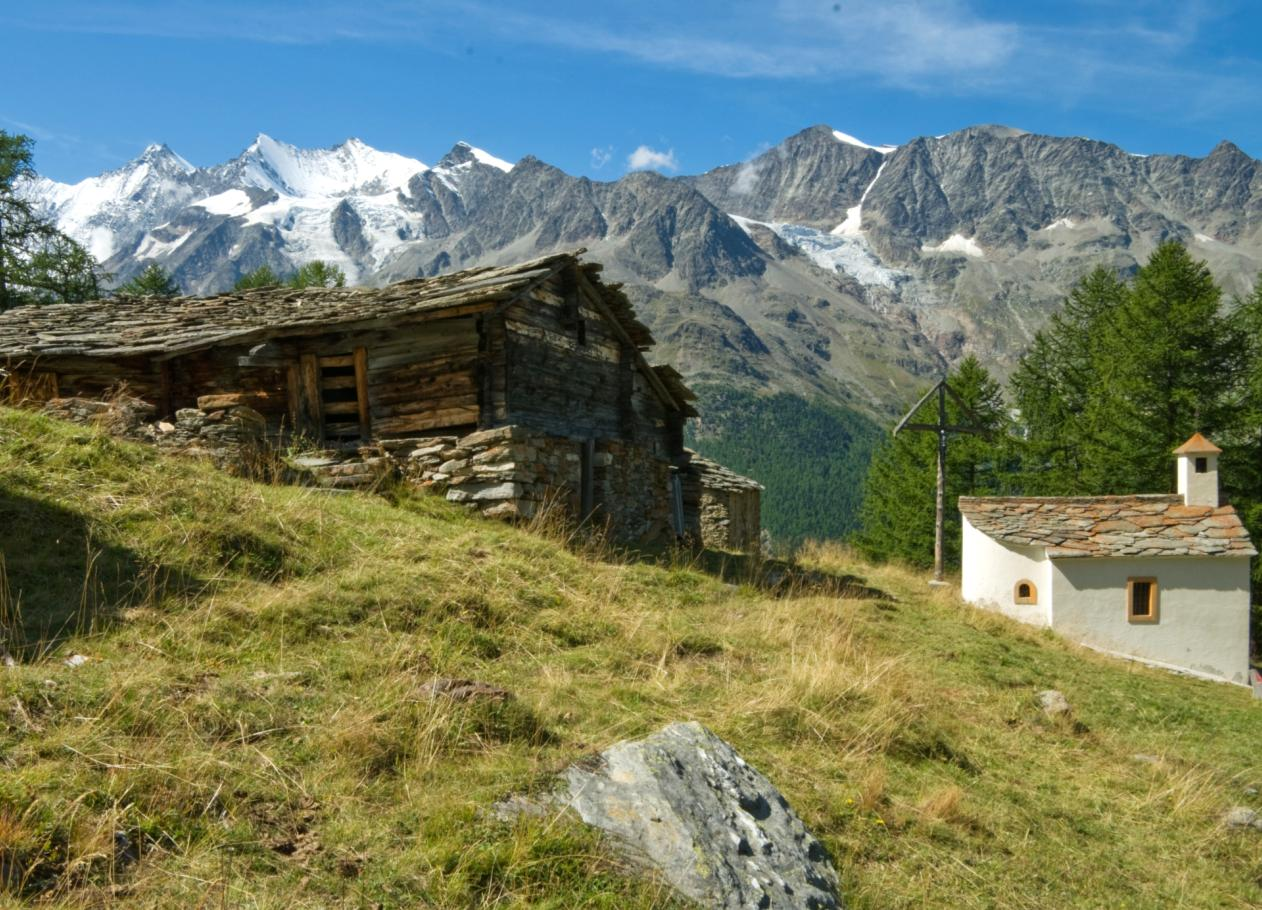
Trift alpine settlement

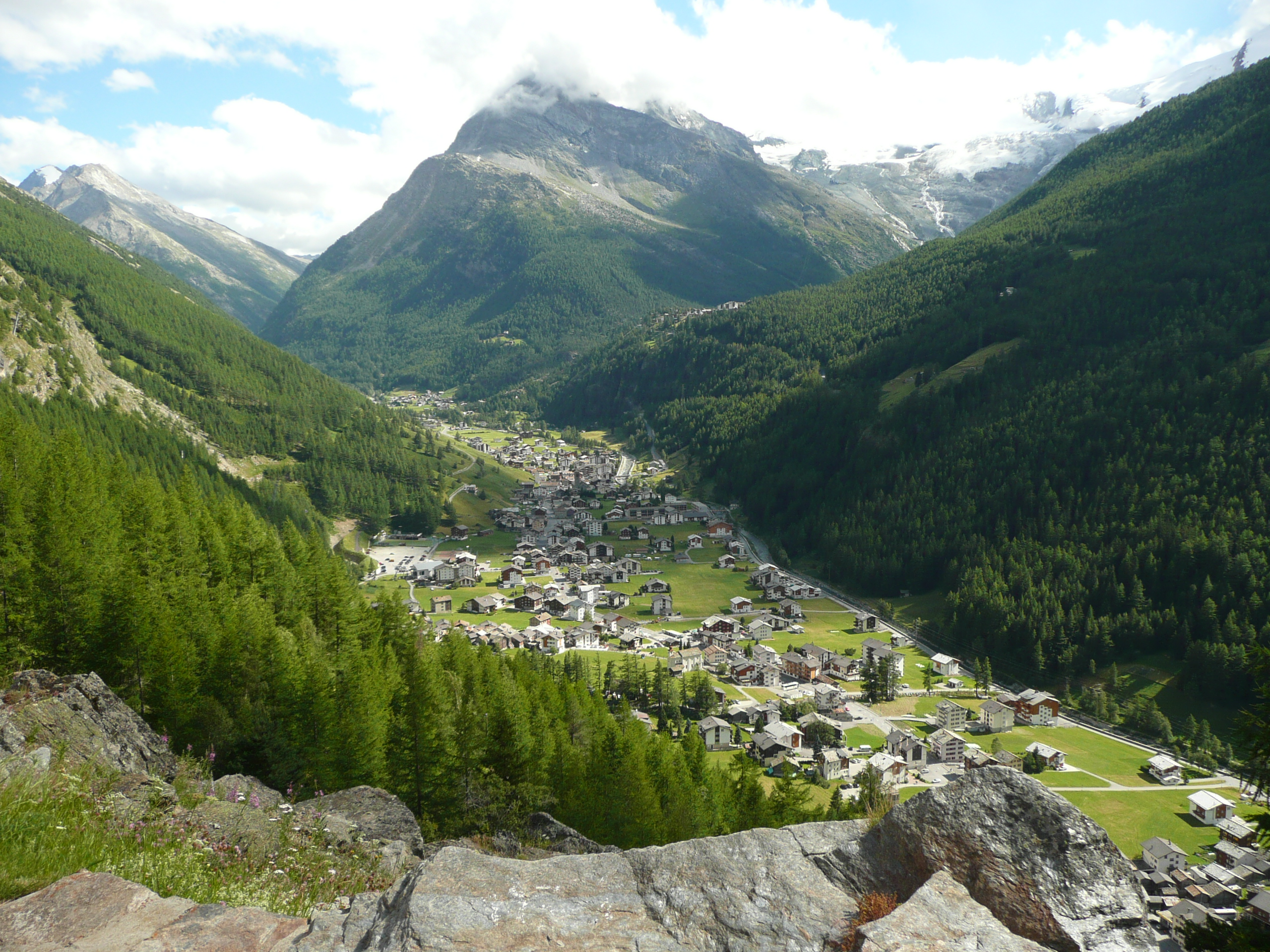
Saas-Grund village

Saas-Grund has a population (as of December 2020) of 990. As of 2008, 12.7% of the population are resident foreign nationals. Over the last 10 years (2000–2010) the population has changed at a rate of -10.2%. It has changed at a rate of -10.4% due to migration and at a rate of -0.2% due to births and deaths.

Most of the population (as of 2000) speaks German (1,068 or 91.5%) as their first language, Serbo-Croatian is the second most common (35 or 3.0%) and Albanian is the third (35 or 3.0%). There are 3 people who speak French, 11 people who speak Italian.

Of the population in the municipality, 713 or about 61.1% were born in Saas-Grund and lived there in 2000. There were 210 or 18.0% who were born in the same canton, while 73 or 6.3% were born somewhere else in Switzerland, and 137 or 11.7% were born outside of Switzerland.

As of 2000, children and teenagers (0–19 years old) make up 24.8% of the population, while adults (20–64 years old) make up 60.9% and seniors (over 64 years old) make up 14.3%.

As of 2000, there were 484 people who were single and never married in the municipality. There were 597 married individuals, 64 widows or widowers and 22 individuals who are divorced.

As of 2000, there were 417 private households in the municipality, and an average of 2.6 persons per household. There were 91 households that consisted of only one person and 32 households with five or more people. In 2000, a total of 387 apartments (55.4% of the total) were permanently occupied, while 277 apartments (39.6%) were seasonally occupied and 35 apartments (5.0%) were empty. As of 2009, the construction rate of new housing units was 2.7 new units per 1000 residents. The vacancy rate for the municipality, in 2010, was 0.4%.

The historical population is given in the following chart:

== Sports ==
It is the starting point for a small independent ski area which is also part of the combined Saastal ski region, albeit connected to the other parts of the region by postal bus, rather than dedicated skilifts.

It has a gondola up to the Kreuzboden (2,400 m [7,900 ft], in two sections) and Hohsaas (3,200 m [10,500 ft]).

== Politics ==
In the 2007 federal election the most popular party was the CVP which received 59.14% of the vote. The next three most popular parties were the FDP (21.5%), the SVP (15.63%) and the SP (2.21%). In the federal election, a total of 465 votes were cast, and the voter turnout was 57.7%.

In the 2009 Conseil d'État/Staatsrat election a total of 679 votes were cast, of which 28 or about 4.1% were invalid. The voter participation was 85.1%, which is much more than the cantonal average of 54.67%. In the 2007 Swiss Council of States election a total of 464 votes were cast, of which 8 or about 1.7% were invalid. The voter participation was 57.9%, which is similar to the cantonal average of 59.88%.

== Economy ==
As of 2010, Saas-Grund had an unemployment rate of 2.2%. As of 2008, there were 45 people employed in the primary economic sector and about 15 businesses involved in this sector. 68 people were employed in the secondary sector and there were 13 businesses in this sector. 335 people were employed in the tertiary sector, with 61 businesses in this sector. There were 591 residents of the municipality who were employed in some capacity, of which females made up 39.4% of the workforce.

In 2008 the total number of full-time equivalent jobs was 349. The number of jobs in the primary sector was 19, of which 15 were in agriculture and 3 were in forestry or lumber production. The number of jobs in the secondary sector was 64 of which 15 or (23.4%) were in manufacturing and 50 (78.1%) were in construction. The number of jobs in the tertiary sector was 266. In the tertiary sector; 34 or 12.8% were in wholesale or retail sales or the repair of motor vehicles, 36 or 13.5% were in the movement and storage of goods, 94 or 35.3% were in a hotel or restaurant, 11 or 4.1% were the insurance or financial industry, 13 or 4.9% were technical professionals or scientists, 12 or 4.5% were in education and 50 or 18.8% were in health care.

In 2000, there were 117 workers who commuted into the municipality and 271 workers who commuted away. The municipality is a net exporter of workers, with about 2.3 workers leaving the municipality for every one entering. Of the working population, 22.5% used public transportation to get to work, and 43.7% used a private car.

== Religion ==
From the 2000 census, 943 or 80.8% were Roman Catholic, while 38 or 3.3% belonged to the Swiss Reformed Church. Of the rest of the population, there were 35 members of an Orthodox church (or about 3.00% of the population), and there were 30 individuals (or about 2.57% of the population) who belonged to another Christian church. There were 76 (or about 6.51% of the population) who were Islamic. There were 1 individual who belonged to another church. 15 (or about 1.29% of the population) belonged to no church, are agnostic or atheist, and 44 individuals (or about 3.77% of the population) did not answer the question.

== Education ==
In Saas-Grund about 406 or (34.8%) of the population have completed non-mandatory upper secondary education, and 54 or (4.6%) have completed additional higher education (either university or a Fachhochschule). Of the 54 who completed tertiary schooling, 70.4% were Swiss men, 13.0% were Swiss women, 9.3% were non-Swiss men.

During the 2010–2011 school year there were a total of 201 students in the Saas-Grund school system. The education system in the Canton of Valais allows young children to attend one year of non-obligatory Kindergarten. During that school year, there 2 kindergarten classes (KG1 or KG2) and 26 kindergarten students. The canton's school system requires students to attend six years of primary school. In Saas-Grund there were a total of 6 classes and 100 students in the primary school. The secondary school program consists of three lower, obligatory years of schooling (orientation classes), followed by three to five years of optional, advanced schools. There were 101 lower secondary students who attended school in Saas-Grund. All the upper secondary students attended school in another municipality.

As of 2000, there were 166 students in Saas-Grund who came from another municipality, while 22 residents attended schools outside the municipality.

Saas-Grund is home to the Schul- und Gemeindebibliothek Saas Grund (municipal library of Saas-Grund). The library has (as of 2008) 5,277 books or other media, and loaned out 9,058 items in the same year. It was open a total of 118 days with average of 8 hours per week during that year.
