= Fletschhorn =

Mountain in Switzerland

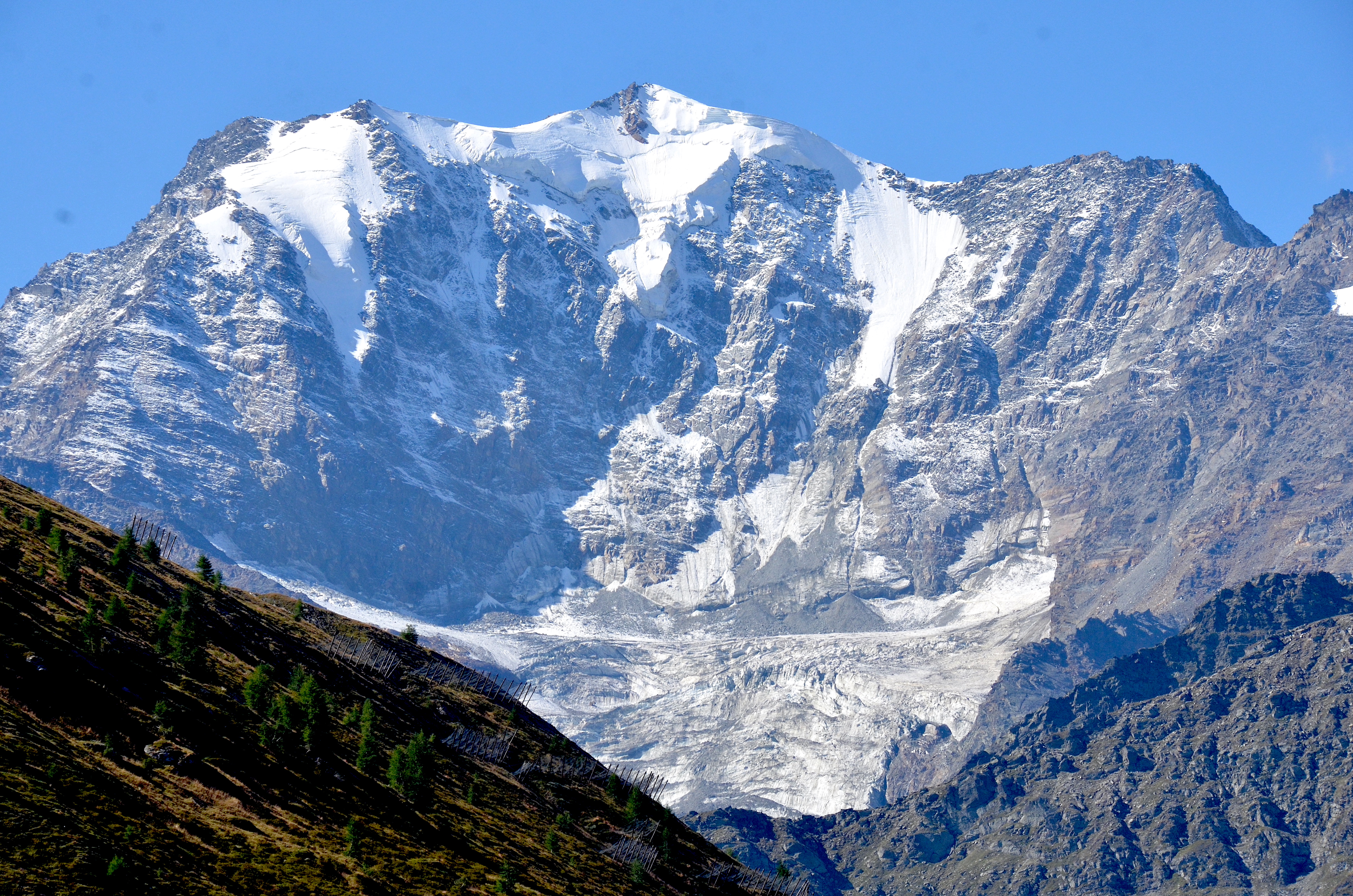
- North face of the Fletschhorn, with the Rossbode Glacier

Highest point
- Elevation: 3,985 m (13,074 ft)
- Prominence: 300 m (980 ft)
- Parent peak: Lagginhorn
- Isolation: 1.1 km (0.68 mi)
- Listing: Alpine mountains above 3000 m
- Coordinates: 46°10′4″N 8°0′11″E

Geography
- Location within Switzerland
- Location: Valais, Switzerland
- Parent range: Pennine Alps

Climbing
- First ascent: August 1854 by Michael Amherdt and his guides Johannes Zumkemmi and Friedrich Clausen
- Easiest route: Basic snow climb from Weissmies hut (2,726 m)

The Fletschhorn (3,985 m) is a mountain of the Pennine Alps, located between the Saas Valley and the Simplon Valley, in the canton of Valais. It lies in the Weissmies group, north of the Lagginhorn.

The mountain was first climbed by Michael Amherdt and his guides Johannes Zumkemmi and Friedrich Clausen in August 1854. The imposing north face was first ascended by E. R. Blanchet with guides Oskar Supersaxo and Kaspar Mooser on 25 July 1927.

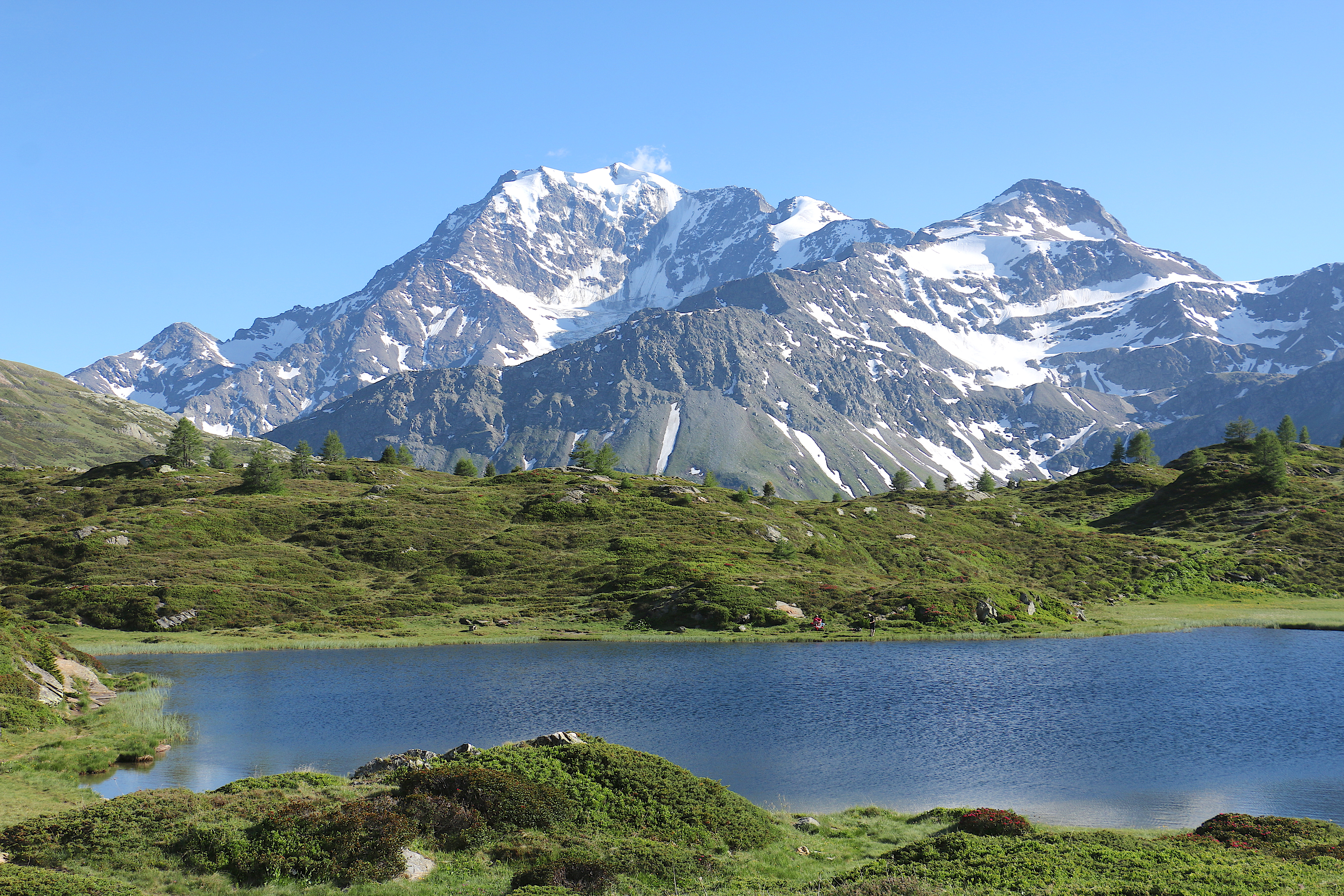
The Fletschhorn from the north, with Lake Hopschu
