= Weissmies =

Mountain in the Pennine Alps

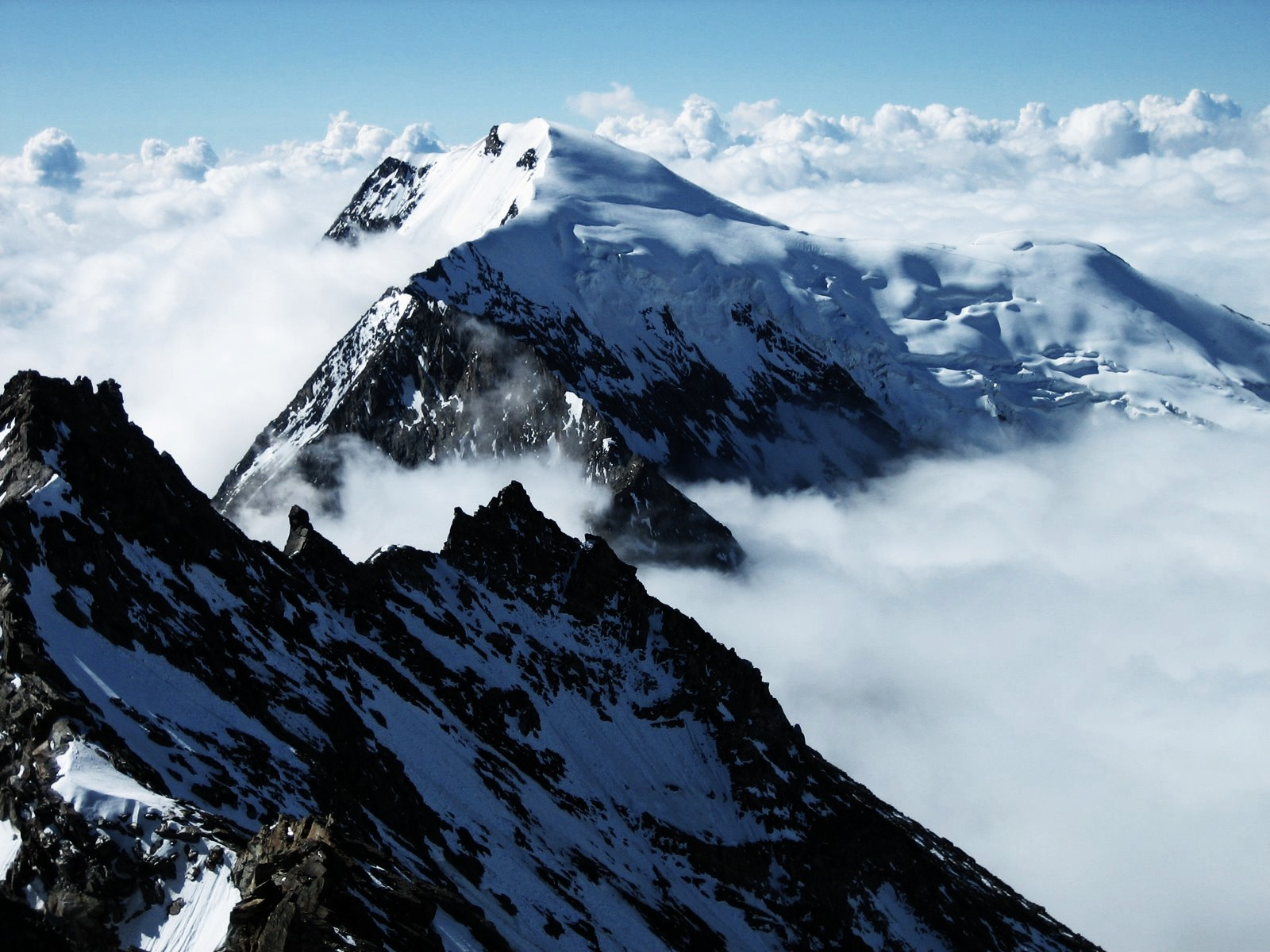
- The Weissmies as seen from Lagginhorn

Highest point
- Elevation: 4,013 m (13,166 ft)
- Prominence: 1,183 m (3,881 ft)
- Parent peak: Monte Rosa
- Isolation: 11.0 km (6.8 mi)
- Coordinates: 46°7′40″N 8°0′43″E

Geography
- Location within Switzerland
- Location: Valais, Switzerland
- Parent range: Pennine Alps

Climbing
- First ascent: Jakob Christian Häusser and Peter Josef Zurbriggen in 1855
- Easiest route: PD, basic snow climb

The Weissmies 4,013 m (13,166 ft) is a mountain in the Pennine Alps in the canton of Valais in Switzerland near the village of Saas-Fee. It is the easternmost four-thousander of its range.

== Geography ==
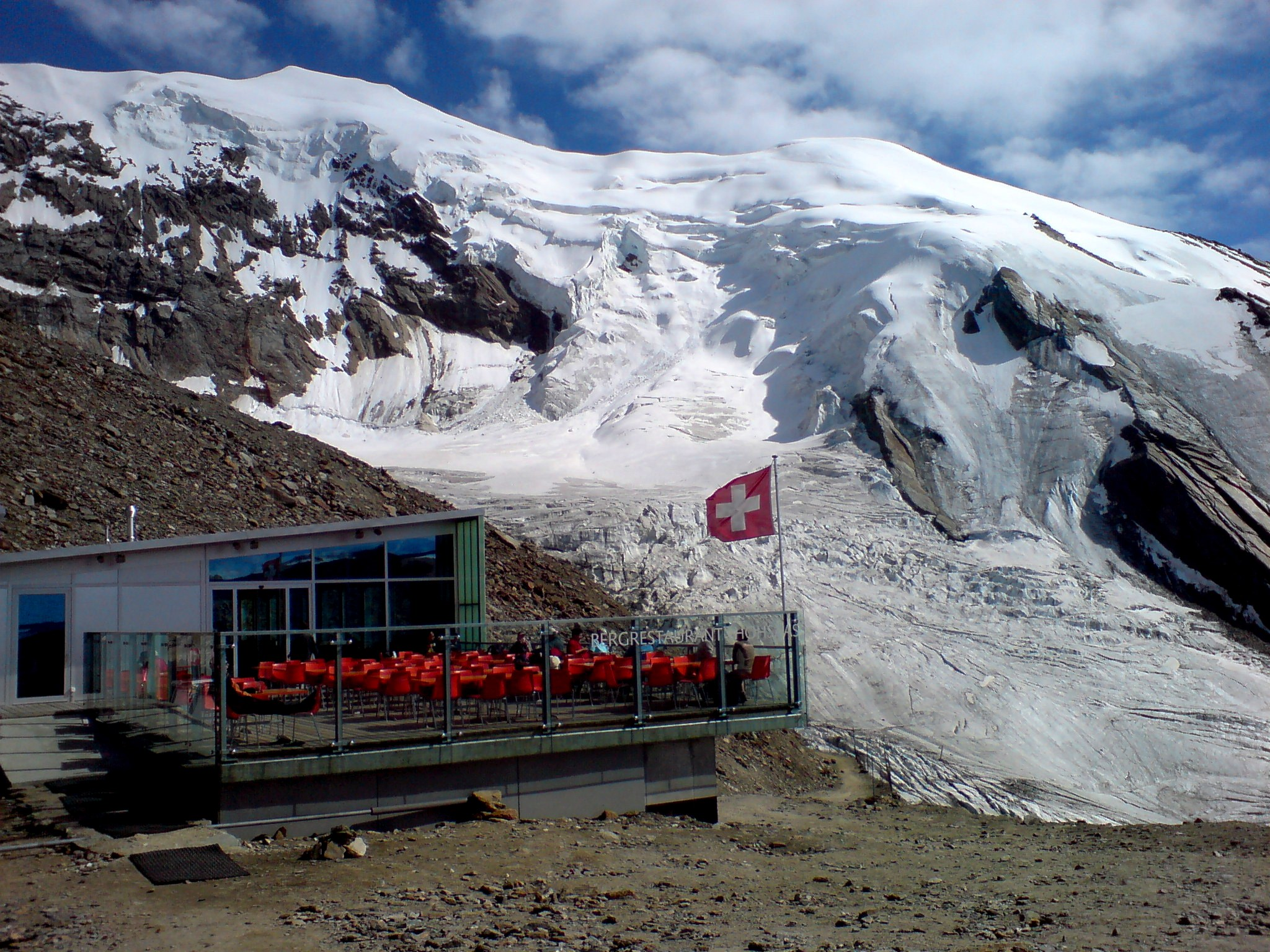
View from Hohsaas (north side)

The Weissmies is located on the main Alpine chain, on a massif separating the Saastal valley on the west and Simplon valley on the east. The massif consists of two other main summits lying to the north at almost the same altitude, the Lagginhorn and Fletschhorn. The mountain lies between the Lagginjoch (3,500 m) to the north and the Zwischbergen Pass (3,260 m) to the south.

The Weissmies is one of the 10 four-thousanders surrounding the Saastal, facing the Dom on the west, the third highest summit of the Alps.

== Climbing ==
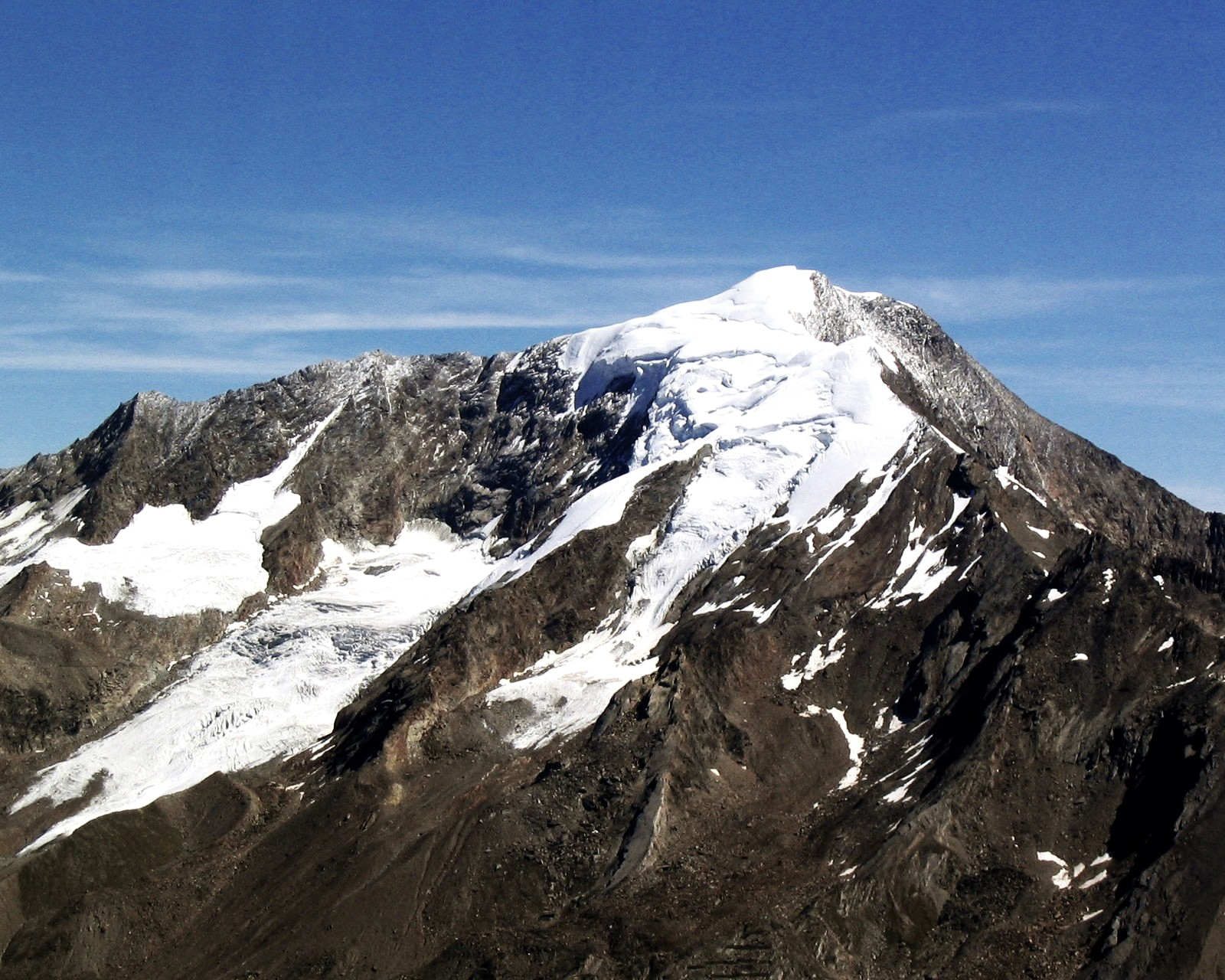
View from west

It was first climbed by Jakob Christian Häusser and Peter Josef Zurbriggen in 1855 via the Triftgrat. The ascent was mired in some controversy as the local guides did not believe that the peak could be ascended without their help; when they themselves ascended to the summit by following Häusser and Zurbriggen's footprints, they found that the highest point had indeed been reached.

The east face was climbed first by J. A. Peebles, Mr E. P. Jackson and Margaret Jackson with guides P. Schlegel, U. Rubi and J. Martin on 17 October 1876. The more difficult south face was climbed in 1884 by C. H. Wilson, A. Burgener, J. Furrer. Two weeks later, W. H. and E. Paine with T. Andenmatten and P. Zurbriggen opened a route on the northern ridge.

The approach to the Trift Glacier/south-west ridge (Triftgrat) route can now be made via lift to Hohsaas (3,100 m), which is located virtually at the edge of the glacier. The ascent from Hohsaas takes about 4 hours and involves slopes to 40 degrees and crevasses. Another route starts from the Zwischbergen Pass (above Almageller Hut) at the foot of the southern ridge.

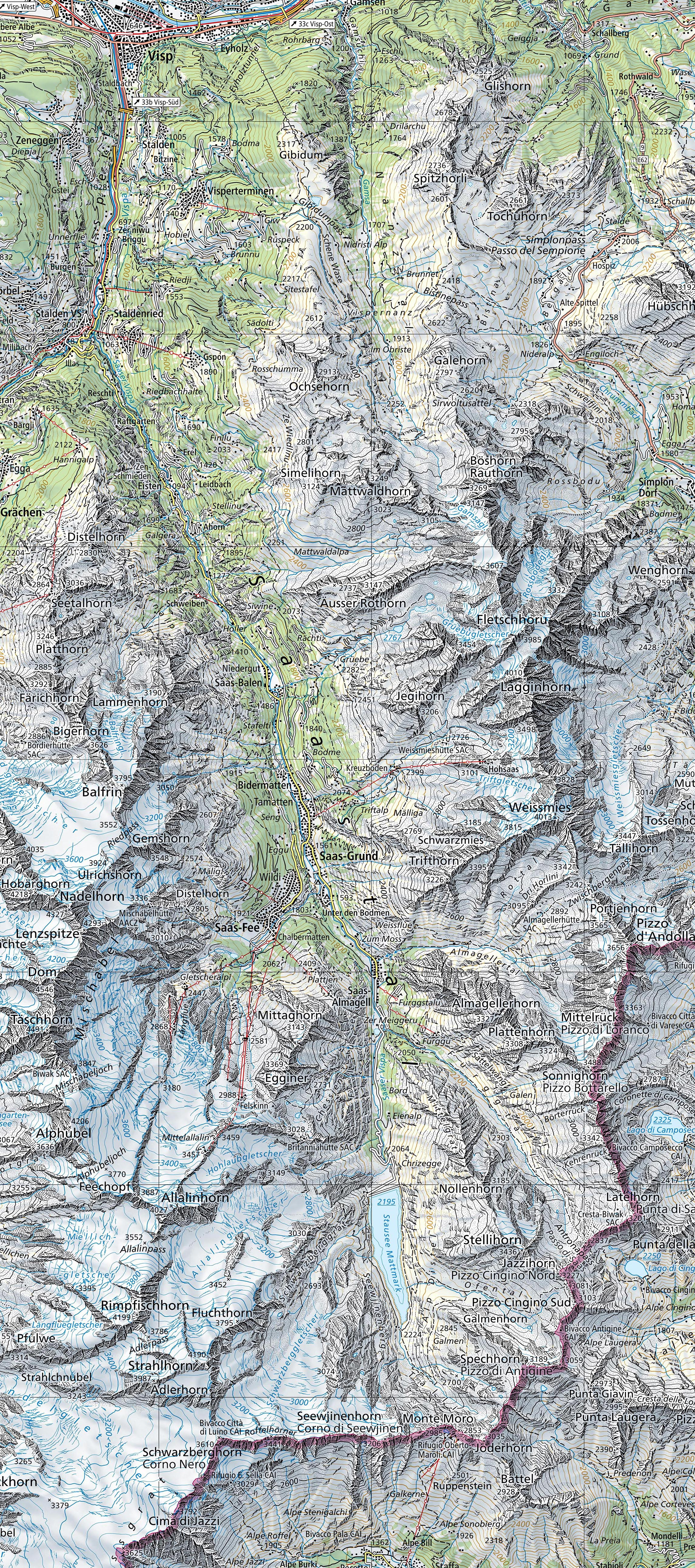
Swisstopo map of the Saastal in the canton of Valais. Its confluence with the Mattertal to its west is visible in the north, as well as the Rhône valley. The 4000m peaks of the Weissmies, Lagginhorn, Rimpfischhorn, Allainhorn, Taschhorn, Dom, Lenzspitze and Hobarghorn are visible surrounding the valley.

== See also ==
- List of 4000 metre peaks of the Alps

== Bibliography ==
- Dumler, Helmut and Willi P. Burkhardt, The High Mountains of the Alps, London: Diadem, 1994
