= Coat of arms of Valais =

The 1815 coat of arms with 13 five-pointed stars

The flag of Valais

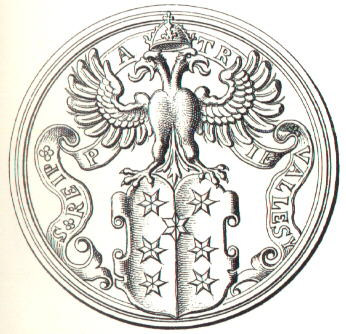
The seal of 1582 with seven six-pointed stars, inscribed S(igillum) REIP(ublice) PATRIE VALLESY

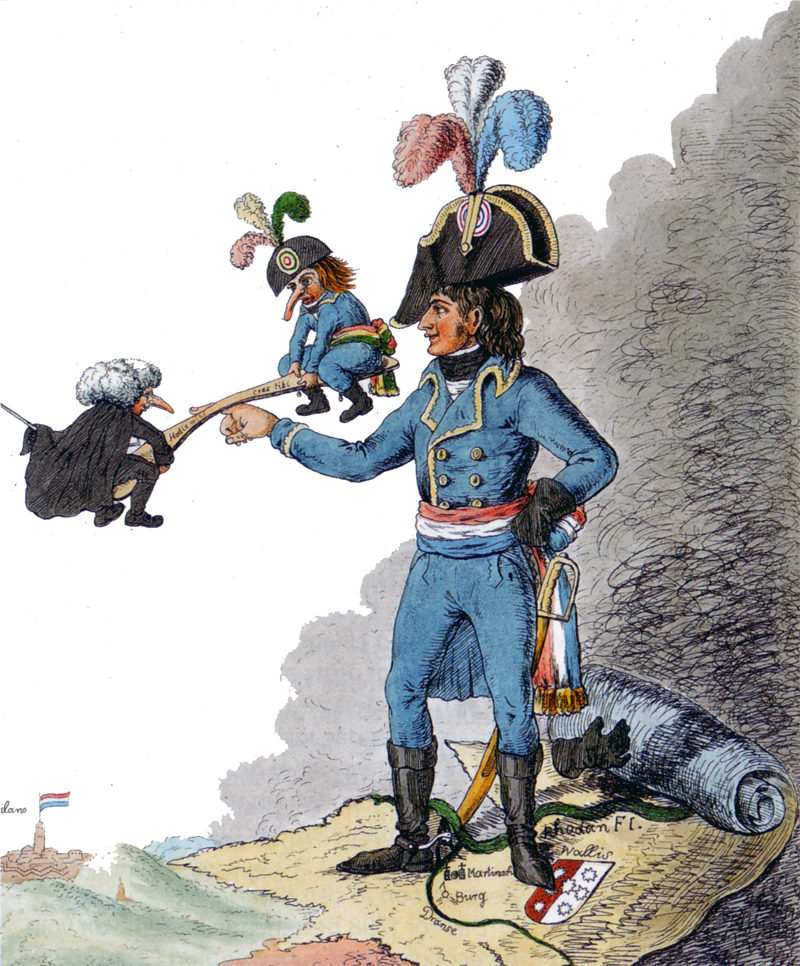
Political caricature dated 1803: Napoleon occupies the Valais while "balancing" the revolutionary and conservative factions in Switzerland. The coat of arms of Valais (now effectively the Rhodanic Republic) is shown with seven white eight-pointed stars.

The coat of arms and the flag of the Swiss canton of Valais is in red and white, divided vertically with thirteen five-pointed stars in opposite colours (Per pale argent and gules 13 mullets counterchanged). The stars represent the thirteen districts (or dizains, Zehnden "tithings"). It was introduced in 1815, when the Valais was detached from the French Department of Simplon to join the Swiss Confederacy.

The coat of arms and the flag directly continue that of the République des Sept-Dizains, the early modern union of seven dizains which declared independence from the prince-bishops of Sion.

The red and white colours were used by the bishops of Sion, in the form of a vertically divided red-and-white war flag, from c. 1220 (they are also retained in the municipal coat of arms of Sion). The addition of stars dates to the early 16th century, but the stars did not at first represent individual communes, and varied in number (between six and sixteen). The earliest maps of the Valais, printed in 1545 and in 1548, show coats of arms with ten six-pointed stars. The 1545 map has stars of unequal size, showing the two central stars somewhat larger and as mullets pierced. The use of seven stars for seven dizains is found in the seal of the Republic, made in 1582. The seal has seven six-pointed stars, three on either side and one in the center.

The bishops of Sion of the Riedmatten family in the 16th century used a coat of arms with two six-pointed stars and a trefoil. This coat of arms is depicted in a 1552 print by Sebastian Münster, as well as in the Siebmacher armorial of 1605 (p. 10). The 1547 Patenpfenning by Jacob Stampfer shows the coat of arms of Valais as Associate of the Swiss Confederacy with eleven six-pointed stars, the 1548 map by Johannes Stumpf shows the coat of arms with ten stars.

Prints of the 17th century tend to indicate the left (dexter) side of the shield as red and the right (sinister) part as white, i.e. the inverse of the modern coat of arms. The stars remain six-pointed. This is evident in Hans Conrad Geiger's map of 1637 as well as in Matthäus Merian's Topographia of 1642 (title page). The 1686 map by Pierre Duval shows an early adoption of five-pointed stars. The use of (five-pointed) stars to enumerate the territories of a Republic was an innovation at the time, later notably embraced in the Flag Act of 1777 for the flag of the United States.

Early evidence of counterchanging is found in the 1698 map by Johann Georg Bodenehr, but counterchanging remains optional throughout the 18th century and is consistently applied only with the introduction of the modern coat of arms in 1815.

In the 1802 Act of Mediation, Napoleon separated the Valais from the Helvetic Republic, into the short-lived Rhodanic Republic, which displayed twelve five-pointed stars in its coat of arms. In 1810, Napoleon annexed the Valais into the Department of Simplon. The thirteenth star, for Conthey, was added as the Valais joined the restored Swiss Confederacy in 1815.

The thirteen tithings, in order of their historical accession, are the following: The six tithings of the German-speaking Upper Valais, which had already rebelled against the prince-bishop in the Raron affair of 1415–1420: Goms, Brig, Visp, Raron, Leuk, Siders. The seventh tithing was Sion itself, which joined the Republic in 1628 after the bishop was forced to relinquish his de facto rule, retaining his feudal position of prince-bishop only in name.

The six districts of the Lower Valais were known as "banners" (vexilla): Conthey, Ardon, Saillon, Martigny, Entremont, Saint-Maurice (with three separate lordships of the banner of Entremont: Saint-Pierre, Orsières, Bagnes). They only came to be referred to as dizains as they acceded to the Rhodanic Republic and the Swiss canton, during 1802–1815:

- Monthey, Saint-Maurice and Entremont were added in 1798 (Helvetic Republic);
- Martigny (including Saillon) and Hérémence in 1802 (Rhodanic Republic);
- Conthey (including Ardon) in 1815 (Swiss Confederacy).

== See also ==
- Flags and arms of cantons of Switzerland
