= Star (heraldry) =

Heraldic symbol

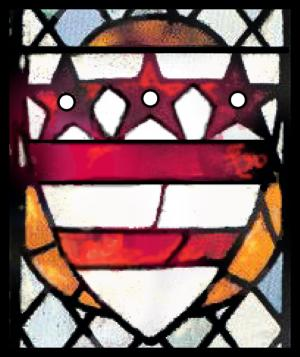
The Washington coat of arms at Selby Abbey in North Yorkshire (mid 15th century)

In heraldry, the term star may refer to any star-shaped charge with any number of rays, which may appear straight or wavy, and may or may not be pierced. While there has been much confusion between the two due to their similar shape, a star with straight-sided rays is usually called a mullet in English heraldry, while one with wavy rays is usually called an estoile.

While a mullet may have any number of points, it is presumed to have five unless otherwise specified in the blazon, and pierced mullets are common; estoiles, however, are presumed to have six rays and (as of 1909) had not been found pierced. In Scottish heraldry, an estoile is the same as in English heraldry, but mullet refers only to a mullet pierced (also called a spur revel), while one that is not pierced is called a star.

== Terminology ==
The use of the word star in blazons, and how that charge appears in coat armory, varies from one jurisdiction to another. In Scots heraldry, both star and mullet interchangeably mean a star with five straight rays; the official record from 1673 gives Murray of Ochtertyre azur three Starrs argent ... (Public Register, vol 1 p 188), while the Ordinary of Arms produced by a late 19th century Lyon King of Arms 'modernizes' the original as Az. three mullets arg. .... In Canadian heraldry the usual term is mullet, but there is also the occasional six-pointed star (e.g. in Vol. IV, at p. 274 and in online version of the Canadian Public Register), which is what others would blazon as a six-pointed mullet. The United States Army Institute of Heraldry, the official heraldic authority in the United States, uses the term mullet in its blazons, but elsewhere, as in US government documents describing the flag of the United States and the Great Seal of the United States, the term star is constantly used, and these nearly always appear with five straight-sided points.

The term mullet or molet refers to a star with straight sides, typically having five or six points, but may have any number of points specified in the blazon. If the number of points is not specified, five points are presumed in Gallo-British heraldry, and six points are presumed in German-Nordic heraldry.

Unlike estoiles, mullets have straight (rather than wavy) rays and may have originally represented the rowel of a spur, rather than a celestial star. The term is said to be derived from French molette, a spur-rowel, although it was in use in heraldry even before rowel spurs.

The term estoile refers to wavy-sided stars, usually of six points, though they may also be blazoned with a different number of points, often eight (e.g. "Portsmouth County Council" pictured here), and many variants feature alternating straight and wavy rays (e.g. "Honford" pictured here). The term derives from Old French estoile 'star', in reference to a celestial star (cf. Modern French étoile), from Latin stella 'star'.

Mullet (English type)

Mullet (German type)

Mullet of six points pierced

Estoile

== Classical heraldry ==
Stars are comparatively rare in European heraldry during the medieval period. An early reference of dubious historicity is reported by Johannes Letzner, who cites Conradus Fontanus (an otherwise unknown authority) to the effect that one Curtis von Meinbrechthausen, a knight of Saxony, in 1169 after committing a murder lost his rank and arms, described as an eight-pointed star beneath a chevron. In Scotland, the armigers of Clan Murray and Clan Douglas used arms with stars as early as the 12th or 13th century. Examples of stars in a late medieval heraldry of the Holy Roman Empire include those of Wentz von Niederlanstein (1350), Gemm (attested 1352), Geyer von Osterberg (1370), Enolff Ritter von Leyen (d. 1392).

Under the system of cadency in use in England and Ireland since the late 15th century, a third son bears a mullet (unpierced) as a difference.

Stars become much more popular as heraldic charges in the early modern era, especially in then-recent family coats of arms of burghers and patricians, as well as in coats of arms of cities (e.g. Maastricht, Bozen, Kaufbeuren). The coat of arms of Valais originates in the 16th century, when seven stars representing its Seven Tithings were added to the party per pale coat of arms of the Bishop of Sion. Of the higher nobility in Siebmachers Wappenbuch (1605), the landgrave of Hessen and the counts of Waldeck and Erbach have stars in their coats of arms, as do several Swiss knights.

Examples of stars in heraldry

Municipal arms of Thury-sous-Clermont in France

Coat of arms of Valga County, Estonia

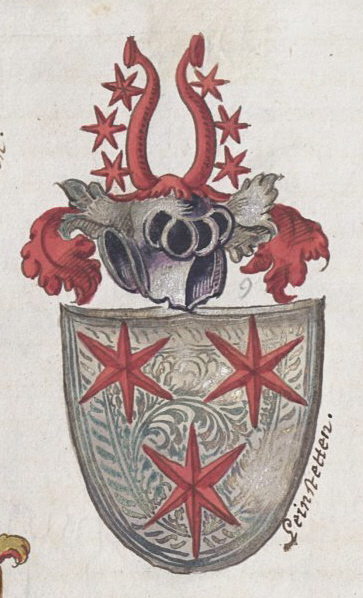
Coat of arms from the Zimmerische Chronik

Arms of Alfoz de Quintanadueñas

Coat of arms of the de Béthune family

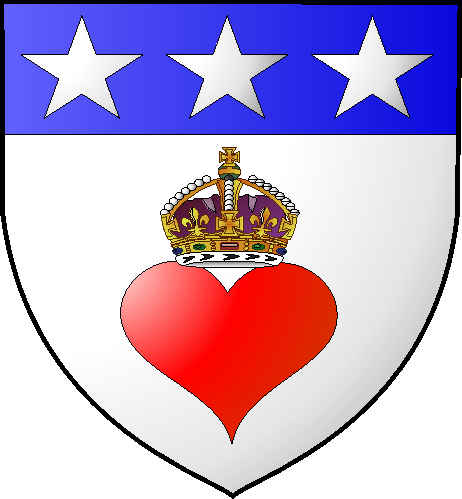
Coat of arms of the Douglas family

Coat of arms of the Székelys, depicting a "sun-star"

== By country ==
=== Italy ===
Emblem of Italy, with the central Stella d'Italia. The emblem, shaped as a Roman wreath, comprises a white five-pointed star, the Stella d'Italia (English: "Star of Italy"), which is the oldest national symbol of Italy, since it dates back to the Graeco-Roman tradition.

The Stella d'Italia ("Star of Italy"), popularly known as Stellone d'Italia ("Great Star of Italy"), is a five-pointed white star, which has symbolized Italy for many centuries. It is the oldest national symbol of Italy, since it dates back to Graeco-Roman mythology when Venus, associated with the West as an evening star, was adopted to identify the Italian peninsula. From an allegorical point of view, the Stella d'Italia metaphorically represents the shining destiny of Italy.

In the early 16th century it began to be frequently associated with Italia turrita, the national personification of the Italian peninsula. The Stella d'Italia was adopted as part of the emblem of Italy in 1947, where it is superimposed on a steel cogwheel, all surrounded by an oak branch and an olive branch. From an allegorical point of view, the Star of Italy metaphorically represents the shining destiny of Italy. Its unifying value is equal to that of the flag of Italy. In 1947, the Stella d'Italia was inserted at the center of the emblem of Italy, which was designed by Paolo Paschetto and which is the iconic symbol identifying the Italian State.

The Italian Star is also recalled by some honors. The Italian Star is recalled by the Colonial Order of the Star of Italy, decoration of the Kingdom of Italy which was intended to celebrate the Italian Empire, as well as by the Order of the Star of Italian Solidarity, the first decoration established by Republican Italy, which was replaced in 2011 by the Order of the Star of Italy, second civil honorary title in importance of the Italian State. The Star of Italy is also recalled by the stars worn on the collars of Italian military uniforms and appears on the figurehead of the Italian Navy. In the civil sphere, the Italian Star is the central symbol of the emblem of the Club Alpino Italiano.

The symbolism of a star associated with Italy first appeared in the writings of the ancient Greek poet Stesicoro, from whom it passed on to poets such as Virgil. The oldest national symbol of Italy, it originated from the combination of Venus, as an evening star, with the West and therefore with the Italian peninsula, one of which was Esperia, or "land of Hesperus, the star of the Evening consecrated to Venus". This symbolism was already attested in archaic Greek literature, in 6th century BC by the poet Stesichorus, in the poem Iliupersis (Fall of Troy) that created the legend of Aeneas which described his return to the land of his ancestors (Italy) after the defeat of Troy, under the leadership of Venus.

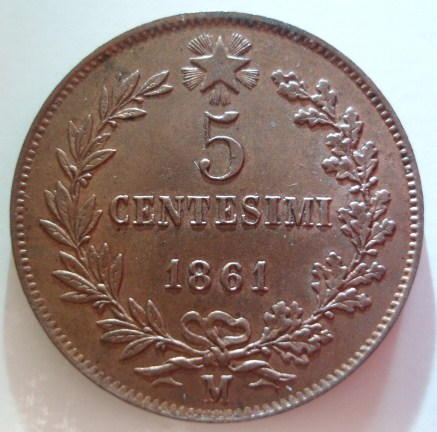
The Stella d'Italia on the first coins of a united Italy

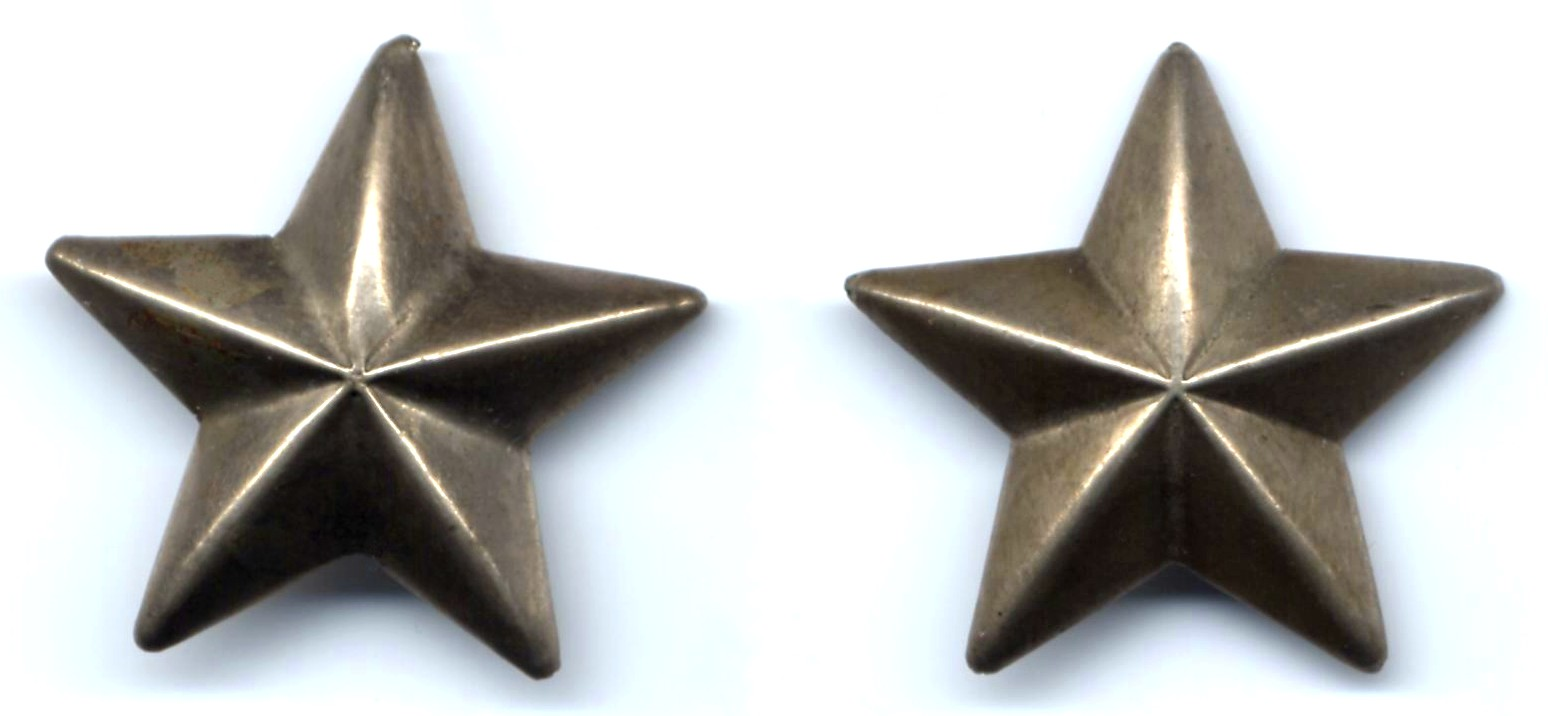
The stars of the uniforms of the Italian Armed Forces, which have their origin in the Stella d'Italia

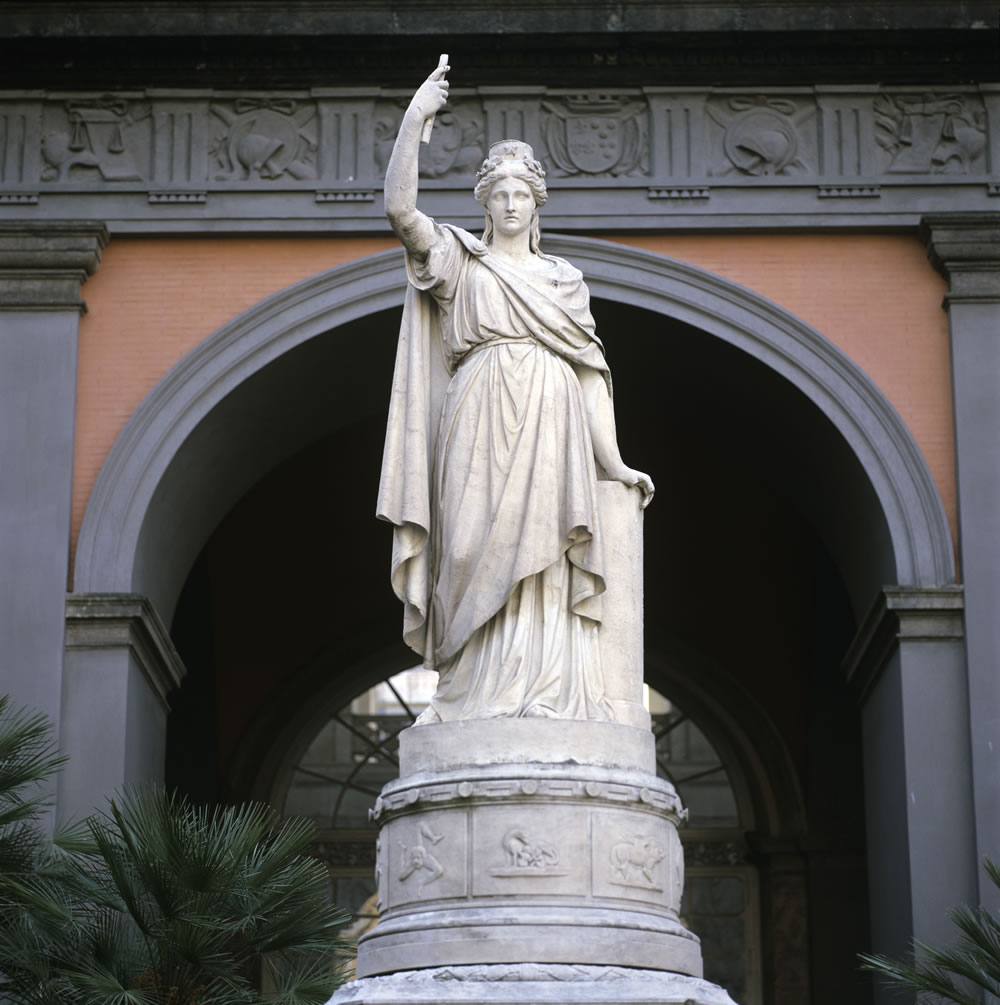
L'Italia turrita e stellata, 1861, Palazzo Reale of Naples. Note the little star on the crown.

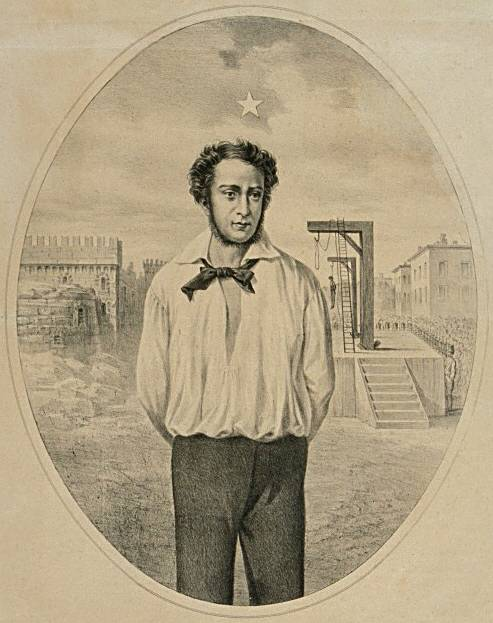
Lithograph of the Italian patriot Ciro Menotti with the Star of Italy above his head (1875).

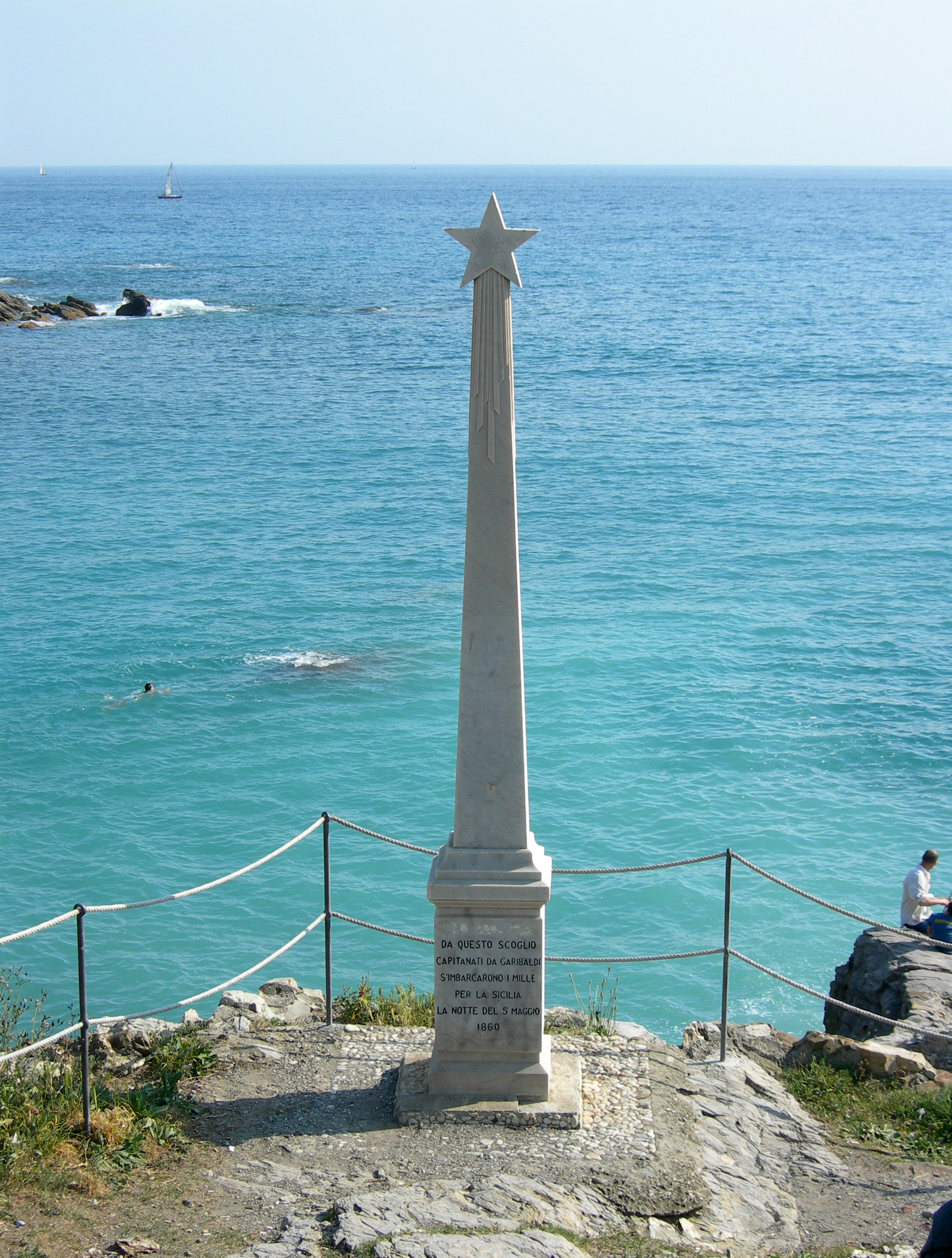
Monument to the Expedition of the Thousand in Quarto dei Mille. Note the star on the top.

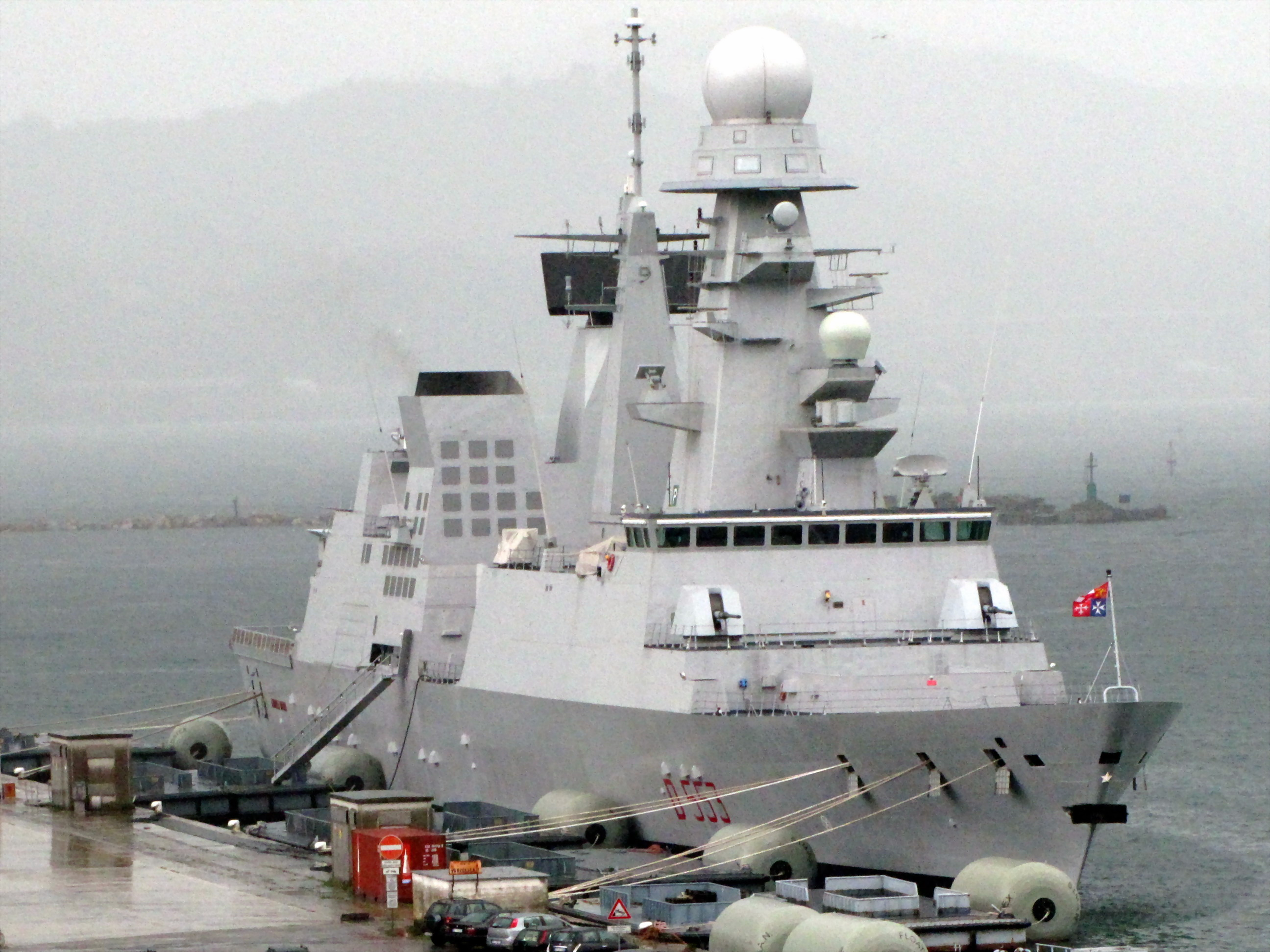
Italian destroyer Andrea Doria (D 553) with the Star of Italy as figurehead.

Coat of arms of the Kingdom of Italy with the star on the top.

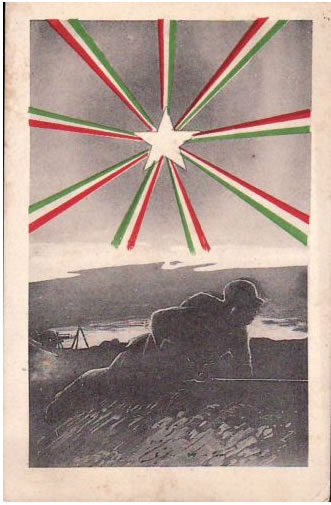
The Stella d'Italia ("Star of Italy") that metaphorically assists the Italian soldier in the trenches in a postcard of World War I

=== United States ===
The American flag as described in the Flag Resolution passed by the Second Continental Congress on 14 June 1777.

Stars are nearly ubiquitous in United States heraldry and vexillology and nearly always appear unpierced with five straight-sided points. In the flag of the United States, each star represents one state. The flag adopted in 1777 is the attributed origin of the thirteen stars, representing the thirteen United States, appearing on the Great Seal since 1780.

A mullet "barbed to chief" appears in the arms of the 240th Signal Battalion of the 40th Infantry Division of the California Army National Guard United States Army.

Examples of stars in US heraldry and vexillology

Coat of arms of the U.S. 16th Field Artillery Regiment.

The Great Seal of the U.S.

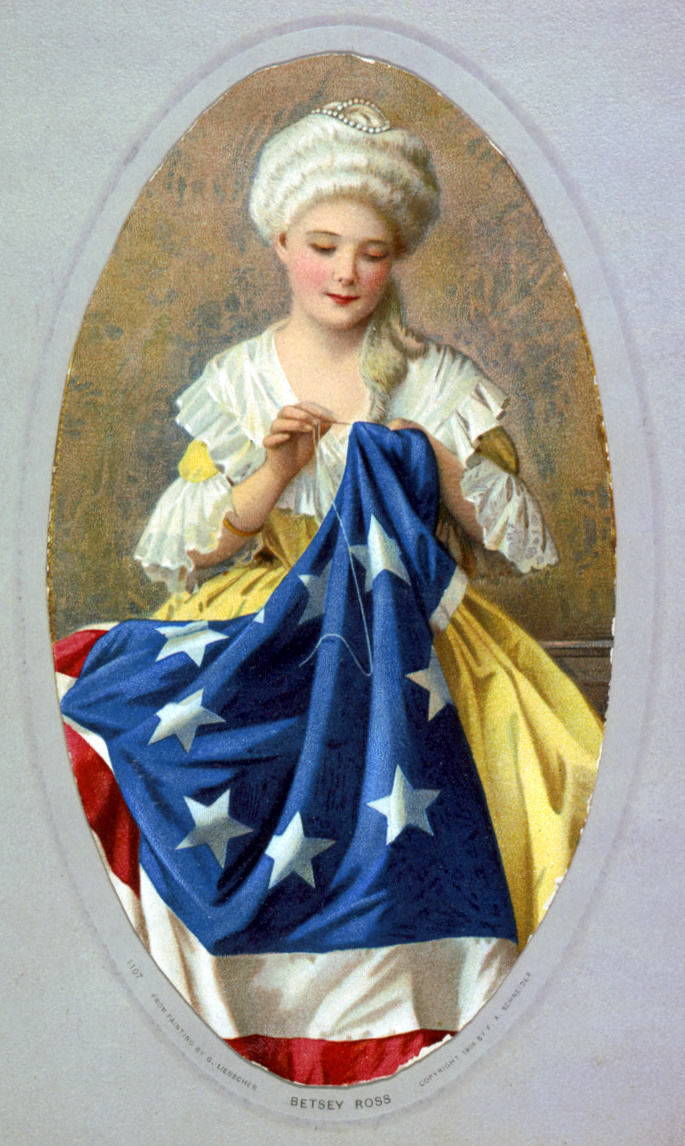
A depiction of Betsy Ross sewing her eponymous flag.

Flag of the city of El Paso.

Flag of Chicago.

== Modern use ==
Flag of Europe

In the design of modern flags and emblems, the stars (mullets, usually five-pointed) when standing alone often represent concepts like "unity" or "independence". When arranged in groups, they often enumerate provinces or other components of the nation (such as ethnic groups). In the flags of Nauru and the Marshall Islands, this enumeration is done by the points of a single star rather than by multiple number of stars.

Some flags of countries on the southern hemisphere show a depiction of the Southern Cross consisting of four or five stars. The star and crescent symbol is found in flags of states succeeding the Ottoman Empire, which used flags with this symbol during 1793-1923.

The twelve stars on the Flag of Europe (1955) symbolize unity.

The green five-pointed star on the Esperanto flag (1890) symbolizes the five inhabited continents.

The 50 stars of the US flag is the largest number on any national flag. The second-largest is 27, on the flag of Brazil.

The current national flags featuring stars include:

Flag	Date	# of stars	Points	Stars represent	Description/comment
United States	1777; 1960	50	5	enumerate US states	originally 13 stars, 50 stars since 1960, see timeline of the flag of the United States
Chile	1817	1	5	ideal	"The star represents a guide to progress and honor"
Brazil	1822; 1992	27	5	enumerate States of Brazil	originally 19 stars, 27 stars since 1992, see Flag of Brazil
Tunisia	1831; 1956	1	5	star and crescent	based on the Ottoman flag
Turkey	1844; 1936	1	5	star and crescent	the Republic of Turkey was established in 1923 and its Flag Law was passed in 1936, declaring the continued use of the Ottoman flag that had been flown since 1844 (an earlier variant with an eight-pointed star dates to ca. 1793).
Cuba	1849; 1902	1	5	ideal	"The white star in the triangle stands for independence". Based on the flag carried by Narciso López in 1850.
Venezuela	1859; 1930	8	5	enumerate provinces	various arrangement of the stars in design changes since 1859. Twenty stars during 1859–1863.
Italy	1861	1	5	from an allegorical point of view, it represents the shining destiny of Italy.	the Stella d'Italia ("Star of Italy"), popularly known as Stellone d'Italia ("Great Star of Italy"), is a five-pointed white star, which has symbolized Italy for many centuries. It is the oldest national symbol of Italy, since it dates back to Graeco-Roman mythology when Venus, associated with the West as an evening star, was adopted to identify the Italian peninsula.
Honduras	1866	5	5	enumerate provinces	based on the flag of the Federal Republic of Central America. The five stars also represent the historical provinces of that state, not subdivisions of Honduras itself.
New Zealand	1869; 1902	4	5	Southern Cross	used as a governmental ensign since 1869, made the official national flag in 1902. Designed by Albert Hastings Markham under a request from Governor George Bowen.
Puerto Rico	1895; 1952	1	5	ideal	The white star in the triangle represents the island of Puerto Rico. Based on the design of the Cuban flag, see Flag of Puerto Rico
Philippines	1898	3	5	enumerate island groups	the three stars represent the three major geographical island groups that compose the Philippines: Luzon, Visayas and Mindanao.
Australia	1901	6	7; 5	Southern Cross; Commonwealth Star	seven-pointed stars for the Commonwealth Star and the main stars of the constellation, plus a smaller five-pointed star representing Epsilon Crucis. Based on the winning design in the 1901 Federal Flag Design Competition.
Azerbaijan	1918	1	8	star and crescent	"the eight-pointed star points to the eight letters of the name Azerbaijan (in Arabic script)"
Panama	1925	2	5	ideal	"the blue star stands for the purity and honesty of the life of the country; the red star represents the authority and law in the country"
Jordan	1928	1	7	ideal	"The seven points symbolize the seven verses of the first surah of the Qur’an. The seven points also represent faith in one God, humanity, humility, national spirit, virtue, social justice, and aspiration. The star also stands for the unity of the Arab nation."
Vietnam	1945	1	5	ideal	the Communist Star; "The five-pointed yellow star represents the unity of workers, peasants, intellectuals, traders and soldiers in building socialism"
Pakistan	1947	1	5	ideal	the star represents "light". The crescent and star symbolize progress and light respectively.
North Korea	1948	1	5	ideal	the Communist Star
People's Republic of China	1949	5	5	ideal	"Five-starred Red Flag" (五星红旗, Wǔxīng Hóngqí), one large star representing the Communist Party surrounded by four smaller ones depicting the four then social classes
Samoa	1949	5	5	Southern Cross	
Somalia	1954	1	5	ideal	"Star of Unity"
European Union	1955; 1985	12	5	ideal	"unity among Europeans". Believed to also be a reference to the Catholic iconographic tradition of showing the Blessed Virgin Mary as the Woman of the Apocalypse, wearing a "crown of twelve stars".
Ghana	1957	1	5	ideal	"the lodestar of African freedom"
Central African Republic	1958	1	5	ideal	The star "guides the steps of the Central African people towards freedom and emancipation."
Syria	1930; 1961; 2011; 2024	3	5	enumerate states	The flag was that of the First Syrian Republic and the Syrian Opposition before the fall of the Assad regime government change in 2024. The first star represented Aleppo, Damascus, and Deir Ezzor, with the other stars representing Latakia and Jebel Druze.
Mauritania	1959	1	5	star and crescent	
Senegal	1960	1	5		The five points of the star are said to recall the human ideogram which was displayed in the middle of the flag of the former Mali Federation.
Togo	1960	1	5	ideal	"hope"
Algeria	1962	1	5	star and crescent	
Malaysia	1963	1	14	enumerate states	a 14-pointed star alongside a crescent, representing the 13 member states plus the federal government
Singapore	1965	5	5	ideal	five stars alongside a crescent, representing "democracy, peace, progress, justice and equality". According to Lee Kuan Yew, the Chinese population wanted five stars (influenced by the flag of the People's Republic of China) and the Muslim population wanted a crescent moon.
Burundi	1967	3	6	ideal	"Unity, Work, Progress"
Nauru	1967	1	12	enumerate tribes	
Papua New Guinea	1971	5	5	Southern Cross	
Guinea-Bissau	1973	1	5	ideal	"the Black Star of Africa"
Grenada	1974	7	5	enumerate parishes	
Angola	1975	1	5	ideal	in origin imitating the Communist Star
Cameroon	1975	1	5	ideal	"star of unity"
Suriname	1975	1	5	ideal	"The star represents the unity of all ethnic groups"
São Tomé and Príncipe	1975	2	5	enumerate islands	
Tuvalu	1976	9	5	enumerate islands	The stars are arranged in imitation of the geographic location of the islands of Tuvalu
Djibouti	1977	1	5	ideal	"The red star signifies the unity of the diverse state."
Solomon Islands	1977	5	5	enumerate islands	
Dominica	1978	10	5	enumerate parishes	
Marshall Islands	1979	1	24	enumerate districts	the points of the stars enumerate the electoral districts
Federated States of Micronesia	1979	4	5	enumerate states	Based on the Flag of the US Trust Territory of the Pacific, each star represents a constitutional State (Yap, Chuuk, Pohnpei, and Kosrae)
Saint Kitts and Nevis	1983	2	5	ideal / enumerate islands	"hope and liberty, or Saint Kitts and Nevis"
Burkina Faso	1984	1	5	ideal	"the guiding light of the revolution"
Croatia	1990	2	6	morning star	The stars are part of the coat of arms of Croatia. One star is part of the coat of arms of the Illyrian movement, and the other is part of the coat of arms of Slavonia.
Slovenia	1991	3	6	ideal	"democracy", inspired by the historical coat of arms of the Counts of Celje
Uzbekistan	1991	12	5	ideal	a crescent and twelve stars, representing the "ancient calendar cycle"
Tajikistan	1992	7	5	seven stars on heaven's mountains	
Cape Verde	1992	10	5	enumerate islands	
Bosnia and Herzegovina	1998	8 ("∞")	5	ideal	a diagonal line of seven five-pointed stars, plus two half-stars cut off by the flag boundary. The stars represent "Europe" and are intended to be "infinite" in number.
Comoros	2001	4	5	enumerate islands	four stars alongside a crescent
Turkmenistan	2001	5	5	enumerate provinces	five stars alongside a crescent
Timor-Leste	2002	1	5	ideal	"the light that guides"
South Sudan	2005	1	5	ideal	"the Star of Bethlehem, represents the unity of the states of South Sudan"
Democratic Republic of the Congo	2007	1	5	ideal	derived from the flag of Congo Free State (1885)
Myanmar	2010	1	5	ideal	"unity"

Not bearing heraldic stars as such, the 1915 Flag of Morocco and the 1996 flag of Ethiopia have a pentagram each, and the 1948 flag of Israel a hexagram or "star of David". The 1962 Flag of Nepal has what would technically be described as a 12-pointed mullet, but is intended to depict the Sun.

== See also ==
- Category:Star symbols
- Rayed solar symbol
- Star and crescent
- Sun (heraldry)

== Bibliography ==
- Bazzano, Nicoletta (2011). Donna Italia. L'allegoria della Penisola dall'antichità ai giorni nostri (in Italian). Angelo Colla Editore. ISBN 978-88-96817-06-3.
- Rossi, Girolamo (2014). Lo scudo crociato. Un simbolo medievale nella comunicazione politica del Novecento (in Italian). Armando Editore. ISBN 978-88-96817-06-3.
