= Battle of Berne =

The Battle of Berne may refer to:

- Battle of Grauholz (1798), sometimes referred to as the Battle of Berne, a battle during the French invasion of Switzerland
- Battle of Berne (1954 FIFA World Cup), an infamous 1958 World Cup quarter-final match between Brazil and Hungary
