= Republic of the Seven Tithings =

State in early modern Switzerland

Republic of the Seven Tithings Republik der Sieben Zenden (German) République des Sept-Dizains (French)
- 1571–1798
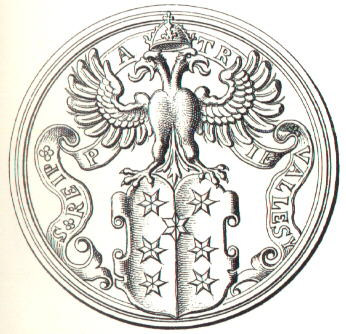
- Banner of arms 1582 seal (S(igillum) REIP(ublice) PATRIE VALLESY)

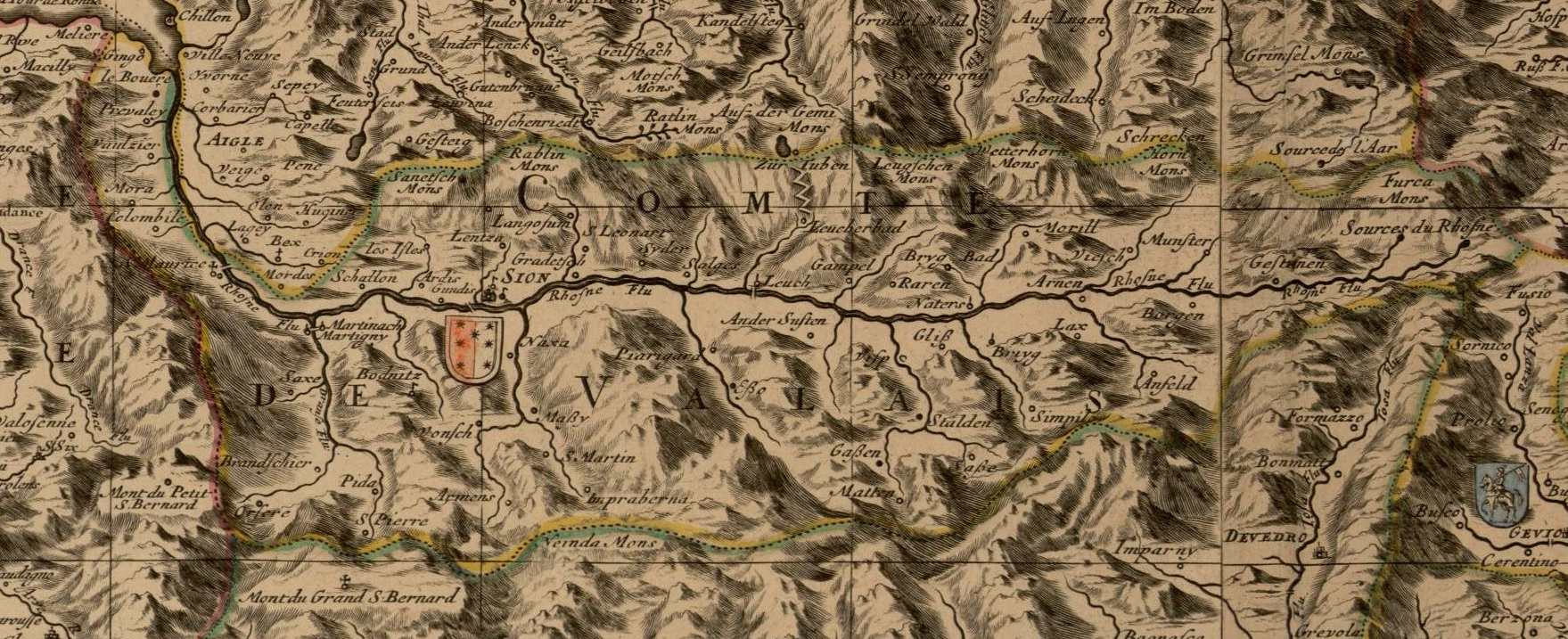
- Map of the Valais, detail from a 1693 map of the Old Swiss Confederacy and its associates by Guillaume Sanson.

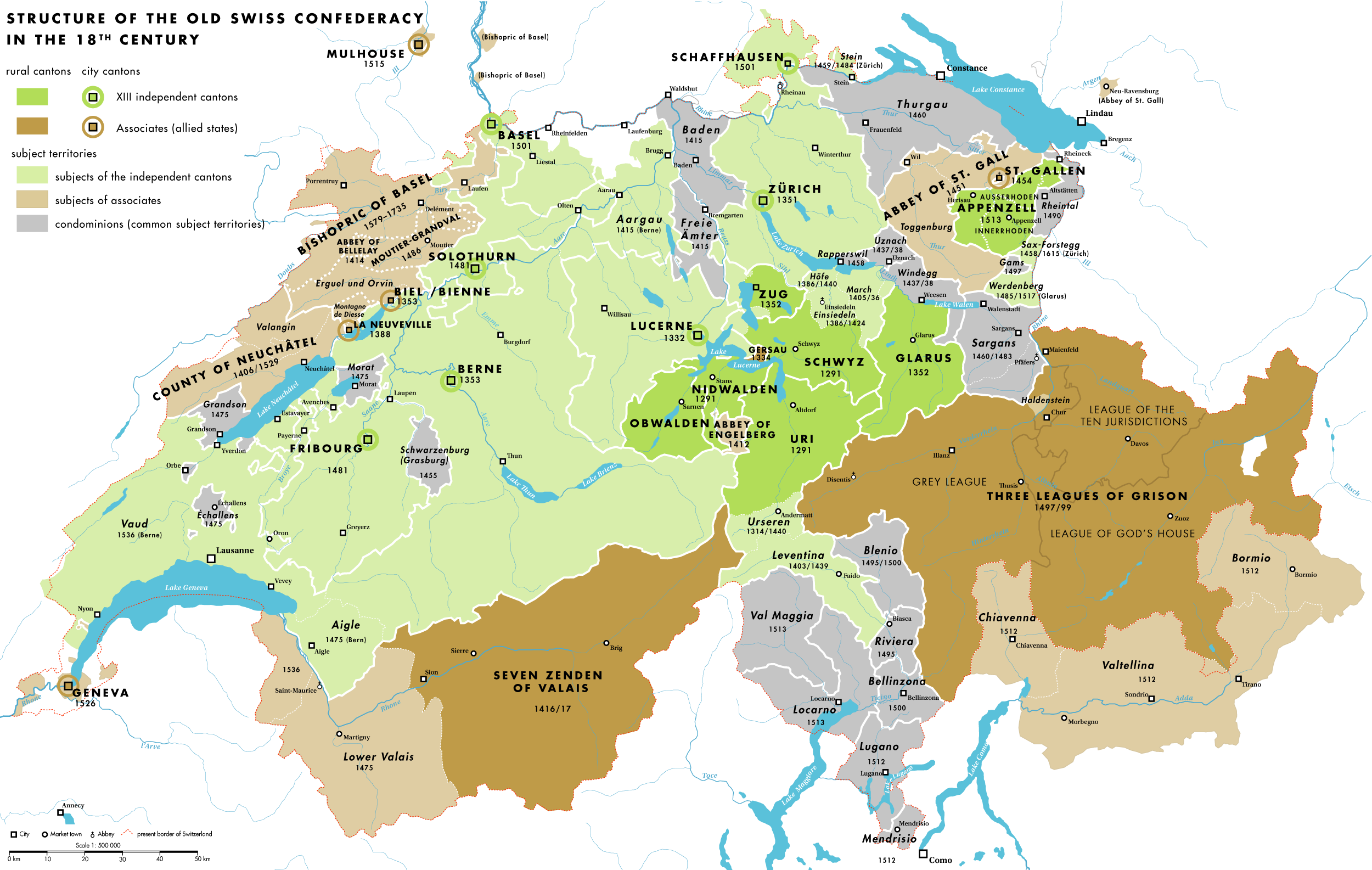
- The Swiss Confederacy in the 18th century, showing the "Seven Zenden of Valais", along with subject Lower Valais, as an associate state of the Confederacy
- Status: Associated to the Confederation
- Capital: Sion
- Official languages: German
- Regional languages: French
- Government: Federal republic
- Landeshauptmann
  - 1571–1573: Moriz Zum Brunnen (first de facto)
  - 1790–1798: Jakob Valentin Sigristen (last)
- Legislature: Diet
- Historical era: Early modern period
  - Zehndenherrschaft (Republic): 1571
  - declaration of independence: 1613
  - de jure independence: 1634
  - Incorporated into the Helvetic Republic: 1798
| Preceded by | Succeeded by |
| Prince-bishopric of Sion | Helvetic Republic |
- Today part of: Switzerland

The Republic of the Seven Tithings (German: Republik der Sieben Zenden, French: République des Sept-Dizains) was a state in what is now the Swiss canton of Valais during the early modern period, and an associate of the Old Swiss Confederacy.

The seven tithings (Zenden, dizains, Latin: decumae) of the Central and Upper Valais, listed orographically, were Goms, Brig, Visp, Raron, Leuk, Siders, and Sion. The six districts of the Lower Valais, known as "banners" (vexilla), were ruled as subject lands by the Republic. They only came to be referred to as dizains as they acceded to the Rhodanic Republic and the Swiss canton, during 1802–1815.

== History ==
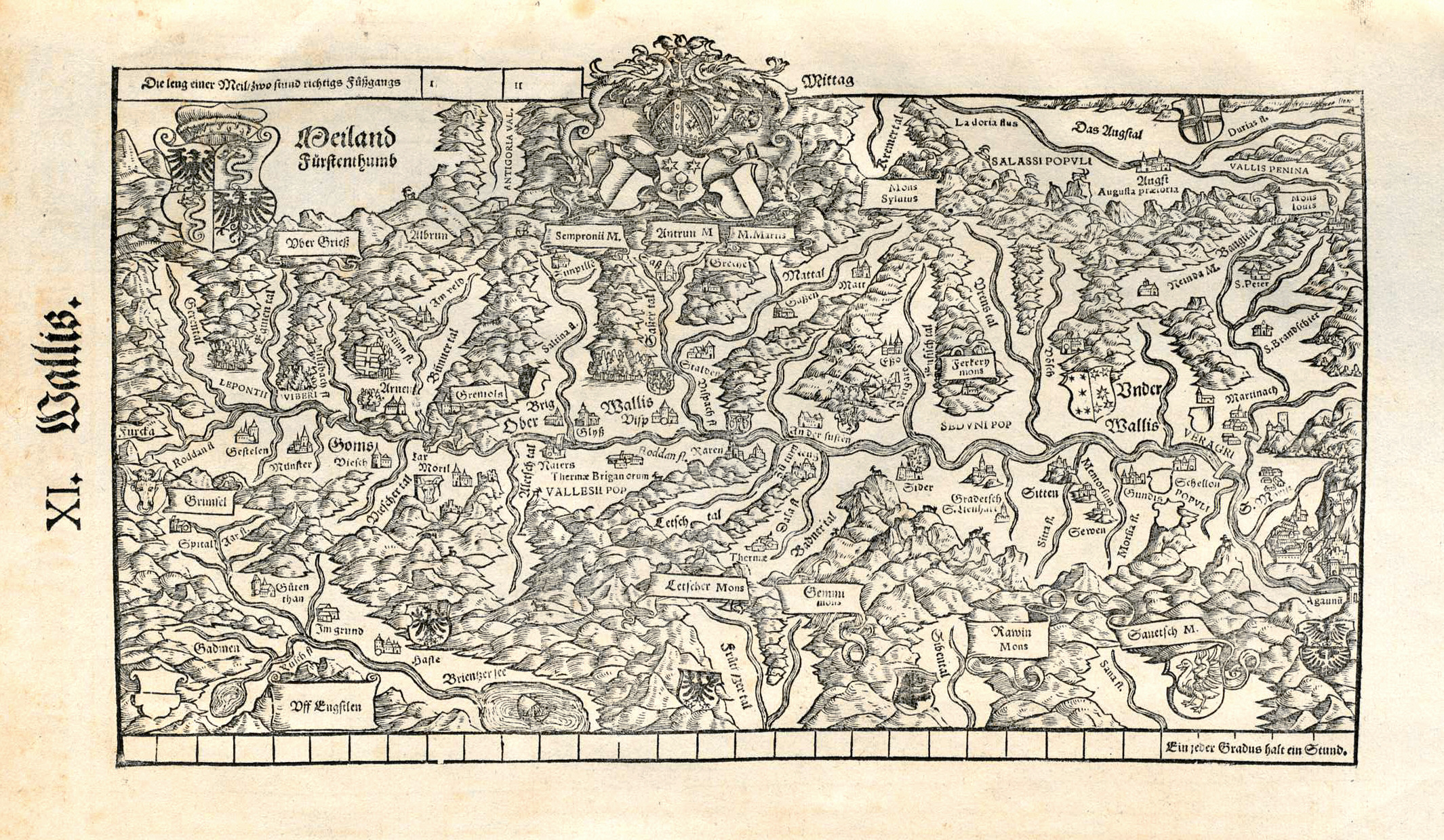
Map of the Valais by Johannes Stumpf, printed by Christoph Froschauer in 1548. The first map of the Valais was drawn by Johannes Schalbetter and printed by Sebastian Münster in 1545.

The tithings (Zehnden) of the Upper Valais emerged as medieval communes, which were granted certain privileges by Charles IV in 1353. These territories had enjoyed de facto independence since the mid-15th century, as a result of the Raron affair, and they continued to grow in power and influence over the following two centuries. They seized much of the Lower Valais formerly controlled by the House of Savoy in 1475. This happened in the context of the Burgundian Wars, and with the agreement of both the bishop of Sion and the canton of Bern. The tithings gained further autonomy as a result of the conflict with bishop Matthäus Schiner after the Battle of Marignano (1515). Throughout the 16th century, the tithings, now calling themselves Republica Vallesi, acted as a sovereign power without regard to the prince-bishop who was still nominally the feudal ruler of Valais.

In the wake of the Swiss Reformation, Bern occupied Vaud and the city of Geneva in 1535. Anticipating further Bernese aggression, the seven tithings sent their troops to Saint-Maurice to defend their border. As the Bernese advanced to Chablais, the Valais troops crossed the Rhone and advanced along the shore of Lake Geneva, onto Savoyard territory, and far as Évian, halting the Bernese advance. Bern agreed to return the occupied territory to Savoy in 1564. The Valais refused to do the same, but eventually agreed to return Evian and Hochtal, keeping Monthey as their subject territory. The constitutional establishment of the Zendenherrschaft (sovereignty of the tithings) dates to 1571, but the conflict between the prince-bishops and the communes simmered on into the 17th century. The Reformation began to spread to Sion and Leuk in the 1580s. The bishop attempted to suppress this, from 1603 aided by the tithings, by the Catholic Swiss cantons and by France. In 1604, adherents of the Reformation were forced to either re-convert to Catholicism or to emigrate.

By the beginning 17th century, the seven tithings had gained complete sovereignty de facto, and in 1613, the Diet (German: Landrat, French: Diète), a council of representatives of tithings and parishes, formally declared independence from the prince-bishop. In 1613, bishop Hildebrand Jost was forced to forfeit his claim on the tithings, at first temporarily, then permanently in 1634, marking the beginning of the de jure sovereignty of the tithings and the end of the secular power of the prince-bishops.

The communes of the Valais first referred to themselves as a democratic Republic in a document of 1619; the distinctive seven-star coat of arms which forms the basis of the current cantonal coat of arms dates to 1628. From this time until the French invasion of 1798, the bishops of Sion retained their title of prince-bishops of the Holy Roman Empire only in name, being constitutionally bound to submit to the decisions of the Diet.

== Successors ==
The République des Sept-Dizains was abolished, and merged with its former subject Lower Valais, declared as the short lived (16 March to 1 May 1798) République du Valais, which was in turn incorporated as the canton of Valais of the Helvetic Republic, but in 1802 again seceded as the French client state of the Rhodanic Republic, which in 1810 became part of the French département of Simplon before in 1815 joining the restored Swiss Confederacy as a canton.

== See also ==
- History of Valais
- Early modern Switzerland
