= Karl Ludwig von Erlach =

Swiss military officer (1746–1798)

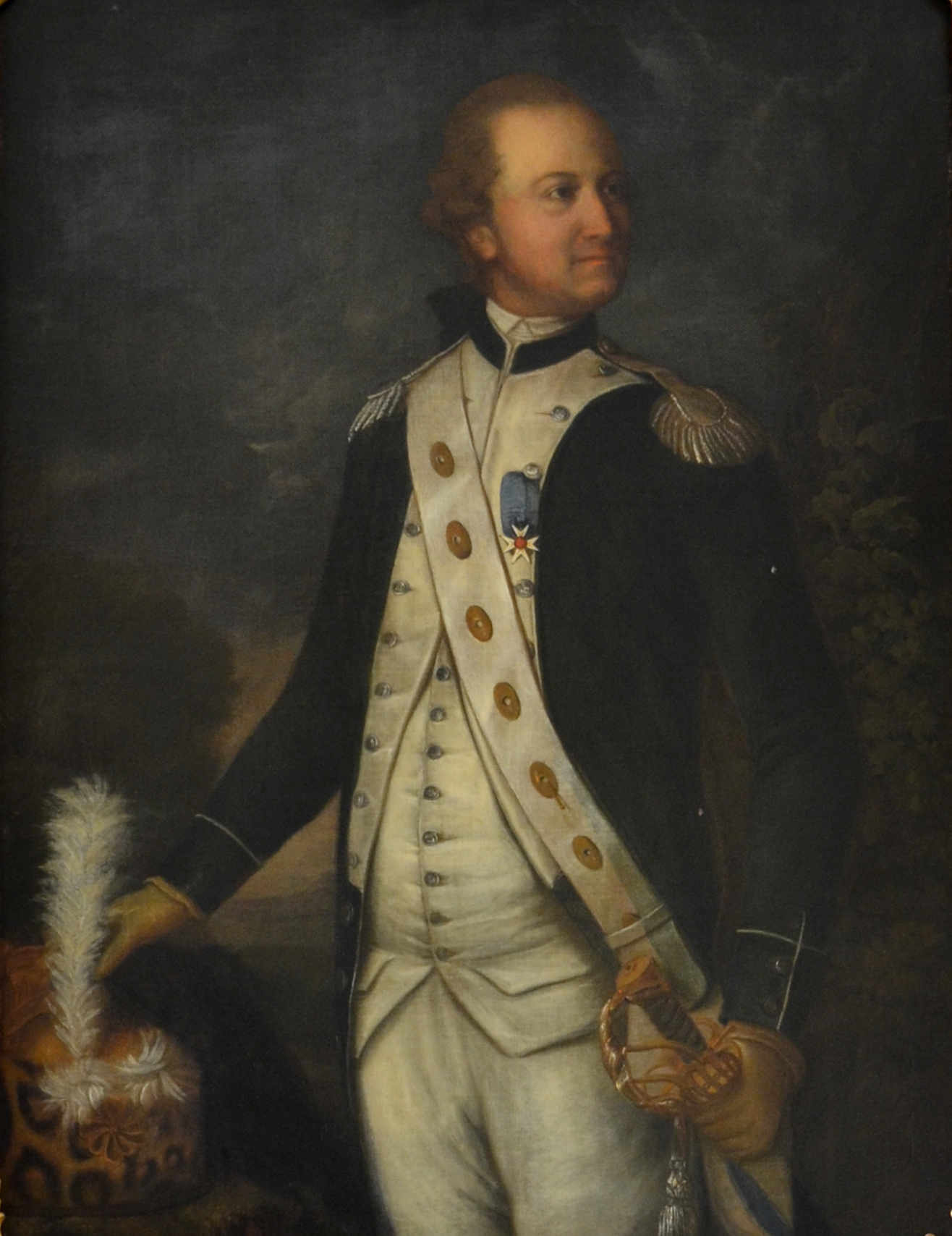
- von Erlach circa 1700s
- Born: 10 November 1746; Bern, Switzerland
- Died: 5 March 1798 (aged 51); Near Wichtrach, Switzerland
- Military career
- Allegiance: Kingdom of France; Old Swiss Confederacy
- Service years: c. 1700s-1798
- Rank: (Kingdom of France) Maréchal de camp (Old Swiss Confederacy) Major-General
- Commands: Swiss Army
- Conflicts: French Revolutionary Wars; French invasion of Switzerland; Battle of Grauholz
- Awards: Knight of the Order of Military Merit
- Other work: Member of the Grand Council of Bern

Karl Ludwig von Erlach (10 November 1746 – 5 March 1798) was a Swiss military officer who commanded the Swiss Army during the French invasion of Switzerland in 1798.

== Biography ==
Erlach was born in Bern into the noble Erlach family. His father, also called Karl Ludwig von Erlach, was a colonel and bailiff. Erlach began his career as an officer of the Swiss Guards in French service. In 1774, he was promoted to colonel and given command of the Schomberg Dragoons regiment, and the next year he was made a Knight of the Order of Military Merit. Erlach reached the rank of maréchal de camp in 1790.

He was a member of the Grand Council of Bern since 1775. In 1791, after returning to Switzerland, Erlach commanded the Bernese troops sent to suppress a revolt in Vaud.

=== Commander of the Swiss Army ===
When Revolutionary France invaded the Swiss Confederation in February 1798, Erlach was appointed supreme commander of the Swiss Army by the Confederation's War Council. Although he developed a defensive plan, Erlach could not implement his strategy due to the interference of the War Council, and was defeated by General Balthazar Schauenburg at the decisive Battle of Grauholz on 5 March. After the battle, Erlach began a retreat to the Bernese Oberland, where he planned to continue resistance against the French. Later that day, near Wichtrach, Erlach was assassinated by his own soldiers, who mistakenly believed him to be a traitor.
