= Hellimer =

- Commune
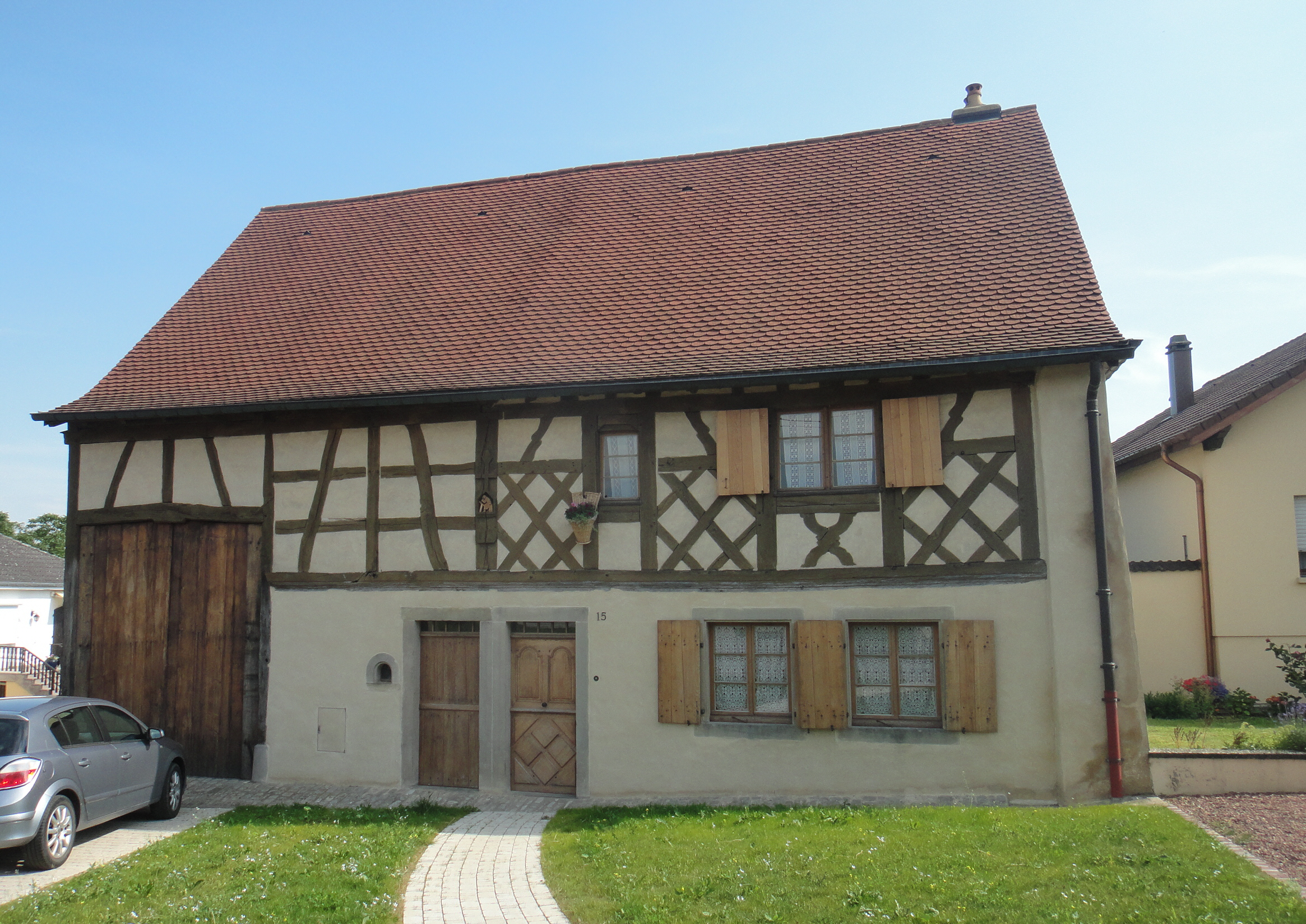
- The Bonert house, in Hellimer

- Coat of arms
- Location of Hellimer
- Location within France Location within Grand Est
- Coordinates: 48°59′54″N 6°49′50″E
- Country: France
- Region: Grand Est
- Department: Moselle
- Arrondissement: Forbach-Boulay-Moselle
- Canton: Sarralbe
- Intercommunality: CA Saint-Avold Synergie

Government
  - Mayor (2020–2026): Romuald Yahiaoui
- Area^{1}: 10.42 km^{2} (4.02 sq mi)
- Elevation: 250 m (820 ft)
- Highest elevation: 334 m (1,096 ft)
- Lowest elevation: 218 m (715 ft)
- Population (2023): 523
  - Density: 50.2/km^{2} (130/sq mi)
- Time zone: UTC+01:00 (CET)
  - Summer (DST): UTC+02:00 (CEST)
- INSEE/Postal code: 57311 /57660
- ^{1} French Land Register data, which excludes lakes, ponds, glaciers > 1 km^{2} (0.386 sq mi or 247 acres) and river estuaries.

Hellimer (French pronunciation: [elimɛʁ]) is a commune in the Moselle department in Grand Est in north-eastern France.

== Notable people ==
- Balthazar Alexis Henri Schauenburg, (also spelled Schauenbourg), was born in Hellimer on 31 July 1748 and died in Geudertheim on 1 September 1831) was a French general who served in the wars of the French Revolution and the Empire.

== See also ==
- Communes of the Moselle department
