= French invasion of Switzerland =

1798 invasion during the French Revolutionary Wars

- Part of the French Revolutionary Wars
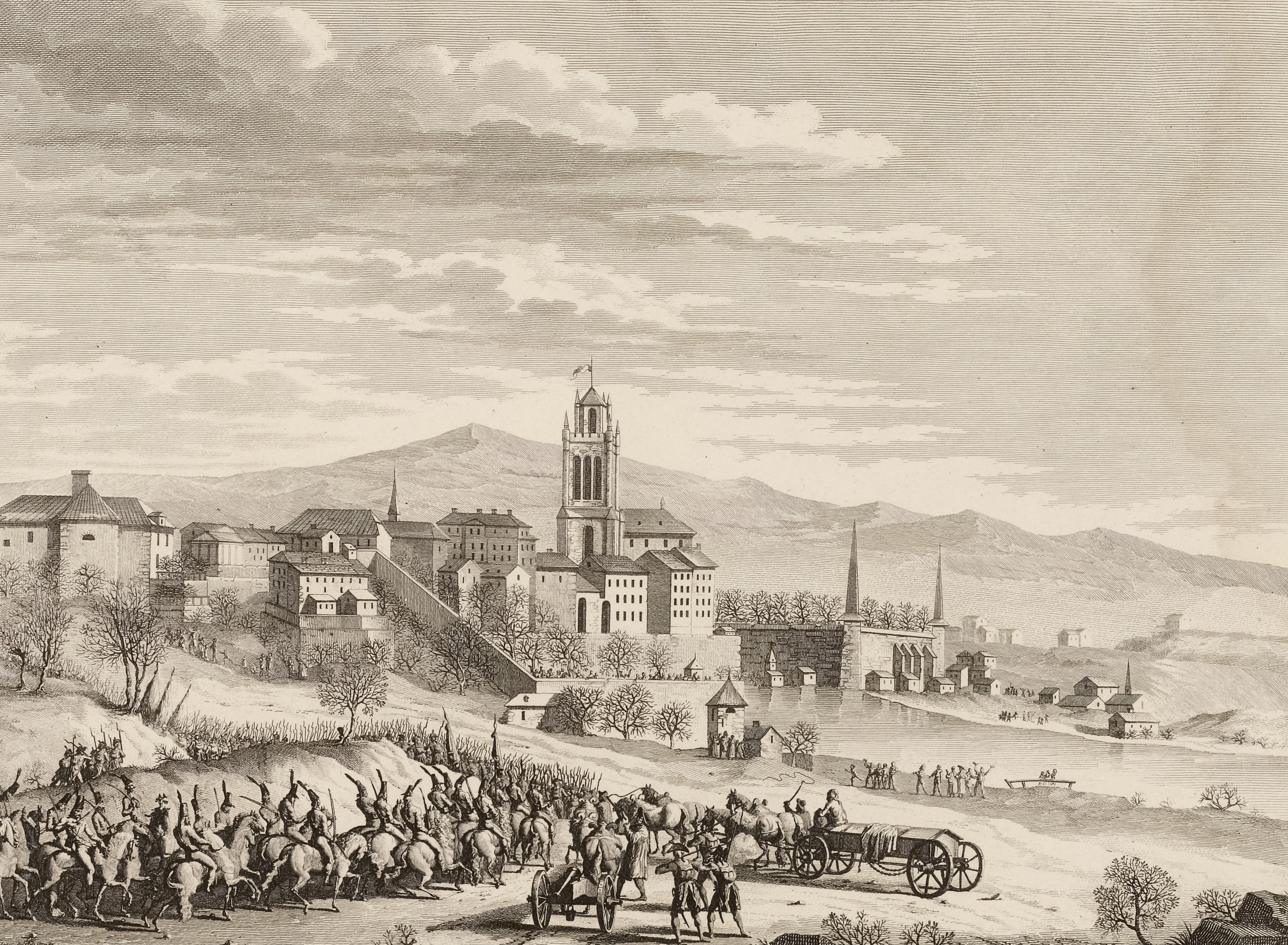
- Entry of the French into Bern on 15 March 1798. Engraving by Abraham Girardet, c. 1798–1803
Date	28 January – 17 May 1798
Location	Old Swiss Confederacy
Result	French victory: Switzerland becomes a French client state

Belligerents
France	Switzerland

Commanders and leaders
Guillaume Brune; Balthazar Alexis Henri Schauenburg; Philippe Romain Ménard	Karl Ludwig von Erlach X; Alois von Reding

Strength
At least 35,000	20,000 (Bern); 10,000 (Schwyz, Nidwalden and Uri)

Casualties and losses
Unknown	700 (Bern)

The French invasion of Switzerland (German: Franzoseneinfall) occurred from January to May 1798 as part of the French Revolutionary Wars. The independent Old Swiss Confederacy collapsed from the invasion and simultaneous internal revolts called the "Helvetic Revolution". The Swiss ancien régime institutions were abolished and replaced by the centralised Helvetic Republic, one of the sister republics of the French First Republic.

== Background ==
Before 1798, the modern canton of Vaud belonged to the canton of Bern, to which it had a subject status. Moreover, the majority of the Francophone Vaudois felt oppressed by German-speaking Bern. Several Vaudois patriots such as Frédéric-César de La Harpe advocated for independence. In 1795, La Harpe called on his compatriots to rise up against the Bernese aristocrats, but his appeal fell to deaf ears, and he had to flee to Revolutionary France, where he resumed his activism.

In late 1797, French general Napoleon Bonaparte, who had just successfully conquered northern Italy and founded the Cisalpine Republic, pressed the French Directory to occupy Switzerland. France's main goal in the invasion was securing access to northern Italy via the Alpine passes, with supplying its war effort and using the military potential of Switzerland as secondary objectives. Due to internal political and social upheaval, the Confederacy could neither reach an arrangement with France nor organize resistance. In September 1797, Switzerland's situation was further aggravated by the removal of François Barthélemy from the Directory, who had defended a position favorable to the Confederacy.

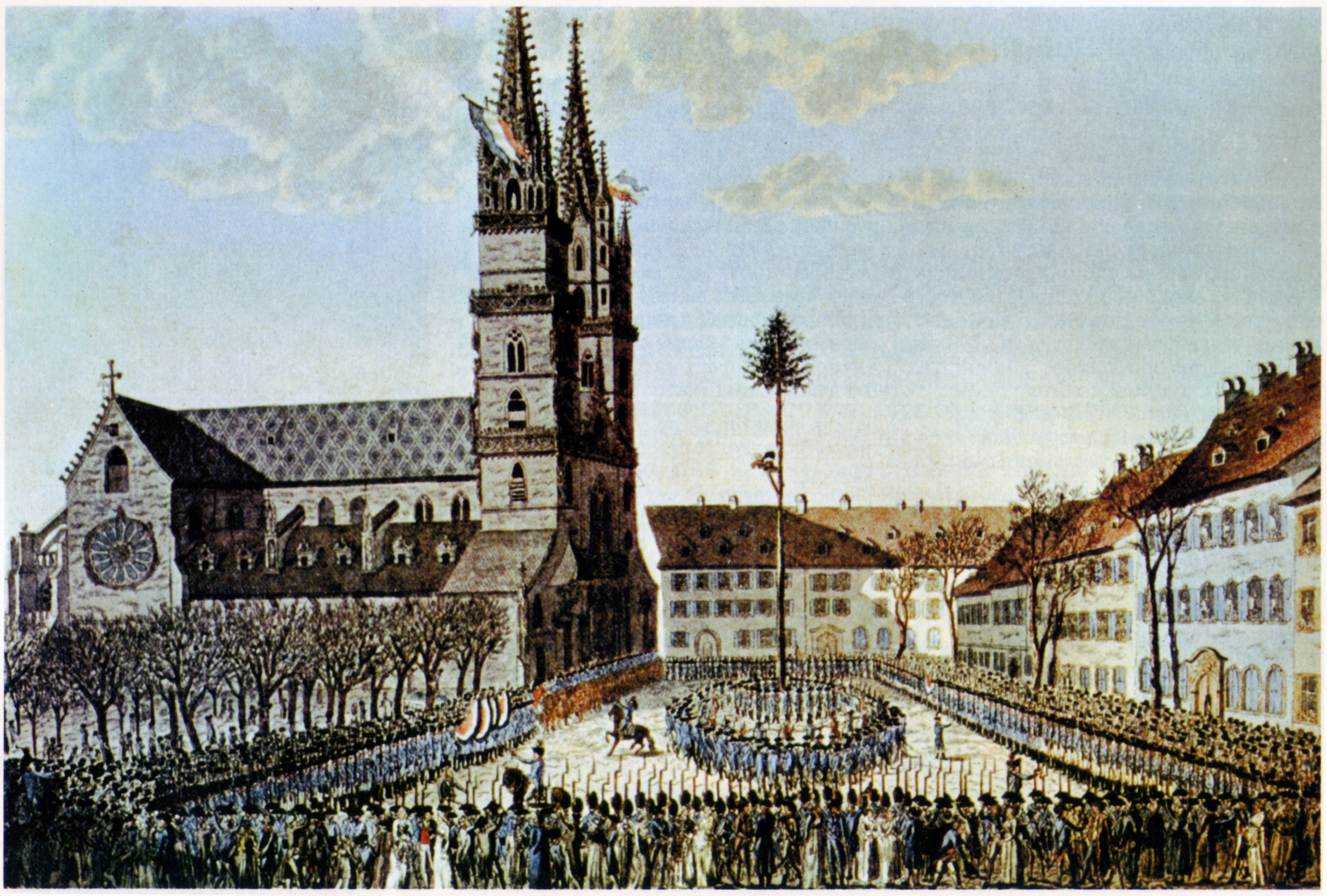
Liberty tree erected in Basel. This act was repeated in other Swiss places to symbolise revolution and liberation.

On 10 October 1797, Valtellina, Chiavenna and Bormio, dependencies of the Three Leagues, revolted and with French support seceded from the Confederacy to join the Cisalpine Republic. In December, the southern part of the Prince-Bishopric of Basel was occupied and annexed to France. Soon 10,000 French troops gathered near Geneva. The atmosphere inside Switzerland had changed significantly due to these developments, and many pro-French patriots hoped, and anti-French conservatives feared, that the Revolution would now spread to the rest of the Confederacy, with or without direct French military intervention. France used the dissatisfaction of the rural elites in the dependencies and the Enlightened citizenry in the cantons to stimulate revolutionary excitement.

The first event of what would become known as the Helvetic Revolution happened with a patriot uprising in Liestal in the canton of Basel on 17 January 1798. The rebels demanded equality before the law, erected a liberty tree and burnt down three Vogtei castles by 23 January. On 24 January, the urban elite of Vaud proclaimed the Lemanic Republic (République lémanique) in Lausanne, which became its seat of government. Next, citizens and subjects in countless Swiss cities, cantons and their dependencies rebelled, and after the example of Vaud, more than 40 other short-lived republics were proclaimed in February, March and April throughout the country.

== Invasion ==
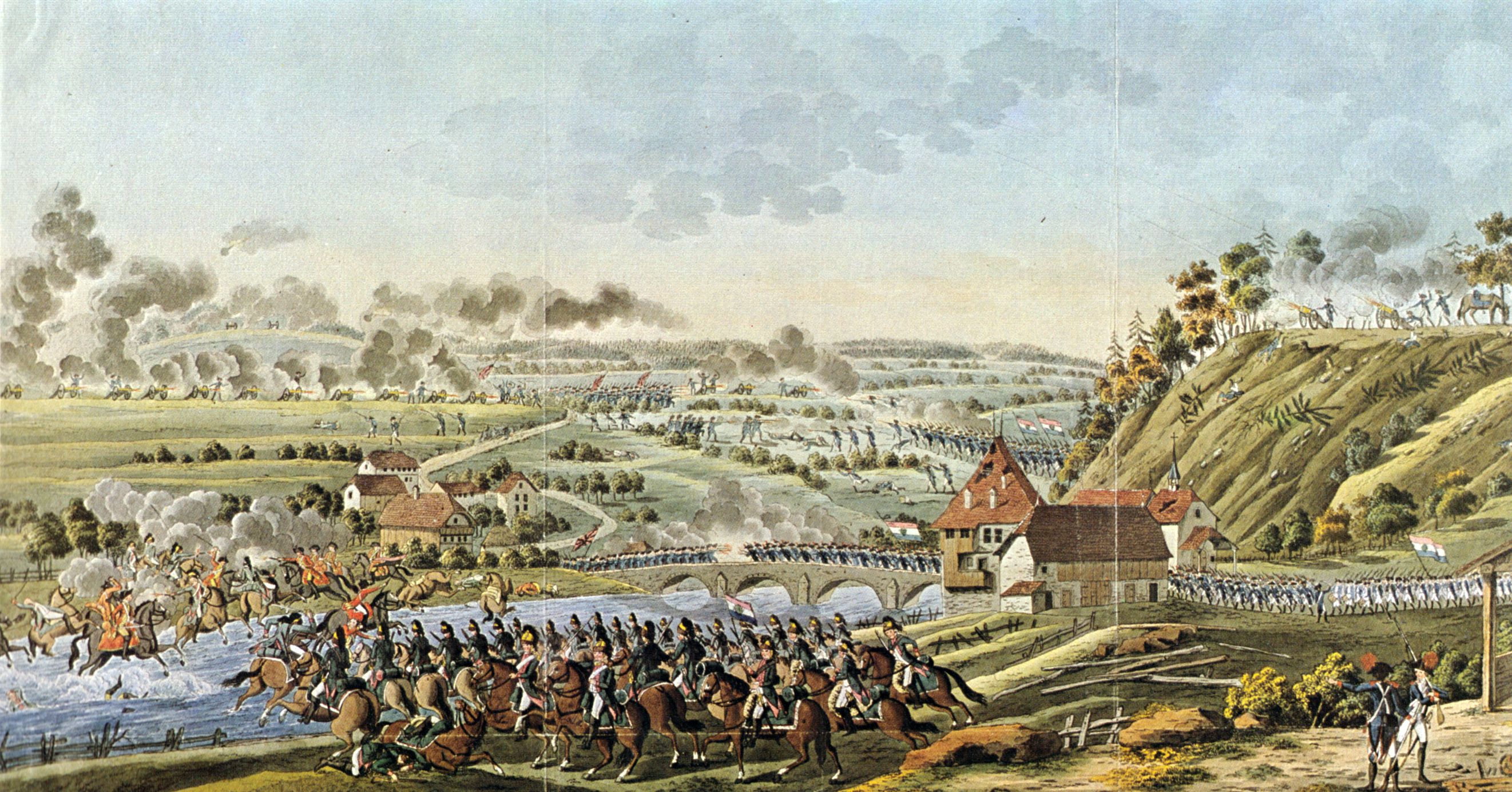
Contemporary drawing of the Battle of Neuenegg, 5 March 1798. Bernese heavy cavalry (in red) mounts an attack against French dragoons on the river Sense.

At the invitation of the Lemanic Republic, 12,000 French troops under General Philippe Romain Ménard invaded Vaud on 28 January. An incident on 25 January, in which two French hussars were killed by Swiss soldiers in Thierrens, was cited as a pretext. They occupied Vaud without resistance and were cheered on by the population, as Bernese troops withdrew to the area of Murten and Fribourg. A second army under General Balthazar Alexis Henri Schauenburg advanced from Mont-Terrible, the former Prince-Bishopric of Basel, towards Bern and demanded its government to put pro-French Revolutionary parties in power. The Bernese refusal to do so was used by the French to justify war. Bernese field marshal Karl Ludwig von Erlach was appointed supreme commander of all Swiss forces, while General Guillaume Brune held the equivalent office over French forces.

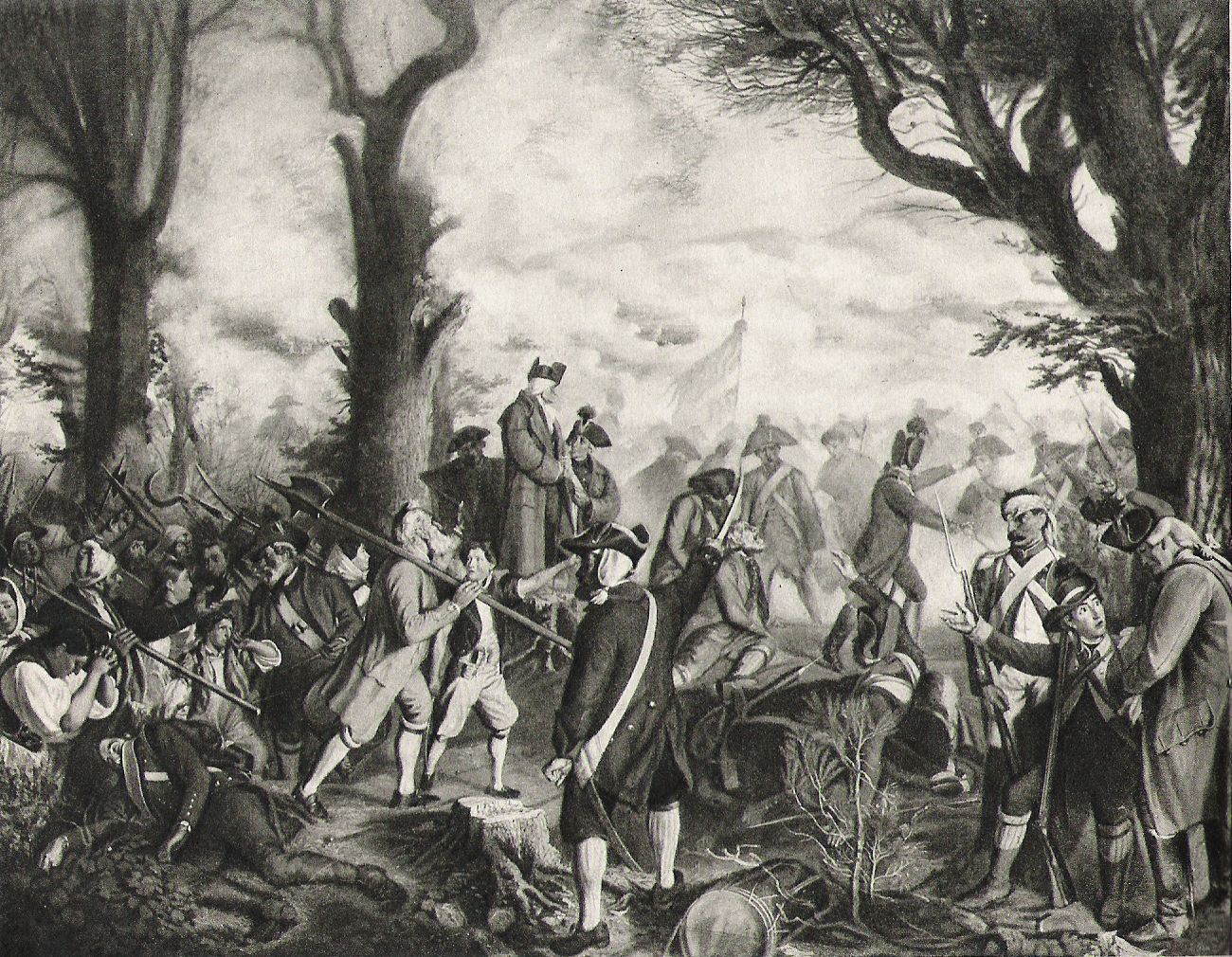
The Last Days of Old Bern, by Friedrich Walthard, depicting the Battle of Grauholz

Fighting began on 1 March, and the next day there were battles around Lengnau, Grenchen and in the Ruhsel forest between Alfermée and Twann, which ended with the surrender of the canton of Solothurn. On 4 March, Bern's government resigned; nevertheless, its troops continued to resist the French advance. The next day, the Bernese were defeated at Fraubrunnen and the French attained a decisive victory at the Battle of Grauholz, confirming Vaud's secession. Schauenburg then received the capitulation signed the day before by Karl Albrecht von Frisching, leader of the pro-French Reform Party, who was appointed head of a new provisional government. Erlach, who intended to continue resistance after retreating from Grauholz, was murdered near Wichtrach by his own soldiers who mistook him for a traitor. A Bernese victory at Neuenegg on 5 March, which stopped a French advance from the south through Murten and Freiburg, had no effect in the outcome of the war. Bern suffered 700 killed in the fighting, while French losses are unknown.

The surrender of Bern led to even more dependencies across Switzerland declaring themselves independent republics. However, the Directory desired a single central republican state at France's eastern border, not dozens of small ones, and steered towards (re)establishment of national unity, though this time with equality for all its subdivisions. A new Constitution had already been written in Paris by Peter Ochs and approved by the Directory. Many Swiss rebels detested it, and the National Convention in Basel passed a modified version, which was then adopted by many other entities, but the French government insisted on the original. A proposal by Brune on 16 and 19 March to divide Switzerland into three republics (Tellgovie, Hélvetie and Rhodanie) was also overruled.

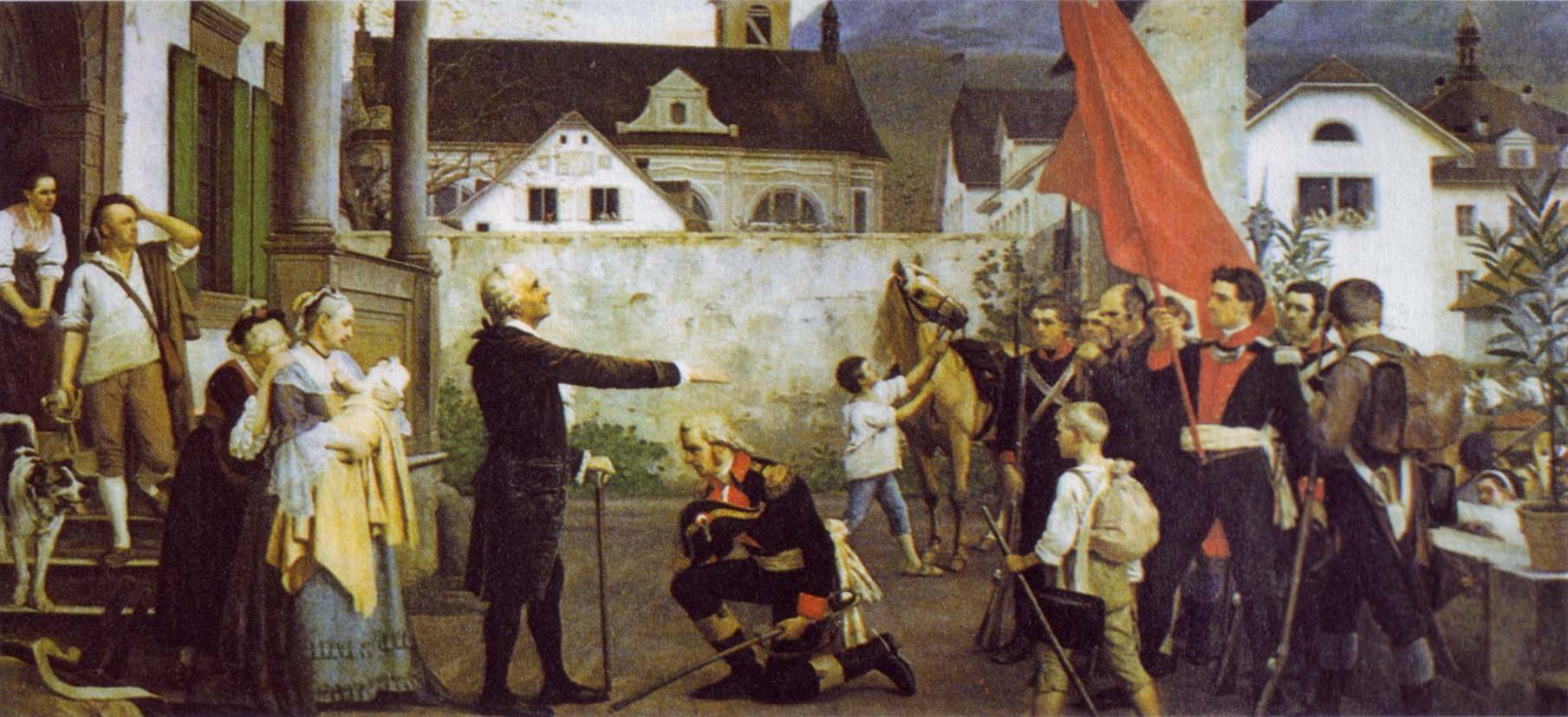
Alois von Reding receives his father's blessing before he marches against the French, by August Weckesser

On 12 April 1798, 121 cantonal deputies proclaimed the Helvetic Republic, a client state of Revolutionary France. The new regime abolished cantonal sovereignty and feudalism, establishing a unitary state based on the ideas of the French Revolution. Subsequently, the cantons of Schwyz, Nidwalden and Uri in Central Switzerland rejected the Helvetic constitution. They were able to gather around 10,000 soldiers, under the command of Alois von Reding, Landeshauptmann of Schwyz. Their forces dispersed on a long line of defense going from the Napf to Rapperswil. Reding took control of Lucerne and advanced across the Brünig Pass into the Bernese Oberland, but Schauenburg launched a counterattack towards Schwyz from occupied Zürich, moving through Zug, Lucerne and the Sattel Pass. Zug and Lucerne surrendered, and were soon followed by Glarus after the capture of Rapperswil and battles near Wollerau. Reding's troops had to retreat after a defeat at Schindellegi, and although victorious at Rothenthurm they were unable to revert the situation. On 4 May, the Landsgemeinde of Schwyz gave up the fight. Impressed by the resistance of the central Swiss, the French granted them mild terms of surrender and allowed them to keep their arms.

The last event of the French invasion was an initially successful revolt of the Upper Valais, which was suppressed in late May. The Nidwalden uprising, an episode related to the invasion though distinct from it, took place in September 1798 and was quashed by the French under Schauenburg, leaving some 100 killed on both sides, along with 300 civilians massacred.

== Aftermath ==
The invasion strained the recently concluded Treaty of Campo Formio (18 October 1797) that had ended the War of the First Coalition against France. Now, the European monarchies once again feared republican France was expanding its grip on the continent, and had to be opposed and driven back. The French conquest of Switzerland, which had maintained its neutrality ever since the outbreak of the French Revolution, was one of the reasons for the formation of the Second Coalition, and would see an Austro-Russian army conduct the Italian and Swiss expedition of 1799.

== Battles ==
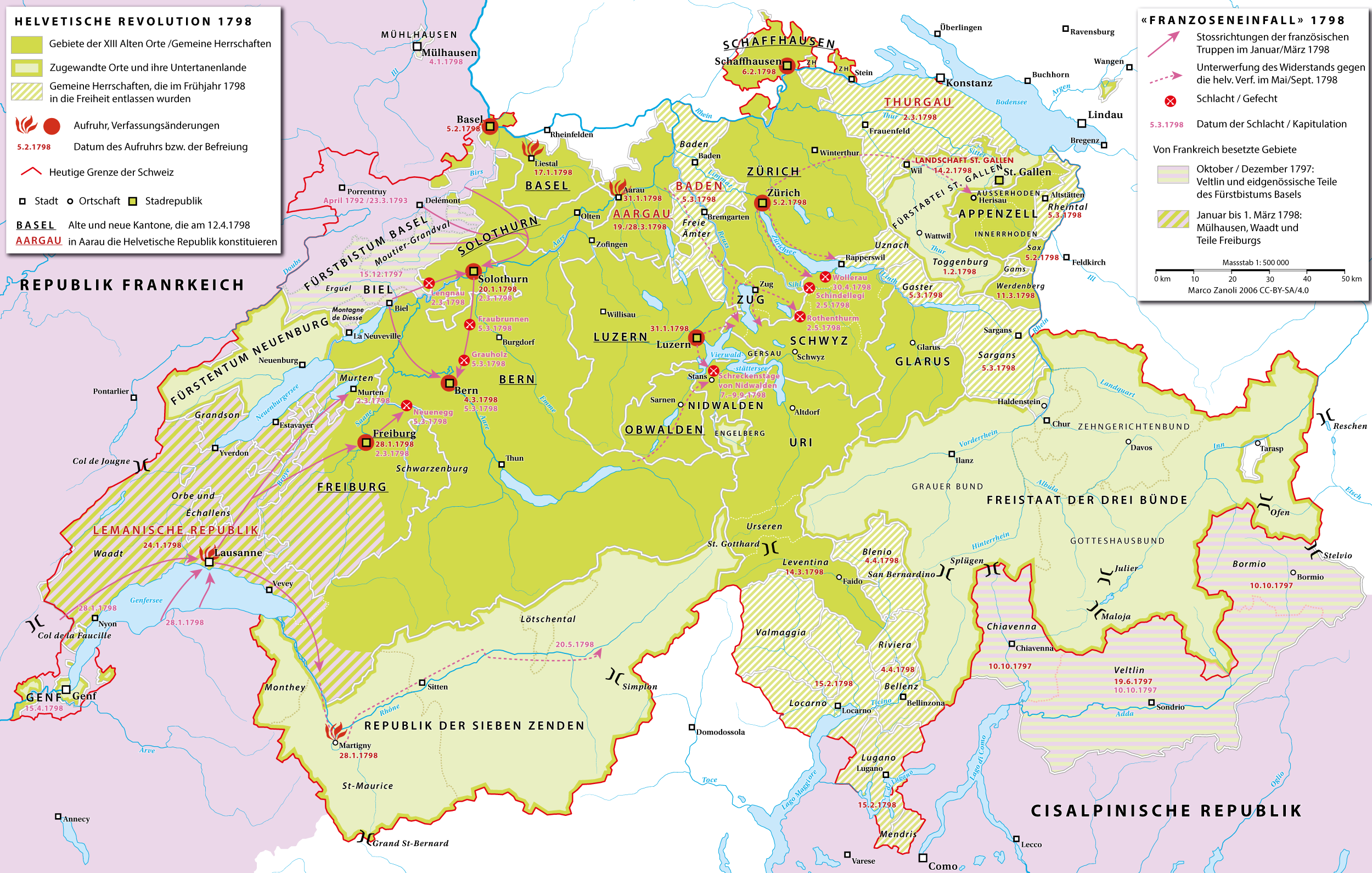
Map of the French invasion of Switzerland and the simultaneous Helvetic Revolution

Date	Battle	Site	Notes
2 March 1798	Battle of Lengnau	Lengnau	France vs. Bern
2 March 1798	Battle of Twann	Twann	France vs. Bern
2 March 1798	Battles of Grenchen and Bellach	Grenchen, Bellach	France defeats Solothurn
3 March 1798	Battle of Col de la Croix	Col de la Croix (Jura)	France vs. Bern
5 March 1798	Battle of Col de la Croix	Col de la Croix (Vaud)	France defeats Bern
5 March 1798	Battle of St. Niklaus	Merzligen	France vs. Bern
5 March 1798	Battle of Fraubrunnen	Fraubrunnen	France defeats Bern
5 March 1798	Battle of Grauholz	Schönbühl	France defeats Bern
5 March 1798	Battle of Neuenegg	Neuenegg	Bern defeats France
26 April 1798	Battle of Hägglingen	Hägglingen	France defeats Zug
30 April 1798	Battle of Wollerau	Wollerau	France defeats Schwyz
1 May 1798	Battle of Stucketen-Chäppeli	Beinwil	France vs. Solothurn
2 May 1798	Battle of Schindellegi	Feusisberg	France defeats Schwyz
2/3 May 1798	Battle of Rothenthurm	Rothenthurm	Schwyz defeats France
17 May 1798	1st Battle of Pfyn	Sion	France defeats Upper Valais
7–9 September 1798	Nidwalden uprising	Nidwalden	France defeats Nidwalden

Preceded by Treaty of Campo Formio	French Revolution: Revolutionary campaigns French invasion of Switzerland	Succeeded by French campaign in Egypt and Syria
