= Valais Republic =

1802–1810 sister republic of France in Romandy

Valais Republic République du Valais (French)
- 1802–1810
- Flag Coat of arms

- Status: Client state of France
- Capital: Sion
- Religion: Roman Catholic Church (state religion)
- Government: Federal directorial republic
- Grand Bailiff
  - 1802-1807: Antoine-Marie Augustini
  - 1807-1810: Leopold de Sepibus
- Council of State
- Legislature: General Diet
- Historical era: Napoleonic Wars
  - Separation from the Helvetic Republic: 28 August 1802
  - Annexation to the French Empire through decree: 13 December 1810
Preceded by	Succeeded by
Helvetic Republic	First French Empire

The Valais Republic (French: République du Valais; German: Republik Wallis; Arpitan: Rèpublica du Valês) or Vallais was a sister republic of France that existed between 1802 and 1810 in the French-speaking part of Switzerland, during the Napoleonic Wars, in territory corresponding to the modern Swiss canton of Valais.

== History ==
A Rhodanic Republic had already been envisaged in March 1798 by General Guillaume Brune, commander of the French troops in Switzerland, as one of three successor republics of the Old Swiss Confederacy (the other two being Tellgovie and the Helvetic). Brune's République rhodanique would have incorporated the present-day cantons of Vaud, Valais, Ticino, Fribourg and part of Bern (Oberland) with Lausanne as its capital. The canton was to be divided into 17 administrative districts, each with a sous-prefet. However, this idea was put aside. In 1798, when the troops of the French Republic invaded the Swiss Confederacy, the French-speaking population of the Lower Valais declared a Revolutionary République du Valais (March 16) which was swiftly incorporated (May 1) into the Helvetic Republic.

The Helvetic Republic served Napoleon's purposes well for some time, until it became ridden with internal strife and disputes and became unstable. At the same time, as First Consul Napoleon had felt the need to better secure the strategic Simplon Pass in Valais since the Battle of Marengo in 1800, as a passage from France to Italy, considering the difficulty of crossing the Alps through the Great St Bernard Pass, also in Valais. Though unwilingly, the Helvetic authorities accepted the separation of Valais which was accomplished on 28 August 1802 (10 Fructidor, Year X), in a treaty signed in Sion and Bex by France, the Italian Republic, the Helvetic Republic and the now independent Republic of Valais. The treaty's third article confirmed French defense and control over the Simplon Pass.

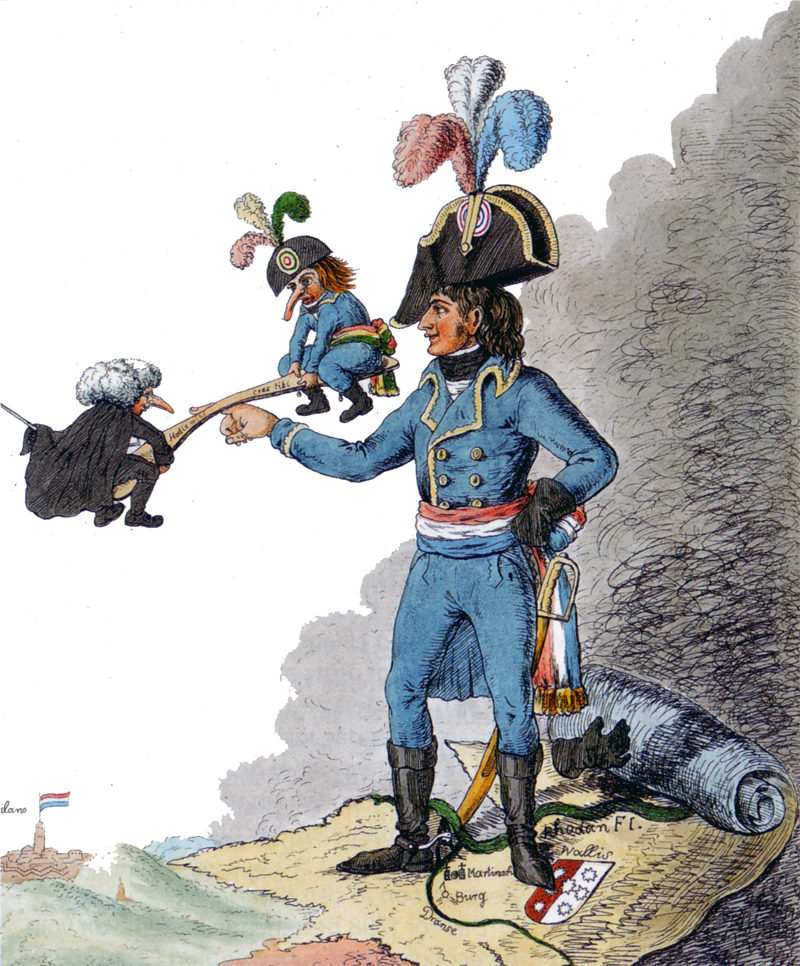
Political caricature of Napoleon controlling Valais while "balancing" the conservative and revolutionary factions with a seesaw. The coat of arms of Valais is erroneously shown with the seven stars of the ancien régime's Republic of the Seven Tithings, instead of the twelve stars of the Republic of Valais

Napoleon quickly ordered the development of a route which would connect Paris with Milan, capital of the Italian Republic, but works were undertaken slowly. In 1806, the road was officially opened despite not being complete yet. François-René de Chateaubriand was appointed French minister to the Valais in November 1803, but as a royalist resigned in March 1804 following the execution of the Duke of Enghien by French authorities. He was replaced by Joseph Eschassériaux, who held the post from July 1804 to October 1806, the year he wrote a Lettre sur le Valais et sur les moeurs de ses habitants ("Letter on the Valais and on the manners of its inhabitants").

=== Annexation by France ===
By an imperial decree of 12 November 1810, Napoleon annexed to the French Empire the territory of the Republic of Valais, as a department under the name of Simplon. In the decree, he justified the annexation:

Considering that the Simplon Road, which unites the Empire to our Kingdom of Italy, is useful to more than sixty million men; that it cost our treasures in France and Italy more than eighteen million, an expense which would become useless if commerce could find there no convenience and perfect security;

That the Valais did not fulfill any of the engagements it had contracted when we had the work begun to open this great communication;

Wanting moreover to put an end to the anarchy which afflicts this country, and to cut short the abusive pretensions of sovereignty of a part of the population on the other.

With the collapse of the Empire during the War of the Sixth Coalition, the department was occupied by Austrian troops in late December 1813. In August 1815, the Valais entered the new Swiss Confederation as a canton.

== Military ==
On October 4, 1805 the French and Valais signed a decree, a capitulation for the small republic to provide 661 men in the "Valais battalion". Recruitment was difficult as regulations prevented Valais from having a fully operational battalion, and even a year later on October 1, 1806 they were still 471 men short. The regulations were stringent: all men had to be at least 5 ft 2 in (1.57 m) tall (just 2 inches below average height), had to volunteer, had to be aged 18-40, and had to serve for at least 4 years.

== Gallery ==
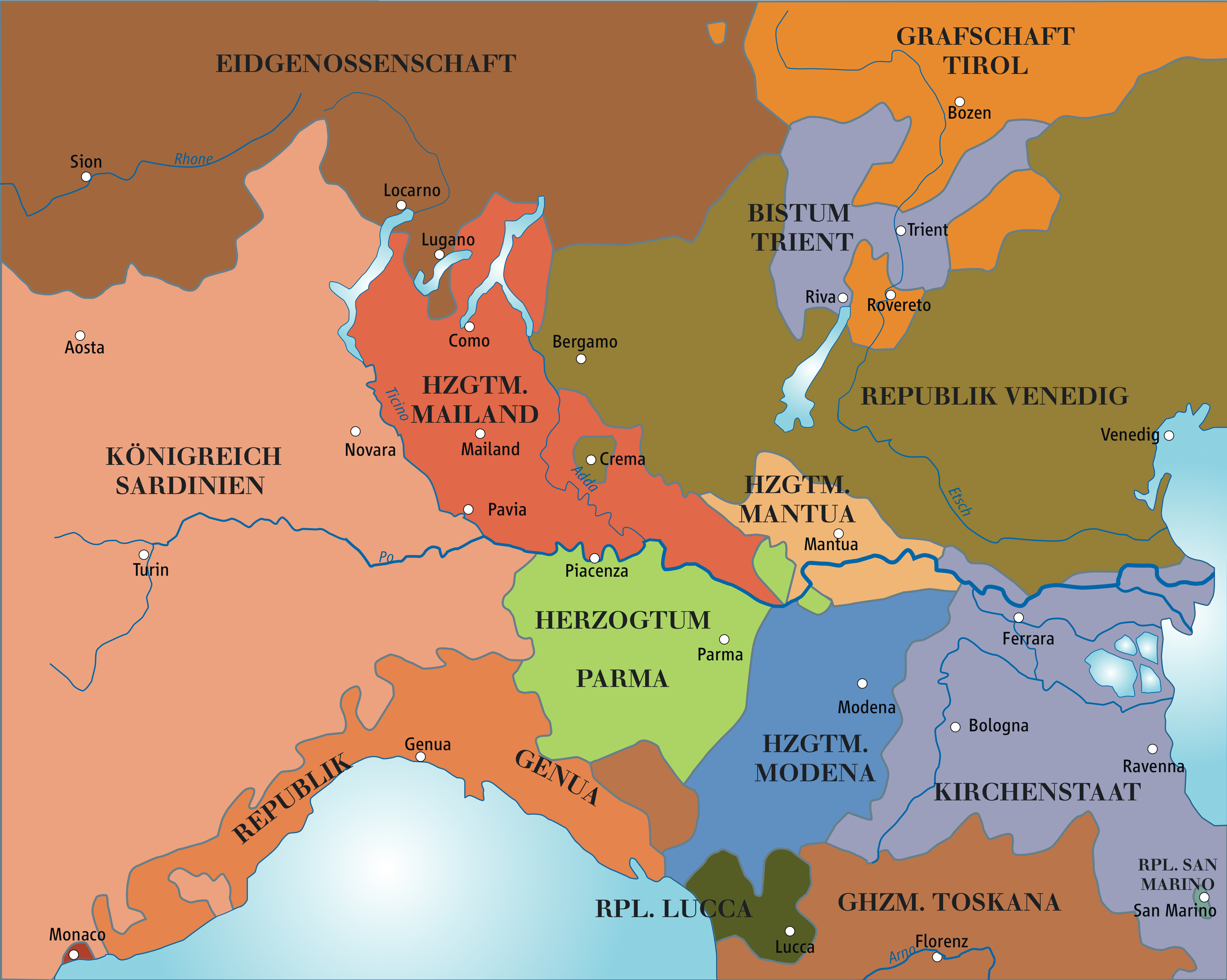
Northern Italy before
the French invasion of 1796
