= Battle of Grauholz =

Battle of the French invasion of Switzerland

- Part of the French invasion of Switzerland
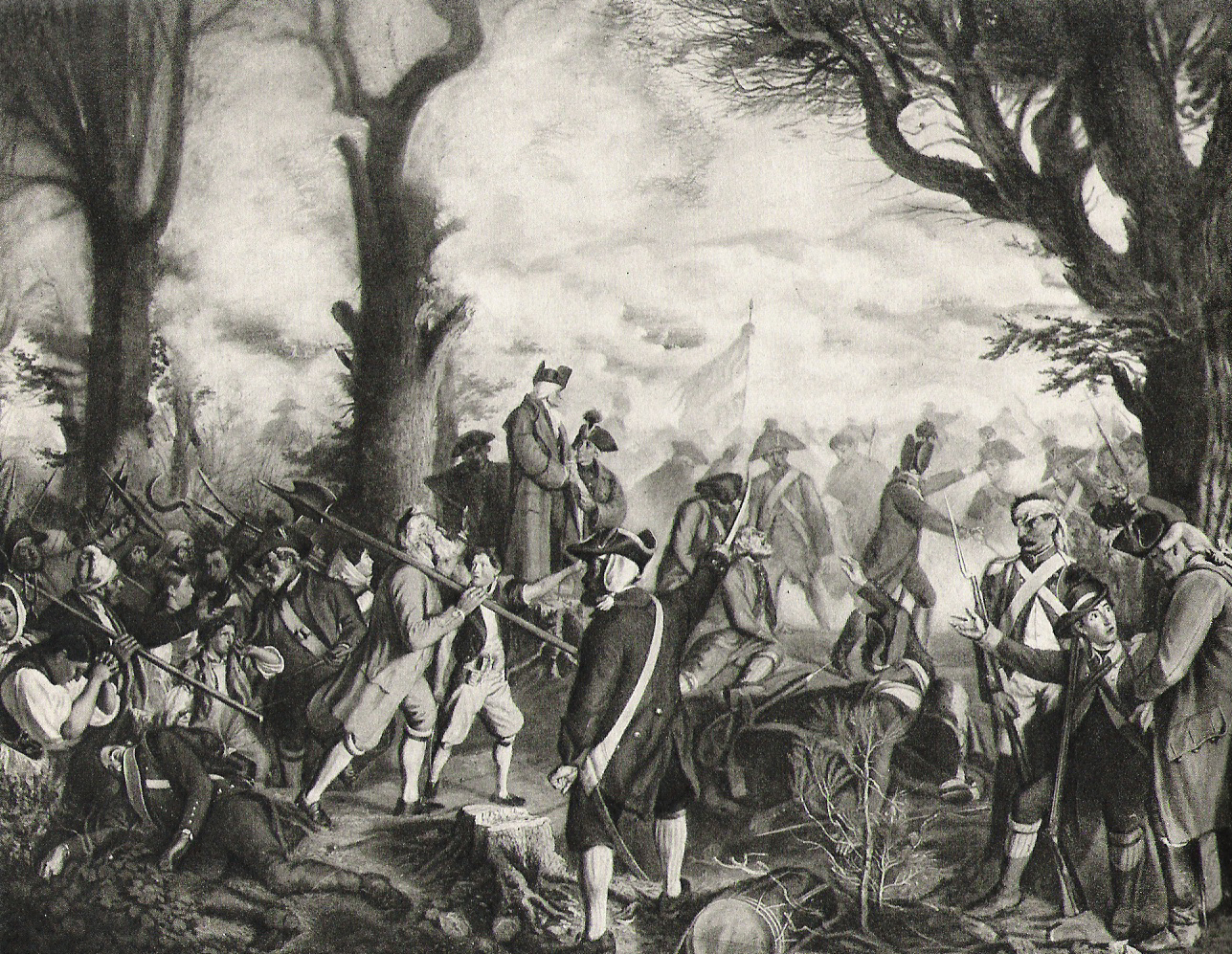
- Engraving of a painting of the battle
| Date | 5 March 1798 |
| Location | Urtenen-Schönbühl, Moosseedorf 47°1′N 7°30′E |
| Result | French victory |

Belligerents
| France | Canton of Bern |

Commanders and leaders
| Balthazar Alexis Henri Schauenburg | Karl Ludwig von Erlach |

Strength
| 18,000 | 30,000 |

Casualties and losses
| 1,600 killed or wounded | 2,000 killed or wounded |

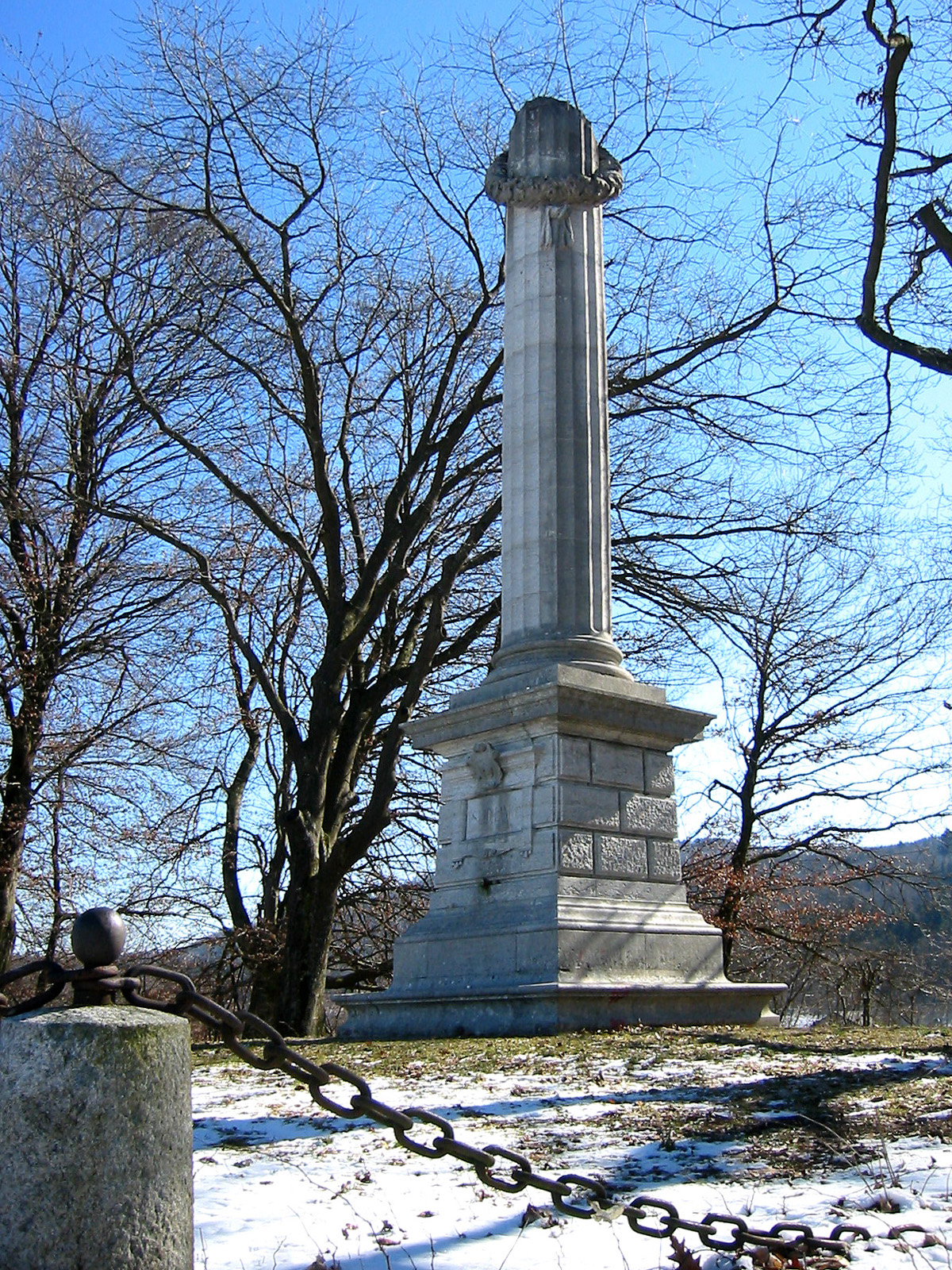
Grauholz memorial in Moosseedorf

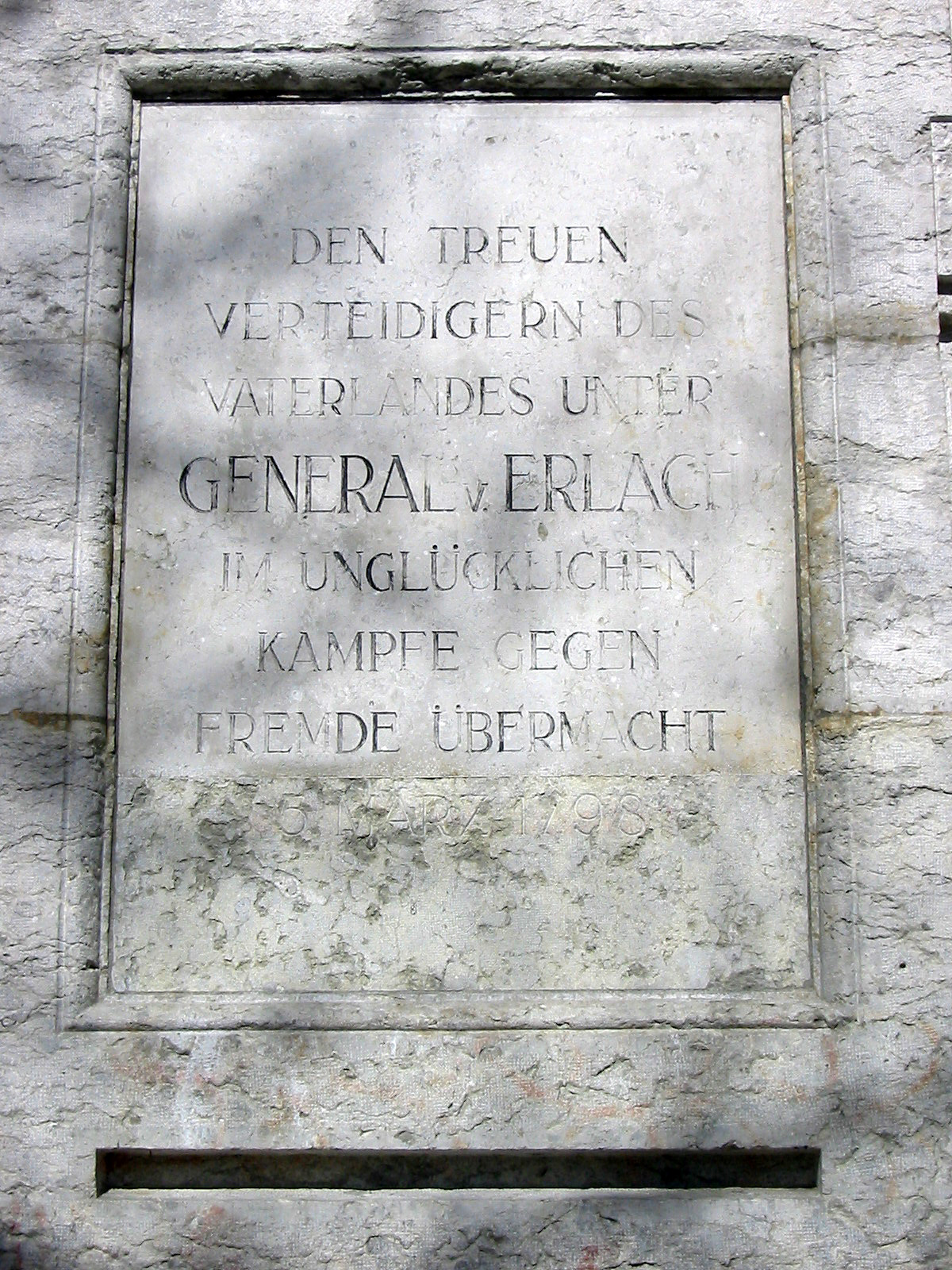
Tablet on the Grauholz memorial

The Battle of Grauholz on 5 March 1798 was a battle between a Bernese army under Karl Ludwig von Erlach against the French Revolutionary Army under Balthazar Alexis Henri Schauenburg. The battle took place at Grauholz, a wooded hill in what is now the municipalities of Urtenen-Schönbühl and Moosseedorf in the canton of Bern in Switzerland. The government of Bern had already surrendered the previous day, and the Bernese defeat at Grauholz ended their resistance to the French in the north of the canton.

== Background ==
Attempting to gain control of key alpine passes and establish a buffer against the hostile monarchies of Europe, France first invaded some of the associates of the Swiss Confederation. Part of the bishopric of Basel was absorbed into France in 1793. In 1797, Napoleon annexed the Valtellina on the border with Graubünden into the new Cisalpine Republic in northern Italy and invaded the southern remainder of the bishopric of Basel.

In 1798, the confederacy was invaded by the French Revolutionary Army at the invitation of the Republican faction in Vaud, led by Frédéric-César de La Harpe. Vaud was under Bernese control but chafed under a government that often spoke a different language and came from a different culture. The ideals of the French Revolution had found a receptive audience in Vaud. So when Vaud revolted and declared a republic, the French had a pretext to invade the entire Confederation. The French army entered the Lemanic Republic on 24 January 1798, and Bernese troops retreated peacefully to Murten and Fribourg. French General Balthazar Alexis Henri Schauenburg deployed troops in two wings and prepared to attack from the north and south. Bern raised about 20,000 troops, while the rest of the Confederation provided 4,100 support troops. The two wings of the French army had about 35,000 troops.

Bern's refusal to accept a government led by the French-supported Reform or Peace Party provided a pretext for an invasion. On 1 March 1798, French troops invaded Bern and the Canton of Solothurn. On the following day, the Battles of Lengnau, Twann and Grenchen and Bellach ended in French victories and the capitulation of Solothurn. On 4 March 1798, the government of Bern surrendered to the French, but the Bernese troops prepared to fight the invaders.

== Battle ==
The Bernese army of about 6,400 men first met a French army of about 18,000 men at the Battle of Fraubrunnen but were driven back to Grauholz, a wooded hill near Bern. By this time, General Erlach only had about two battalions of soldiers. Many women, older men, and sometimes even children of the rural population joined the fighting Bernese troops and tried to protect their city from the French invasion. An eyewitness describes many residents of the nearby village of Bolligen joining the Bernese army.

The Bernese army held out for about two and a half hours against the larger French army before it finally broke. Most of the Bernese army left the woods in small groups or individually. Of the farmers from Bollingen village, 27 men died in the battle. One report from 1804 stated that the Swiss had 2,000 casualties while the French suffered about 1,600 killed and more wounded. A later estimate was that Bern lost a total of about 700 men in the battles between 2–5 March 1798, but French losses in the campaign are unknown.

== Aftermath ==
While General Johann Rudolf von Graffenried had won a victory against the French southern wing at Neuenegg on the same day, the government's surrender and the defeat at Grauholz ended Bernese resistance.

General Karl Ludwig von Erlach retreated with a portion of his army. He attempted to hold the Schosshalde and Felsenburg, the entrance to the Untertorbrücke and the city of Bern, but was unsuccessful. He then travelled south, preparing to move into the Bernese Oberland and organise a resistance. However, at Wichtrach, he was attacked by either Bernese soldiers or farmers, who believed him to be a traitor and murdered him.

== See also ==
- Battles of the Old Swiss Confederacy
- Campaigns of 1798 in the French Revolutionary Wars
