= Tellgovie =

Proposed Swiss republic

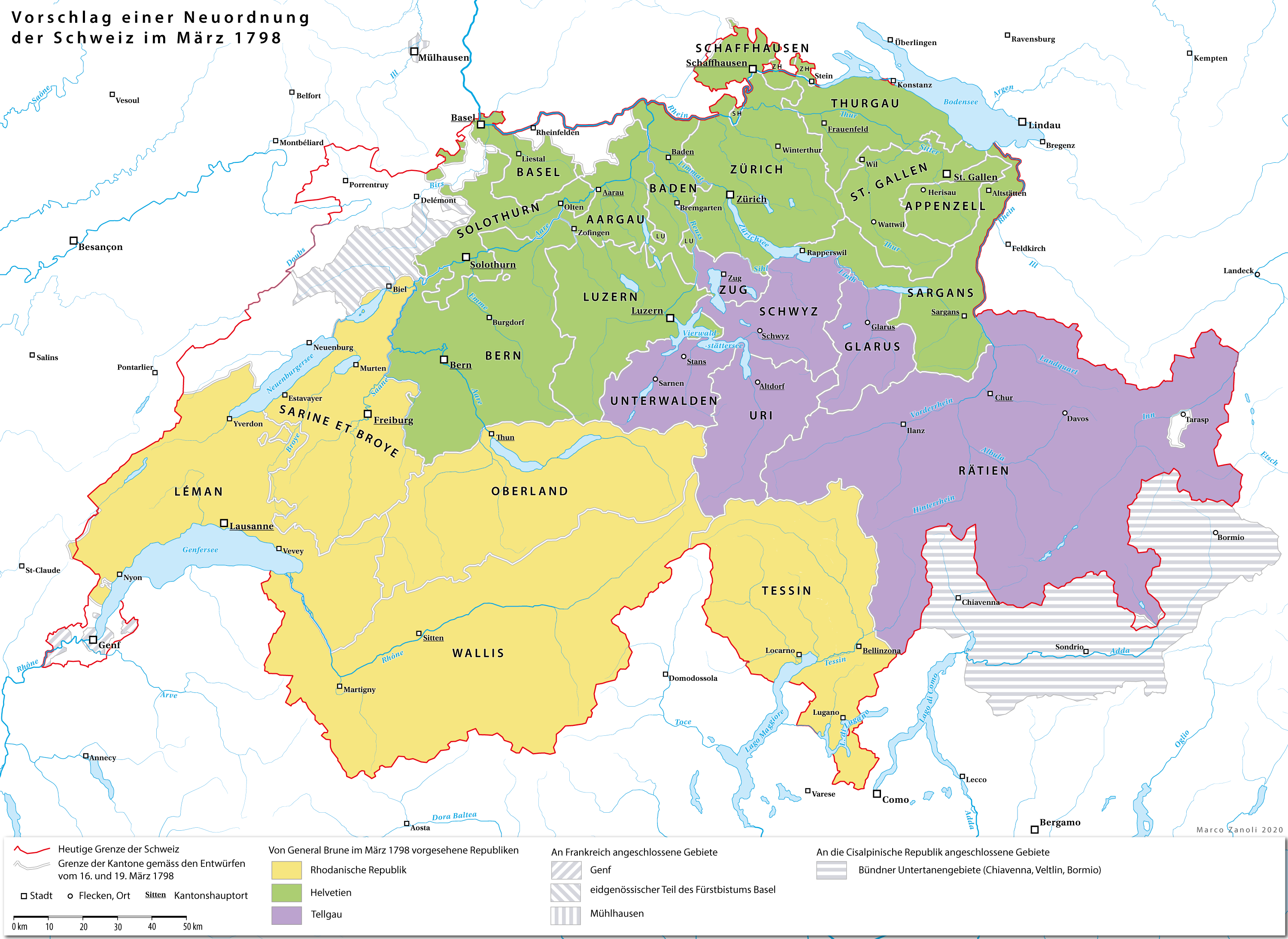
Map of the partition of Switzerland into three republics. Tellgovie is purple.

Tellgovie (in German Tellgau, ("the land of William Tell") is the name of one of the three Swiss republics imagined in 1798. It was supposed to bring together the Canton of Waldstätten and the Three Leagues.

On 16 March 1798, eleven days after occupying Bern, General Brune proclaimed the partition of Switzerland into three states:

- Rhodanic Republic or Rhodania, a unitary republic comprising Vaud, Valais, Ticino and Fribourg, with Lausanne as its capital;
- the Swiss Republic or Helvetia, a unitary republic with the capital at Aarau;
- the Tellian Republic or Tellgovie, a federal republic comprising the small cantons of central Switzerland and the Grisons, with Schwyz as its capital.

This decision caused an outcry and was revoked on 22 March. On 12 April, the birth of the unitary Helvetic Republic was proclaimed.
