= Balthazar Alexis Henri Schauenburg =

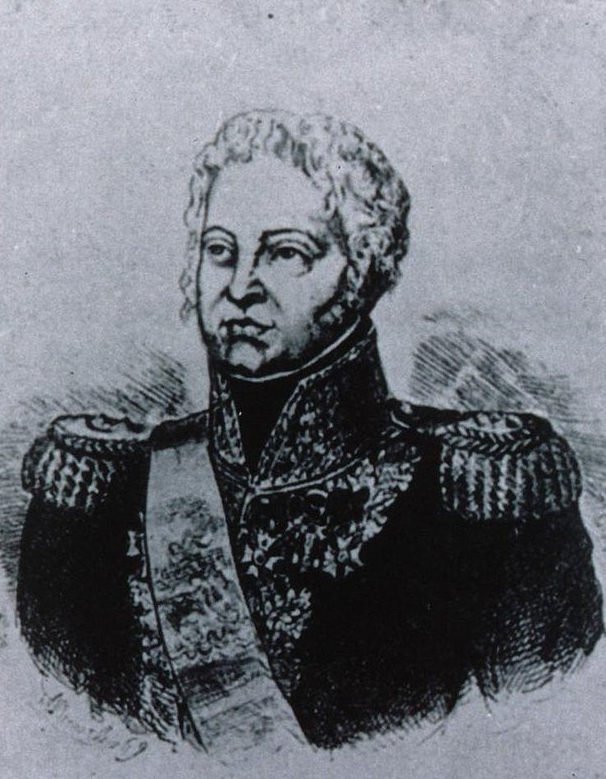
- Born: 31 July 1748; Hellimer
- Died: 1 September 1831 (aged 83); Geudertheim
- Military career
- Allegiance: France; French Republic
- Branch: French Army
- Service years: 1764–1814
- Rank: Général de division
- Conflicts: War of the First Coalition; Battle of Valmy; Raid on Kehl; French invasion of Switzerland; Battle of Grauholz; War of the Second Coalition; Battle of Stockach; Battle of Messkirch
- Awards: Name engraved on Arc de Triomphe

Balthazar Alexis Henri Schauenburg (also spelled Schauenbourg), (born in Hellimer on 31 July 1748 and died in Geudertheim on 1 September 1831) was a French general who served in the wars of the French Revolution and the Empire. He briefly commanded the Army of the Moselle in 1793 during the War of the First Coalition. A nobleman, he joined the French Royal Army as a sous-lieutenant in 1764. The French Revolution led to rapid promotion and then to arrest for the crime of being an aristocrat. Later restored to command, he commanded Kehl in 1796 and invaded Switzerland in 1798. He served in Jean Victor Marie Moreau's army in 1800 and held commands in the interior under the First French Empire. He retired from the army in 1814 and died in 1831. Schawembourg is one of the names inscribed under the Arc de Triomphe, on Column 23.

== Family ==
The family of Schauenburg dates to the eleventh century, and the union of Utha, daughter of Godfrey count of Calw, with Luitgarde of the house of Zähringen and Henry the Great, duke of Bavaria.

By the late fourteenth century, the line of Winterbach had formed; within two more generations, the lines of Luxembourg and Alsace. The Alsatian line, founded with Rene (Renaud) in 1474, is linked with the house of Austria and the margraves of Baden, dating to the late fifteenth century; he was invested with several fiefs and made an alliance with the knights of Ortenau. During a campaign with the brothers of the margraves of Baden, he served well as their champion of battle, and was rewarded with a chateau at Isenheim. His advantageous marriages to Agathe of Stauffenberg and (second) Claire de Oersperg, and the survival of his second child Nicholas, sealed his success. Nicholas not only became the grand master of the forests of Baden, he lived to the fantastic age of 91 (when he married a second time), and produced equally energetic and successful children. After three more generations, this line of the family divided into three branches: Nicholas III, founded the branch of Oberkirch and Gaisbach; Jean-Rene founded the branches of Herrlisheim and Moravia; Christophe founded the Alsatian branches of Jungholz and Fribourg.

Balthazar Alexis Henri descended of the Schauenburg branch called the Jungholz. Schauenburg was the first son (and oldest child) of Bathazar Schauenburg (1718–1788). Balthazar (senior) was captain in the Regiment of Nassau, and chevalier of the Order of Saint Louis; he married on 2 August 1745 to Marie Charlotte of Gaillard (1725–1808), daughter of Claude Gaillard (1685–1779), the Count of Hellimer. Balthazar senior and his wife had two other children: Jean-Pierre, born 16 June 1753, was a captain of the regiment Alsace, and served the Prince Deux Pont in Munich as his chamberlain. The third child, Francois Andre Balthazar, born on 1 December 1761, was a colonel of battalion, chevalier of Saint Louis, and died 15 June 1833.

Balthazar Alexis Henri Schauenburg married Marie-Francoise-Sophie-Louise Albertine d' Tratzheim in 1783, and they had the four children. The first, Maximilian-Joseph (30 April 1784–19 September 1838), was Marechal de camp (brigadier general), Commander of the Legion of honor, and married (first) to Caroline de Berkheim (died 1827, sister of General Sigismond Frédéric de Berckheim) and (second) Hortense de Lerme. The second child, François-Joseph, born 1785, was a captain of grenadiers and died in 1807 at the Battle of Heilsberg. The third child, Pierre-Rielle, was born 18 March 1793 in Saarlouis; he became a second lieutenant in 1808, chief of squadron and deputy and peer of France, member of the General Council, which was elected by universal suffrage. As Baron of Schauenburg, he married Adele, daughter of Jean-Nicolas du Bosque and Salome de Marechal, and had three children: Pierre-Joseph-Balthazar-Alexis, 21 June 1828, who became a magistrate; Idlesomme-Odon-Henri, born 2 January 1830, captain of the 2nd Dragoons and Chevalier of the Legion of Honor and Marie Josephine-Isaure, born 29 March 1831. Their fourth child, Jean-Charles, was born 20 January 1797, became a cavalry officer, and died in 1826.

== Military career ==
During his lifelong military career, he served first in Louis XV's royal army as a 14-year-old cadet in an Alsatian regiment; upon his promotion to second lieutenant, he transferred to a Nassau regiment. From 1770 to 1772, he served in the Corsican campaign. After the French Revolution, he adopted the principles of equality, and his career advanced quickly. Replacing Louis-Alexandre Berthier, he served as chief of staff to François Christophe de Kellermann at the Battle of Valmy in September 1792. He turned out to be a talented organizer. On 5 August 1793 he was appointed to lead the Army of the Moselle against his wishes. He claimed to be a good military instructor but not an army commander. The generals had already seen many commanders-in-chief disgraced or executed, so few men wanted the assignment. Yet during his appointment to the Army of the Moselle, he drilled raw recruits into a functioning military unit. As a nobleman, Schauenburg came under suspicion and Jean René Moreaux was named to replace him on 24 September 1793. However, Moreaux was ill from an old wound and Jacques Charles René Delauney took over as acting commander on 30 September. Delauney held the post until Lazare Hoche became the Army of Moselle's new leader on 31 October 1793. Schauenburg was imprisoned during the Reign of Terror until 27 July 1794. (Note: There is some confusion over when he was released: 27 July 1794, according to the Thacher collection notes, or 7 August 1794, according to the notes in Correspondence of general Carnot.)

Schauenburg was appointed to the rank of inspector general of the infantry to the Army of the Rhine and Moselle and served during the Rhine Campaign of 1796. and commanded one of the armies responsible for the invasion of the Swiss Confederation in January 1798; under his guidance, the French suppressed the Swiss anti-French uprising, which had resulted in a civil war. He exacted heavy war contributions from the Swiss, in particular on the city of Bern. He also led the troops which captured the abbey of Mariastein He commanded the Army of Helvetia from 8 March to 10 December 1798, when he was replaced by General André Masséna. Subsequently, he transferred to the Army of the Rhine, where he served from 1799 to 1801.

Schauenburg was appointed Inspector General of Infantry in 1806 under Napoleon I. In 1814, as military commander of Tours, he rallied to Louis XVIII. The King awarded Schauenburg by appointing him a Commandant of Order of Saint Louis, and Grand Officer of the Legion of Honor. He retired on 24 December 1814. He went blind in his old age, and died in the castle he built in Geudertheim on 1 September 1831. Schawembourg is one of the names inscribed under the Arc de Triomphe, on Column 23.

== Promotions, commands, and honors ==
=== Promotions ===
Schauenburg received the following promotions:

- second lieutenant 1 May 1764
- first lieutenant 1 August 1767
- captain 25 May 1781
- major (regiment of Nassau infantry) 25 March 1785
- lieutenant colonel 1 January 1791
- colonel 23 September 1791
- Provisionally, brigadier (also called marechal de camp) 23 November 1791, confirmed 7 September 1792
- lieutenant general 8 March 1793
- Inspector General of Infantry, 23 September 1806
- Retired 24 December 1814

=== Commands ===
- Commander in chief, Army of the Moselle 3 August 1793–24 September 1793
- Inspector general of infantry, Army of the Rhine and Moselle, 18 July 1795–24 September 1798
- Commander, Army of Helvetia 8 March 1798–29 November 1799

=== Honors ===
- Chevalier, Order of Saint Louis 1 March 1786
- Member, Legion of Honor, 11 December 1803; Commander, Legion of Honor 14 June 1804
- Baron of Empire 16 December 1810
- Grand Officer of the Legion of Honor 29 July 1814
- Commander of the Order of Saint Louis, 23 August 1814.

== Publications ==
- La tactique et la discipline dans les armées de la révolution. by Schauenbourg, Balthazar baron

== References, citations, and notes ==
=== Citations ===
- Broughton, Tony. "Generals Who Served in the French Army during the Period: 1789–1814, Scalfort to Serviez". The Napoleon Series.
- Nafziger, George. "French Army in Germany, 10 May 1800" (PDF). US Army Combined Arms Center.
- Smith, Digby (1998). The Napoleonic Wars Data Book. London: Greenhill. ISBN 1-85367-276-9.
