= Simplon (department) =

Former French department (1810–1815)

Department of Simplon Département du Simplon (French)
- 1810–1813
- Location of Simplon in France (1812)
- Status: Department of the French First Empire
- Chef-lieu: Sion; 46°11′N 7°41′E
- Common languages: French; German
- Historical era: Napoleonic Wars
  - Annexation of the Republic of Valais: 13 December 1810
  - Occupied by Austrian forces: 29 December 1813

Area
  - 1812: 5,000 km^{2} (1,900 sq mi)

Population
  - 1812 census: 65500
Preceded by	Succeeded by
Republic of Valais	Restoration and Regeneration in Switzerland
- Today part of: Switzerland

Simplon (French: [sɛ̃.plɔ̃]) was a department of the First French Empire. It was named after the Simplon Pass (Italian: Passo del Sempione). It was formed in 1810, when the Republic of Valais was annexed by France. Its territory corresponded with that of the present-day Swiss canton of Valais.

The chef-lieu of the department was Sion. The department was subdivided into the following three arrondissements and cantons:

- Sion: Hérémence, Loèche, Sierre and Sion.
- Brigue: Brigue, Conches, Mœrel, Rarogne and Viège.
- Saint-Maurice: Entremont, Martigny, Monthey and Saint-Maurice.

After the final defeat of Napoleon Bonaparte in 1815, the department was admitted to the Swiss Confederation and became the canton of Valais.

== Creation ==
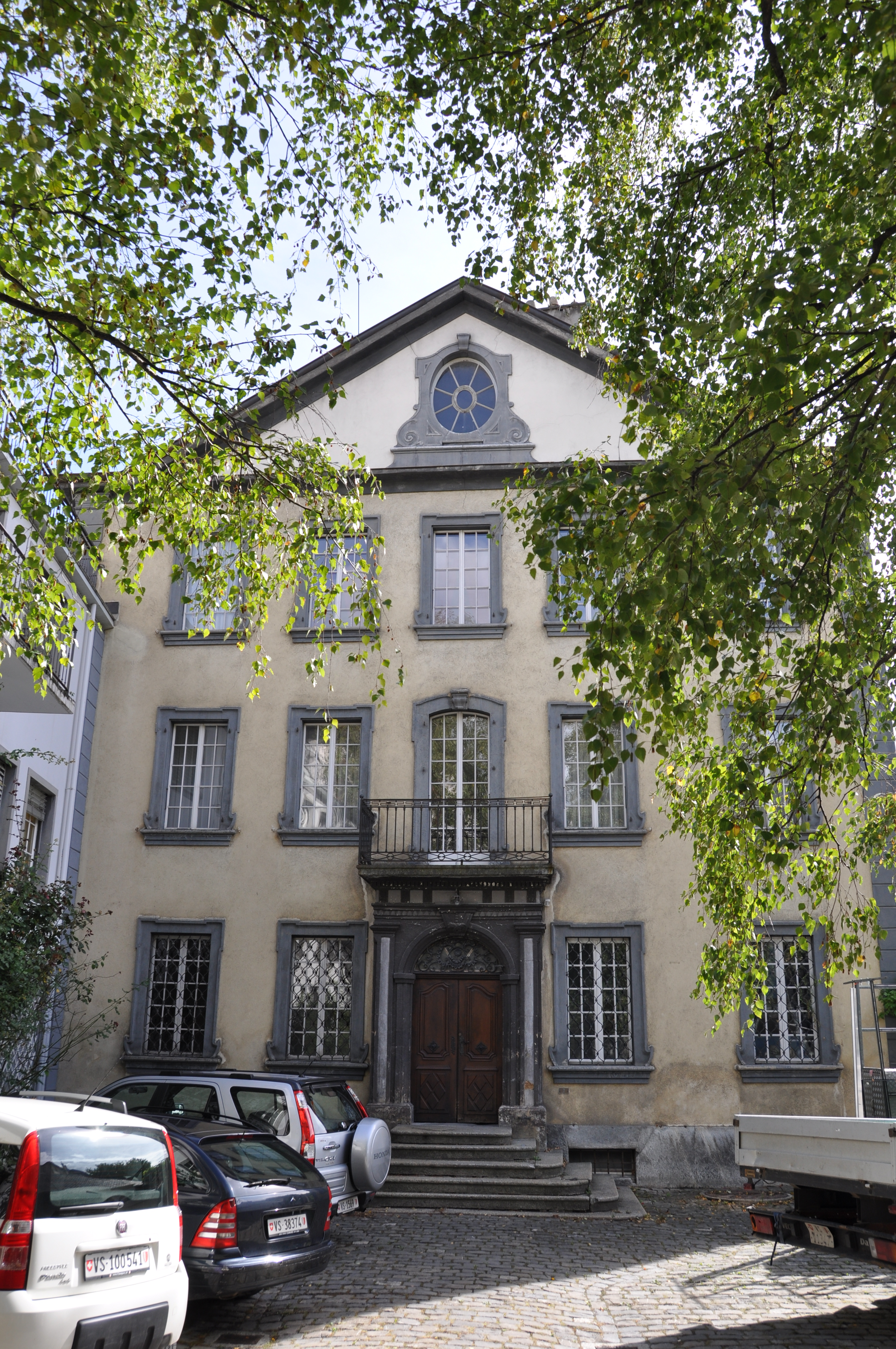
Maison de Kalbermatten, former prefecture of the department

The department was created by Article 2 of the decree of 12 November 1810, reuniting the Valais to the French Empire. This decree is written as follows:

NAPOLEON, EMPEROR OF THE FRENCH, KING OF ITALY, PROTECTOR OF THE CONFEDERATION OF THE RHINE, MEDIATOR OF THE SWISS CONFEDERATION:
Considering that the Simplon Road, which unites the Empire to our Kingdom of Italy, is useful to more than sixty million men; that it cost our treasures in France and Italy more than eighteen million, an expense which would become useless if commerce could find there no convenience and perfect security;
That the Valais did not fulfill any of the engagements it had contracted when we had the work begun to open this great communication;
Wanting moreover to put an end to the anarchy which afflicts this country, and to cut short the abusive pretensions of sovereignty of a part of the population on the other,
We have decreed and ordered, decree and order the following:
FIRST ARTICLE. - The Valais is reunited to the Empire.
ART. 2. - This territory will form a department under the name of Department of Simplon.
ART. 3. - This department will be part of the seventh military division.
ART. 4. - It will be taken possession, without delay, on our behalf, and a general commissioner will be in charge of administering it throughout the rest of this year.
ART. 5. - All our ministers will be charged with the execution of this decree.
Signed: Napoleon
By the Emperor: The Minister Secretary of State,
Signed: Hugues-Bernard Maret, Duke of Bassano

This decree was confirmed by the organic senatus-consulte of 13 December 1810. This senatus-consulte is written as follows:

FIRST ARTICLE. - The Valais is reunited to the territory of the French Empire.
ART. 2. - It will form a department under the name of Department of Simplon.
ART. 3. - The department of Simplon will have a deputy in the Legislative Body. - This deputy will be appointed in 1811: he will be renewed in the year of the fourth series, to which the Department of Simplon will belong.
ART. 4. - The Department of Simplon will be the jurisdiction of the imperial court of Lyon.

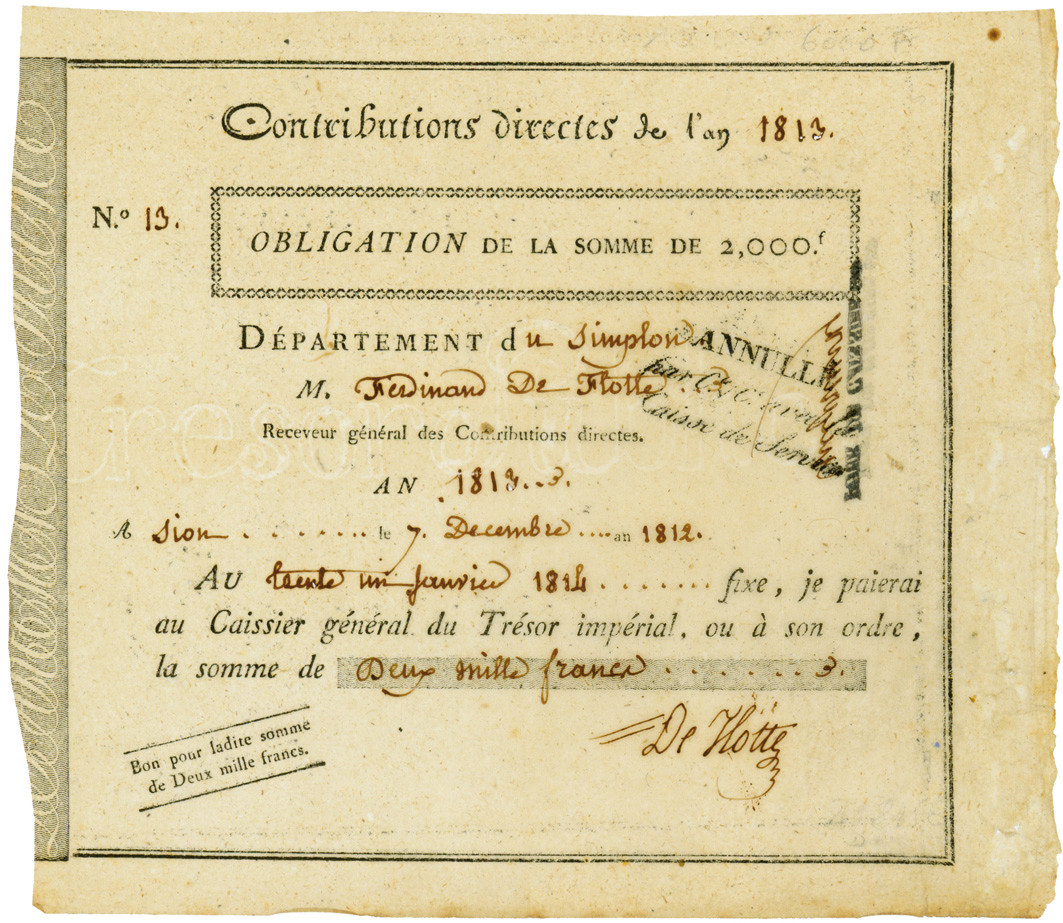
Bond of the Département du Simplon, issued 7. December 1812; probably the oldest bond from Switzerland

== Administration ==
=== Prefects ===
The prefect (préfet) was the highest state representative in the department. The holder of the office was also subprefect of Sion.

Term start	Term end	Office holder
11 January 1811	13 November 1811	Claude Joseph Parfait Derville-Maléchard
13 November 1811	29 December 1813	Claude-Philibert Barthelot de Rambuteau

=== Secretary-general ===
The secretary-general was the deputy to the prefect.

Term start	Term end	Office holder
11 January 1811	29 December 1813	Joseph Rouiller

=== Subprefect of Brigue ===
Term start	Term end	Office holder
8 February 1811	29 December 1813	Léopold de Sepibus

=== Subprefect of Saint-Maurice ===
Term start	Term end	Office holder
8 February 1811	29 December 1813	Michel Dufour

=== Other officials ===
The Simplon was represented in the Empire's Corps Legislatif by Charles Emmanuel de Rivaz, a cousin of Isaac de Rivaz. The commander of the troops stationed in the department was Étienne Félix d'Henin de Cuvillers.

== See also ==
- Valais History
