= Majorie Castle =

Castle in Sion, Switzerland

- Château de la Majorie (French)
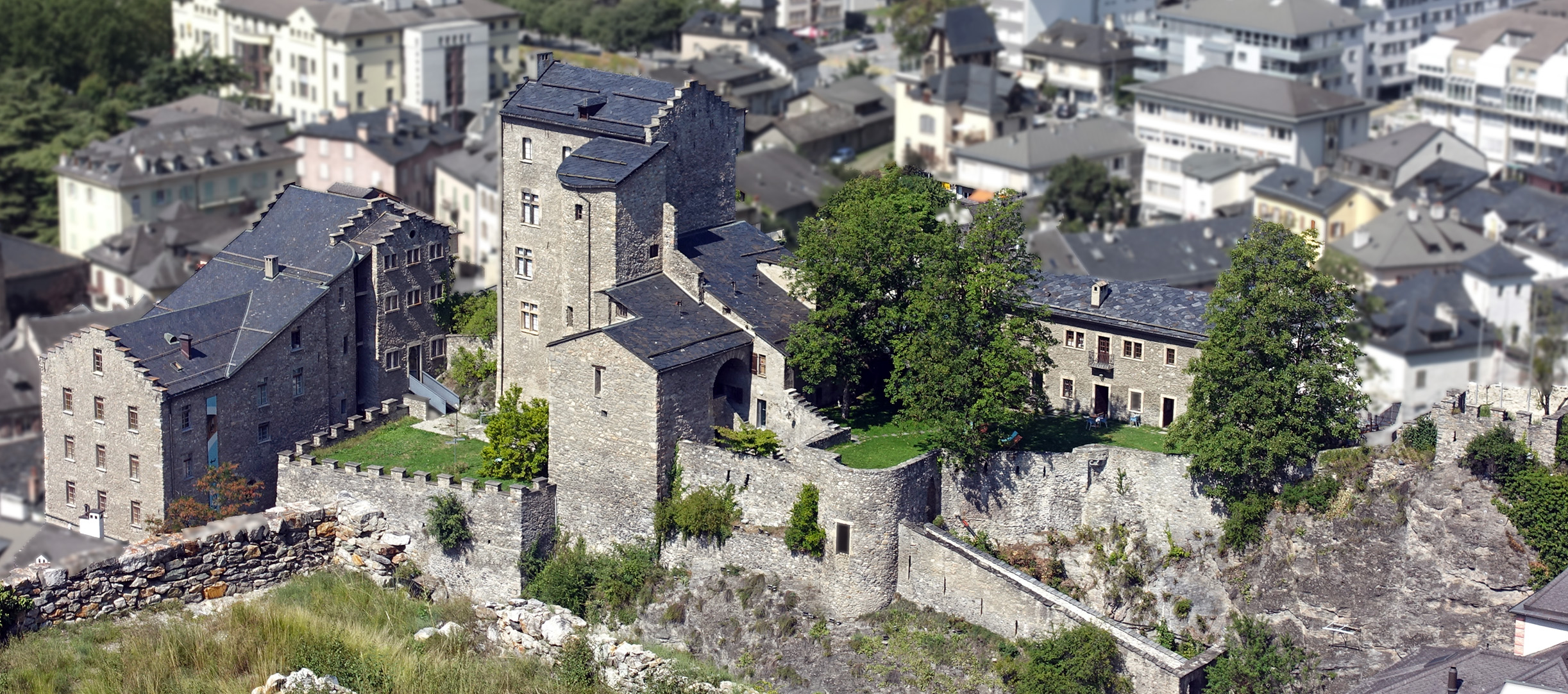
- The Majorie episcopal complex, with the Vidomnat on the left and the Majorie tower in the center

- Location within Switzerland
- 46°14′04″N 7°21′43″E
- Location: Sion, Switzerland

History
- Built: 12th century

Site notes
- Current use: Valais Museum of Fine Arts
- Owner: Canton of Valais

Swiss Cultural Property of National Significance

Majorie Castle is a castle in the municipality of Sion in the Canton of Valais, Switzerland. It is a Swiss heritage site of national significance.

== Description ==
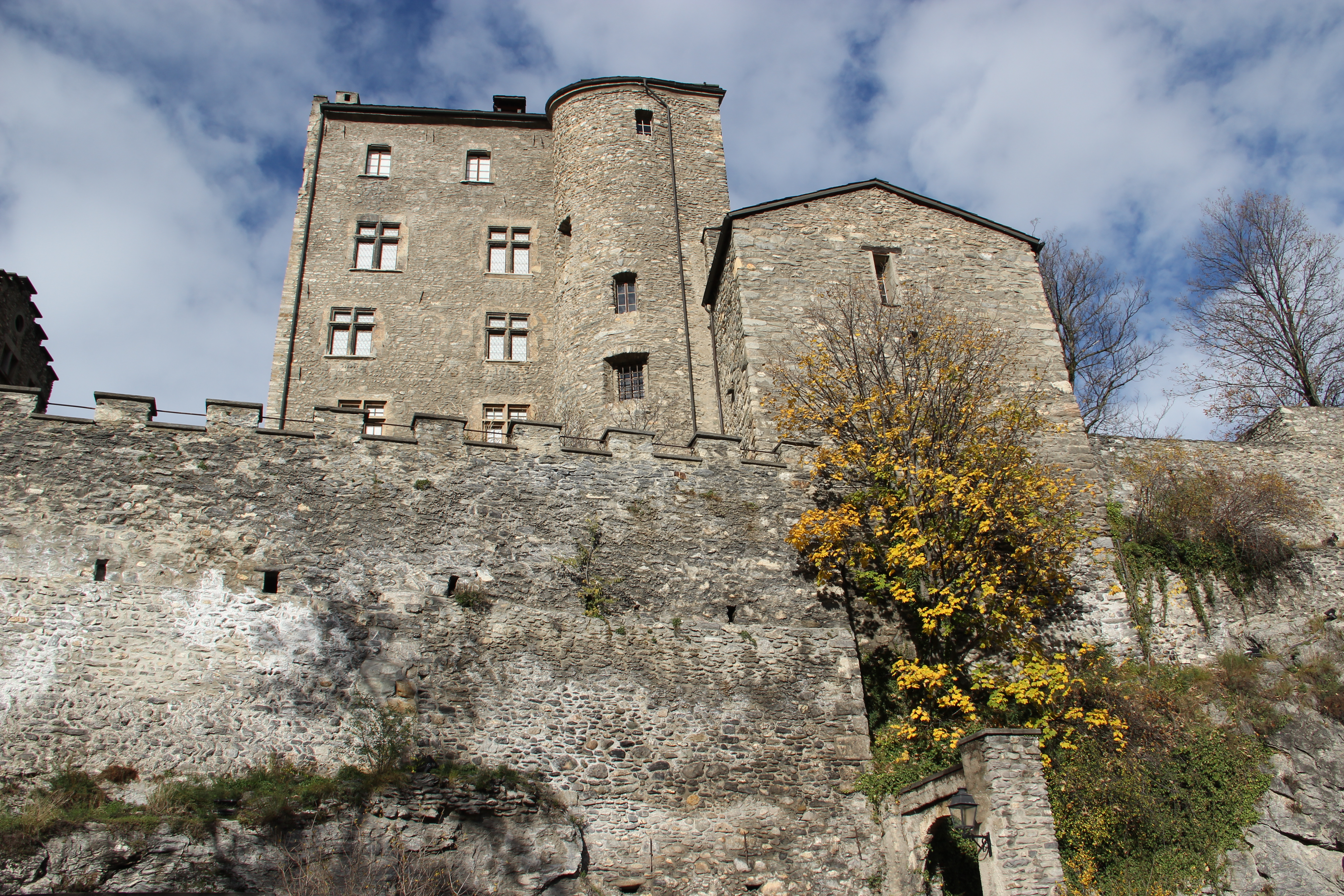
The Majorie tower and its terraced walls

The castle is composed of two main buildings: the Majorie and the Vidomnat. The Majorie is a high tower dominating the site and protected by imposing terraced walls. The Vidomnat, located below and westward of the Majorie tower, is made up of two three-storey square towers, which were probably conjoined after their construction.

== History ==
The existence of the Vidomnat is mentioned as early as 1179. The presence of the Majorie tower is attested as of 1221, when its St Michel's Chapel is mentioned for the first time. The Majorie is then called the Tour de Sion (Sion Tower). On 15 January 1373, the castle was bought by Bishop Guichard Tavelli, and served from then on as the official residence for the Prince-bishops of Sion. The castle then became the Prince-bishops' seat of power. They preferred it to the more austere Tourbillon Castle, which was less accessible. The Majorie tower probably contained reception rooms, and the buildings that served as bishops' habitation have not been preserved. In 1529, a fire destroyed the castle. It was rebuilt in 1536 under Bishop Adrian I of Riedmatten.

During the 17th century, political power over Valais was shared between the bishops and the cantonal Diet, but the Diet met in the Majorie Castle. A fire broke out again in 1788 and destroyed the archives of the Diocese of Sion. Despite several reconstruction projects, the castle was left as it was, and the bishops eventually built their palace near the Sion Cathedral in 1839–1840. The State of Valais then bought the Majorie Castle and installed barracks there.

The Majorie Castle has been housing the Valais Museum of Fine Arts since 1947. The Grange-à-l'Évêque (Bishop's Barn), the former stables of the castle, has been home to the Valais Nature Museum since 2013.

== See also ==
- List of castles in Switzerland
- Château
- History of Valais
- Tourbillon Castle
- Valère Basilica
