= Valère Basilica =

- Basilica of Our Lady in Valère
- Basilique Notre-Dame de Valère
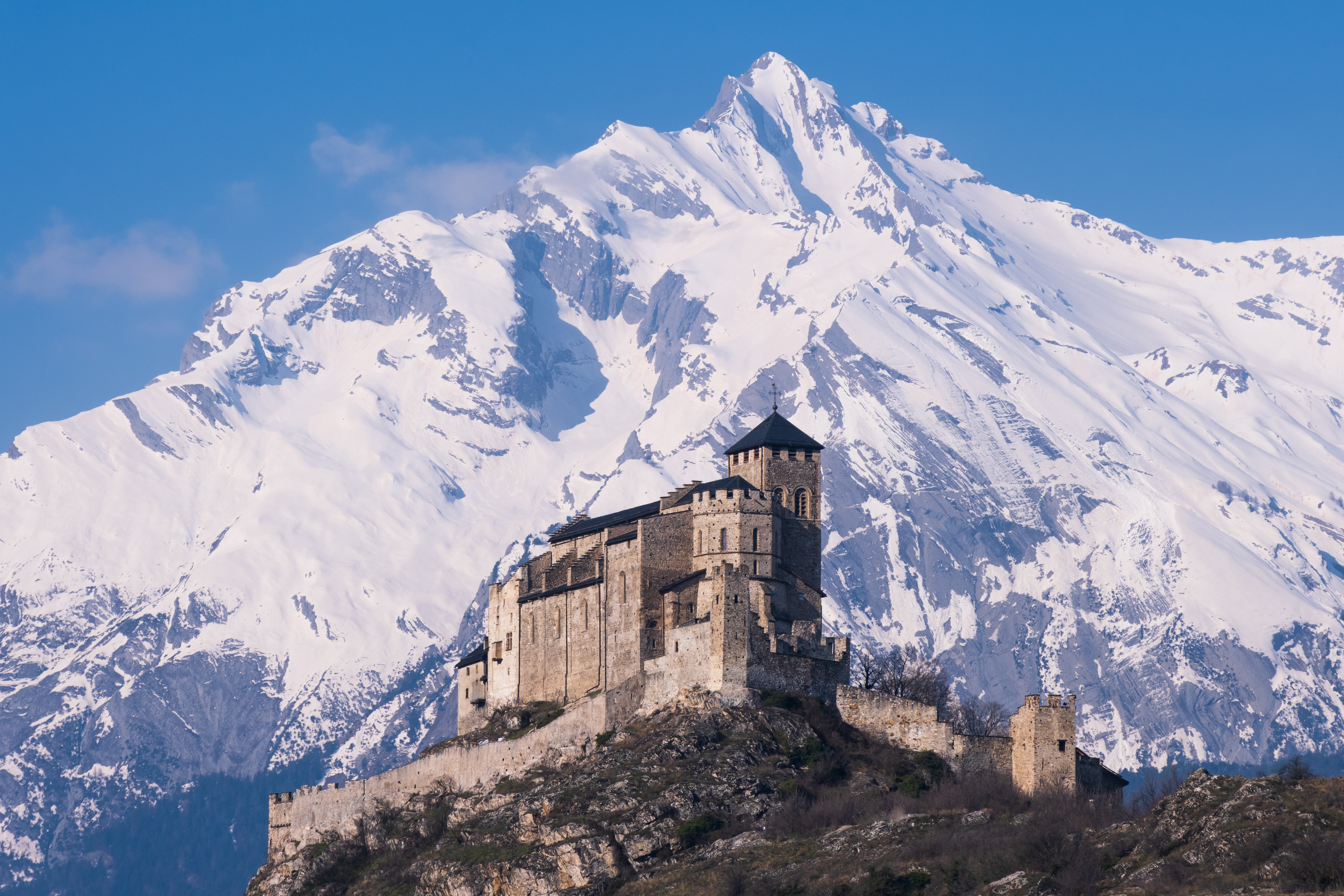
- Valère Castle and Haut de Cry, as seen from Sion

- Location of Valère Basilica in Switzerland
- 46°14′02″N 7°21′52″E
- Location: Sion, Valais, Switzerland
- Denomination: Roman Catholic
- Website: Valeria

History
- Status: Minor basilica
- Founded: 1200–1300

Architecture
- Functional status: Active
- Heritage designation: Cultural Property of National Significance
- Architectural type: Basilica
- Style: Romanesque, Gothic

Administration
- Diocese: Roman Catholic Diocese of Sion

Swiss Cultural Property of National Significance
- Official name: Église et château Notre-Dame de Valère
- Reference no.: 7037

The Valère Basilica (French: Basilique de Valère), also called Valère castle (French: Château de Valère), is a fortified Roman Catholic church situated in Sion in the canton of Valais in Switzerland. It is located on a hill and faces the Château de Tourbillon, situated on the opposite hill. It is a Swiss heritage site of national significance.

== Geography ==
=== Location ===
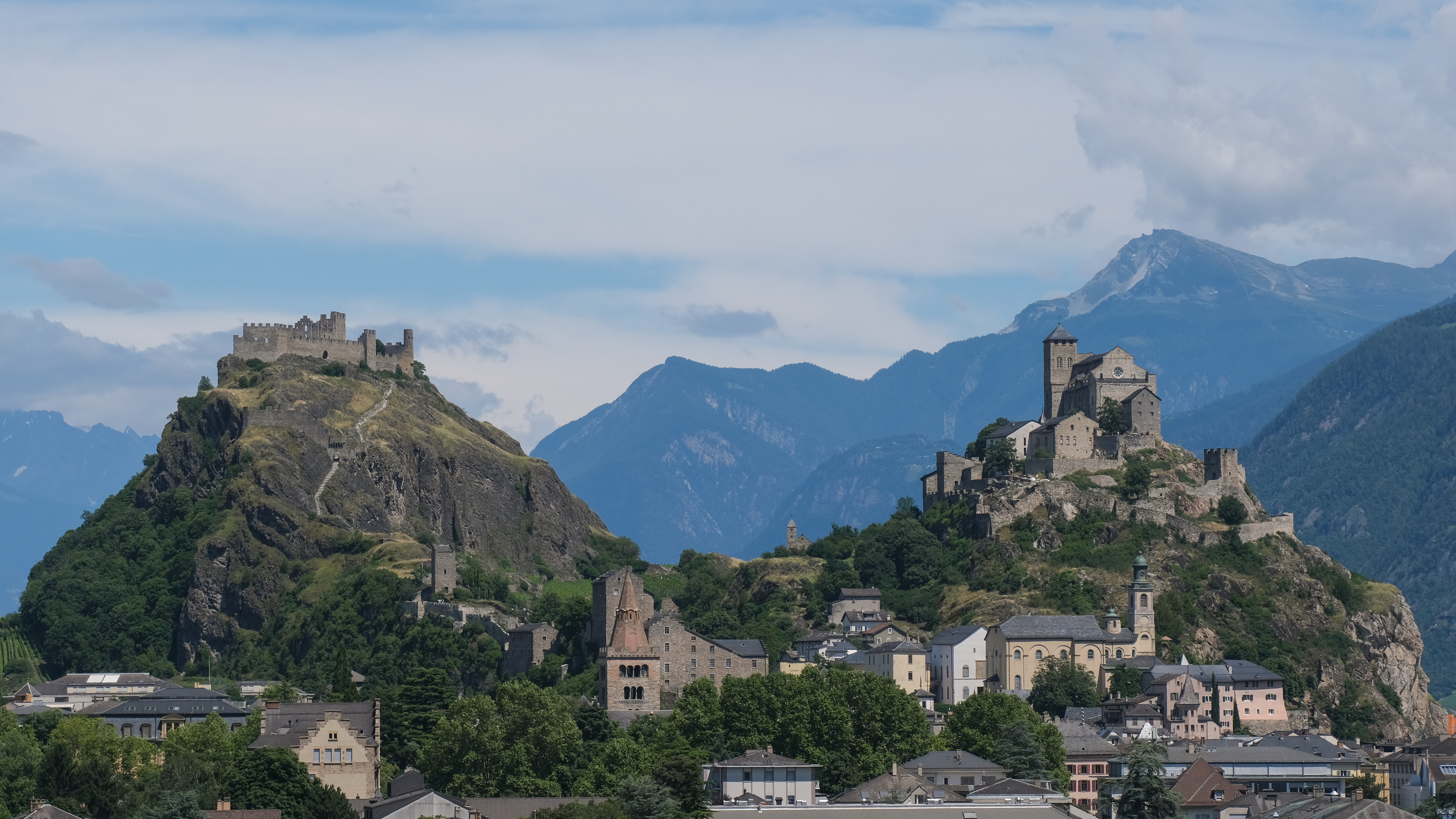
The Valère and Tourbillon castles as seen from Sion.

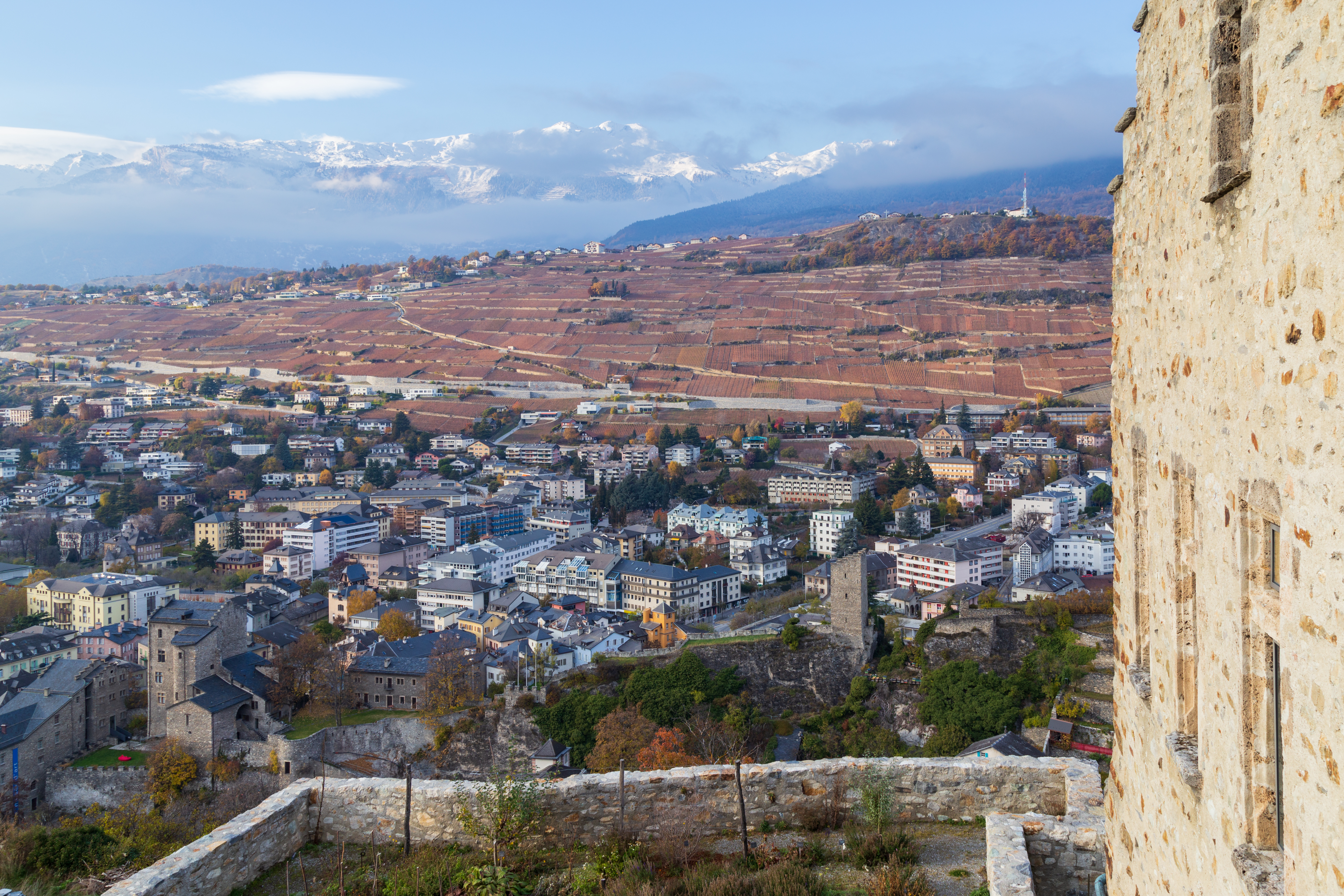
View from the Basilika to Sion

The castle of Valère is located on the Valère hill at 615 meters (2,018 ft) above sea level and dominates the town of Sion in the canton of Valais, Switzerland. The castle's church is located at the top of the hill, the fortified village and its walls surround it. The relief of the Valère hill is very uneven and access to the castle is only possible from the north-east.

=== Fauna and flora ===
Since 1977, the site has been included in the Federal Inventory of Sites and Monuments of National Importance due to the large number of protected species present on Valère Hill. The fauna of the hill includes the European green lizard (Lacerta viridis), the European mantis (Mantis religiosa), the scarce swallowtail (Iphiclides podalirius), the green-underside blue (Glaucopsyche alexis), the blue-winged grasshopper (Oedipoda caerulescens), the rock bunting (Emberiza cia), the common redstart (Phoenicurus phoenicurus), the common raven (Corvus Corax) and the common kestrel (Falco tinnunculus). Valère's flora is composed of a feather grass (Stipa) species, Ephedra distachya, Indian fig (Opuntia humifusa), hoary berteroa (Berteroa incana), early star-of-Bethlehem (Gagea bohemica), cotton thistle (Onopordum acanthium), motherwort (Leonurus cardiaca) and patience dock (Rumex patientia).

4.9 hectares (530,000 sq ft) of the Tourbillon Hill are also included in the catalogue of protected places in the category of dry meadows and pastures of national importance. This area was so classified in 2017 with the aim of conserving Switzerland's dry meadows and pastures, almost 95% of which have disappeared since 1900.

== History ==
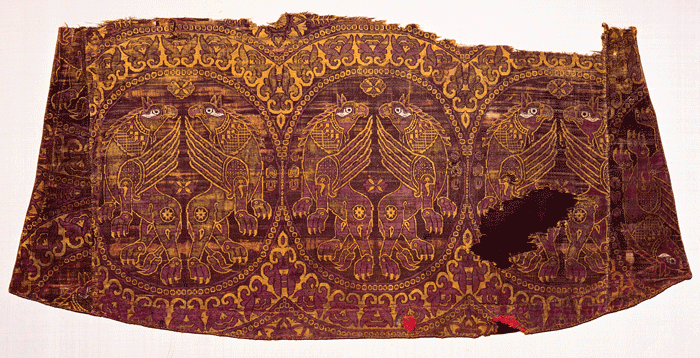
11th century Byzantine robe, silk with griffins. Valère treasury.

The Diocese was founded in Octodurum, now called Martigny, in the early 4th century. In 589 the bishop, St. Heliodorus, transferred the see to Sion, as Octodurum was frequently endangered by the inundations of the Rhone and the Drance. Very little is known about the early Bishops and the early churches in Sion. However, in the late 10th century the last King of Upper Burgundy Rudolph III, granted the County of Valais to Bishop Hugo (998–1017). The combination of spiritual and secular power made the Prince-Bishops the most powerful nobles in the Upper Rhone valley. Sion became the political and religious center of the region. By the 12th century they began building impressive churches and castles in Sion to represent their power and administer their estates. Valère, as the residence of the cathedral chapter in Sion, was one-third of the administrative center of the powerful Diocese of Sion. In the 12th century the Cathedral Notre Dame de Sion (du Glarier) was built in the town below Valère hill. Glarier Cathedral became the seat of the Diocese of Sion, while the Prince-Bishop of Sion lived in Tourbillon Castle.

The name Valère is first mentioned in 1049 as the site of the cathedral chapter in Sion. The first parts of the church were built between 1100 and 1130 in the Romanesque style. The next construction phase began after 1130 and included the semi-circular apse, the walls and windows and a roof. The third phase saw the church expand and the style changed to the new Gothic style. Between 1235 and 1267 the nave expanded and was flanked with two aisles. During the 13th century, the choir was covered with a Gothic ribbed vault and a rood screen was installed to separate the chancel from the nave. The famous organ was installed around 1430–1435 and other than a modification in the 1700s is essentially unchanged. The murals date from about 1435 as well. The Gothic marble statue of the Madonna with the baby Jesus was added in the 15th century over the high altar. The current choir stalls were added in the mid-17th century.

The church obtained the rank of minor basilica in the Roman Catholic tradition on 7 October 1987, during the visit of Pope John Paul II.

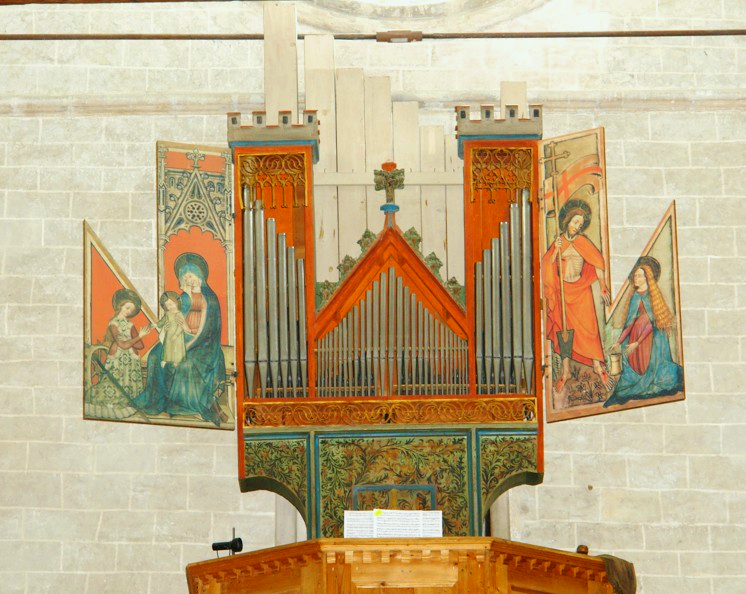
The Basilica's Organ

== Valère organ ==
The Pipe organ on the west side of the Valère Basilica, believed to have been built in 1435, is one of the oldest functioning in the world. It was probably brought to the church by Guillaume de Rarogne, who eventually ended up as the bishop of Sion. Its pipes are arranged to form a rough outline of a church; the larger pipes form two towers, and the smaller ones create a triangular church roof. The organ was modified in the 1700s to play Baroque music, but otherwise remains essentially unchanged. It was renovated in 1954.
