= Joseph Anton Blatter =

Swiss priest

- Bishop of Sion; Count and Prefect of the Valais
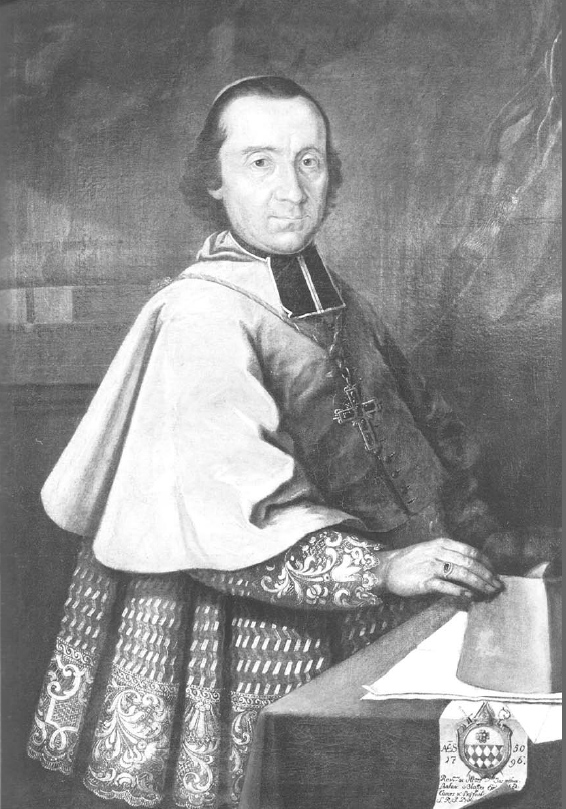
- Blatter in 1796, aged 50
- Diocese: Sion
- Elected: 3 August 1790
- Installed: 1790
- Term ended: 1799 (continued until 1807 as Bishop)
- Predecessor: Franz Melchior Zen-Ruffinen
- Successor: Joseph-François-Xavier de Preux

Orders
- Consecration: 13 February 1791

Personal details
- Born: 8 March 1745 Visp, Republic of the Seven Tithings
- Died: 19 March 1807 (aged 62) Sion, Rhodanic Republic

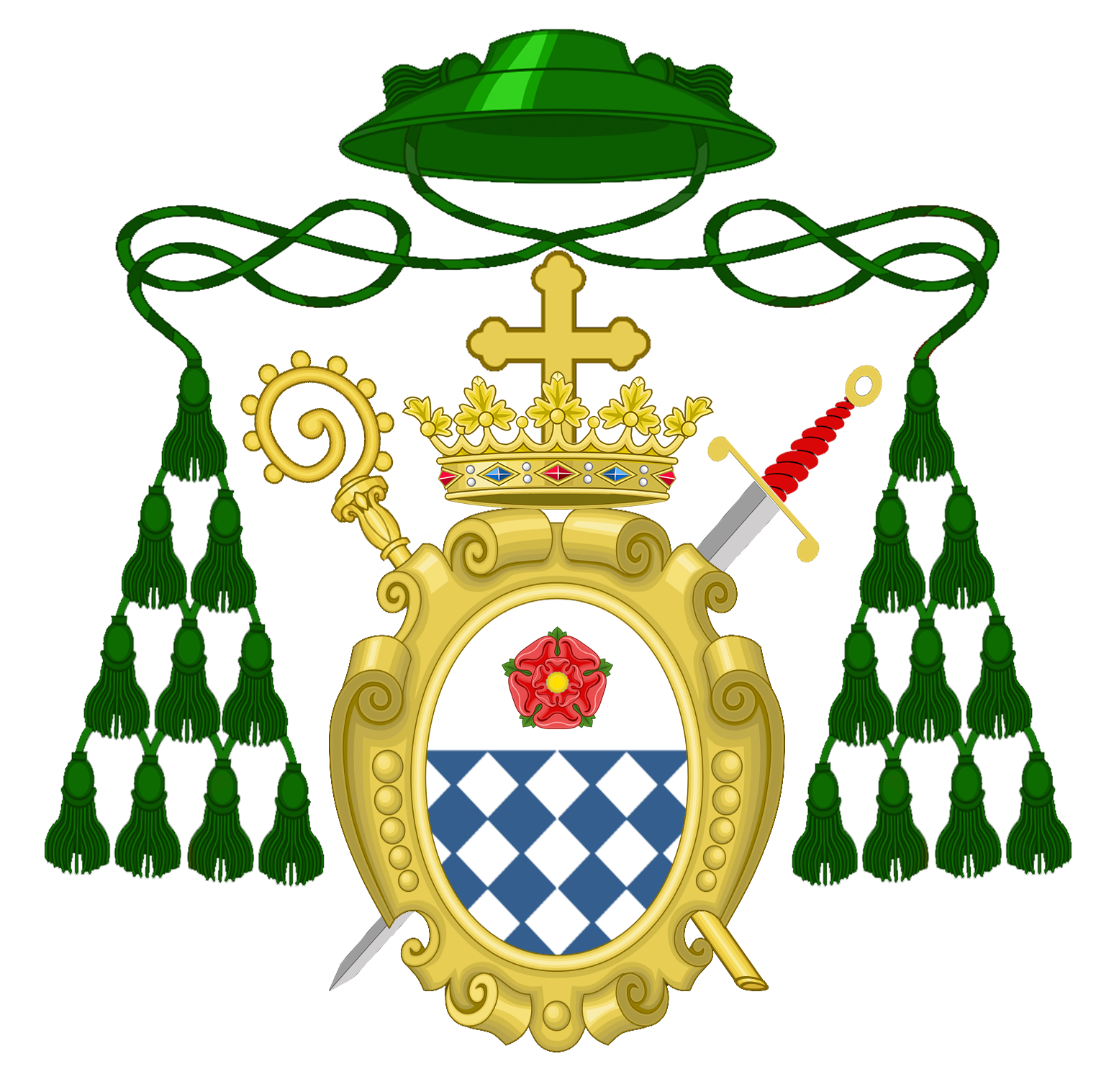
Coat of Arms of the Prince Bishop

Joseph Anton Blatter (also known in French as Joseph-Antoine Blatter; 8 March 1745 — 19 March 1807) was a Swiss prelate and the 73rd and last Prince-bishop of the Diocese of Sion, in the Republic of the Seven Tithings, in the modern Canton of Valais, from 1790 to 1799, and after the French invasion and dissolution of the republic, Bishop of Sion until his death in 1807.

His time in office was marked by the turmoil generated by the French Revolution, insurrections in the French-speaking Lower Valais, and the French invasion of Switzerland, culminating in the end of the ancien régime in Valais.

== Historical background ==
In 1634, after decades of decreasing political influence of the bishopric over the Valais, the prince-bishop of Sion, Hildebrand II Jost, renounced the temporal power exercised by the office, putting an end to a period of church rule in Valais that had started in 999, and marking the official establishment of the (already existent de facto) Republic of the Seven Tithings. The political role of the prince-bishops was therefore reduced to honorary functions and the right to a voice in the Diet of the republic, which they also presided over.

== Life ==
Blatter was born in Visp, the son of Anna Maria Schiner, from Ernen, and Johann Arnold Blatter. His great-uncle, Johann Joseph Blatter (1684-1752), was the prince-bishop at the time of his birth. Through his mother he was related to the powerful Schiner family, which through centuries provided many high government officials for the Valais, the most famous one being Matthäus Schiner (1465-1522), who reigned as prince-bishop and participated in the Italian Wars.

After having his early education in Brig and Sion, he studied philosophy in Lyon and theology in Vienna. In 1769 he was ordained as priest in Vienna and, in the same year, as canon in Sion. He was elected Prince-bishop of the diocese on 3 August 1790, and consecrated in the Cathedral of Sion on 12 February 1791. Two years prior to his election, in 1788, a great fire had swept through Sion, destroying most of the city, including the residence of the prince-bishop, the Château de Tourbillon. Although Blatter by 1793 had plans to rebuild it, the politic upheavals and later the French invasion ended any possibility for such project In the period from 1792 to 1794 he gave asylum to many clergy and lay people fleeing from the Reign of Terror in France, including a Trappist and a Poor Clare convent.

In 1798, after the revolution became widespread in the Lower Valais, on March 16 a constituent assembly proclaimed at the Abbey of Saint-Maurice the short lived République des Dix Dizains (Republic of the Ten Tithings): the three dizains of Monthey, Saint-Maurice and Entremont joined the top seven dizains. Few months later, after the French invasion under the Directory, the Valais was incorporated into the newly created Helvetic Republic. Following the crushing of the last revolt in the Upper Valais against the French troops in the Battle of Finges, in May 1799, Blatter went into exile in Novara for months.

In 1805, he offered his resignation to the Holy See, which was denied by Pope Pius VII. He died in Sion, on 19 March 1807, and was succeeded as bishop by Joseph-François-Xavier de Preux.

== See also ==
- List of Bishops of Sion
- History of the Valais

Preceded by Franz Melchior Zen-Ruffinen	Prince-bishop of Sion; 1790-1799	Succeeded by office abolished

Preceded by Franz Melchior Zen-Ruffinen	Bishop of Sion; 1790-1807	Succeeded by Joseph-François-Xavier de Preux
