= Battle on the Planta =

1475 battle in Europe

- Part of Burgundian Wars
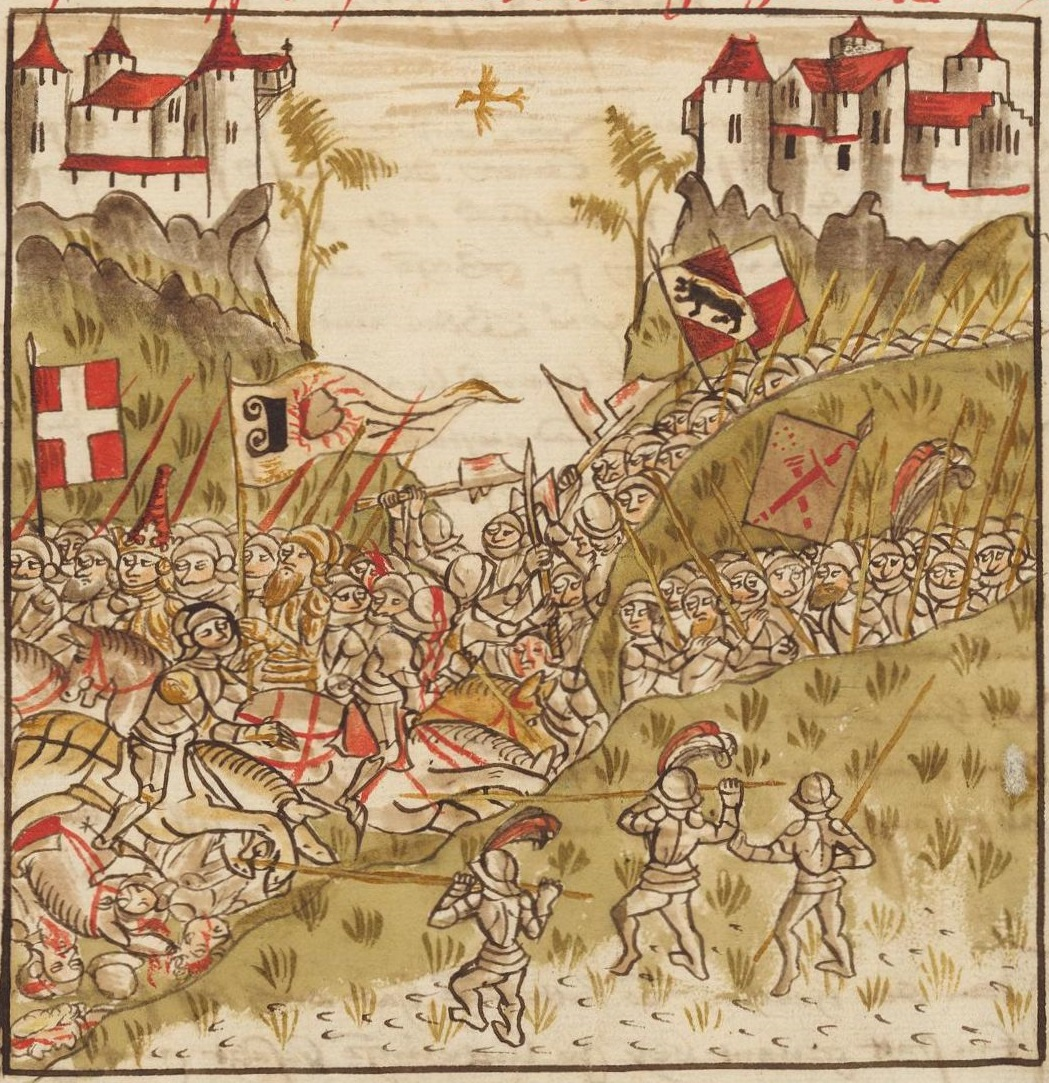
- Battle of the Planta by Gerold Edlibach, 1486
Date	13 November 1475
Location	Between Conthey and Sion, Valais, Switzerland 46°13′N 7°21′E
Result	Upper Valais/Swiss Victory

Belligerents
Duchy of Savoy	Swiss Confederation; Upper Valais (Prince-Bishopric of Sion)

Commanders and leaders
unknown	Hans am Hengart; Hans Asperlin; Walter Supersaxo

Strength
10,000 men, including 1,500 knights	3,000 Confederates; 3,000–4,000 Valais

Casualties and losses
1,000 men, including 300 knights	Light
- Location within Canton of Valais Battle on the Planta (Switzerland)

The Battle on the Planta, fought on 13 November 1475 around Conthey near Sion, Valais, Switzerland, was part of the Burgundian Wars.

== Background ==
In the 13th and 14th centuries, the Upper Valais (the eastern portion of the valley, higher in the mountains) was colonized by Germans from Hasli in the Canton of Bern. The Upper Valais was loosely allied with the Swiss, especially with Bern. The Lower Valais (the western, lowlands of the valley) were inhabited by French speakers under the power of the Dukes of Savoy. During the early and mid 15th century conflicts between the Upper Valais and Lower Valais often led to fighting. In 1446 Bern and Savoy signed a peace treaty, though border conflicts over the following decades damaged the agreement. In 1473 Duchess Yolande of Savoy embargoed Bern.

== Battle ==
In 1475 Bern invaded Vaud, a Savoy province, and signed an alliance with the Upper Valais on 7 September 1475. With Bernese support the Upper Valais prepared for war. Led by the Bishop of Sion Walter Supersaxo the Upper Valais forces began attacking Savoy holdings. A Savoy counterattack in early November threatened the city of Sion. On 13 November the Bishop's forces together with unexpected reinforcements from Saanen, the Simmental, Fribourg, and Solothurn defeated the Savoy counterattack near Conthey to the west of Sion.

== Aftermath ==
Following the Savoy defeat at the battle, the bishop's army marched west conquering the Lower Valais as far as Saint-Maurice and capturing a total of 17 Savoyard castles. The towns of Conthey and Saint-Maurice were garrisoned by Bern and Fribourg and Savoy was cut off from Italy. In 1477, the bishop annexed much of the Lower Valais, though it was not accepted by Savoy until 1528. The Confederate support strengthened the ties between Valais and the Swiss Confederation.
