= List of bishops of Sion =

List of bishops of the Roman Catholic Diocese of Sion:

== Late Antiquity ==
Bishops of Agaunum (Octodurum)

From	To	Bishop	Notes
fl. 380s		Theodore	
fl. 440		Salvius/Silvius	
fl. 490		Prothais	
	516(?)	Theodore II(?)	
517		Constantinus	
549		Rufus	
565		Agricola	

== Early Middle Ages ==
From	To	Bishop	Notes
585		Heliodorus	
613	614	Leudemond	
647	653	Prothais	
673	690	Saint Aimé	
762	765	Willicar	
786/8	796/8	Altheus	
fl. 805		Theodore III(?)	According to 12th-century legend, secular power was granted to the bishops of Sion by Charlemagne
fl. 824		Adalongus	
825	857	Heyminus	
877	899/900	Waltherius	
932		Asmundus	
fl. 940		Manfredus (?)	
983	984/5	Amizo	

== Prince-bishops of Sion ==
=== Middle Ages ===
From	To	Bishop	Notes
993/4	1018/20	Hugues	First prince-bishop, granted secular power by Rudolph III of Burgundy in c. 999
1034	1053/4	Aymon of Savoy	Succeeded his brother Buchardus as Abbot of St Maurice in 1049 or 1050
1054	1087-1090	Ermenfroi	
fl. 1092		Gausbertus	
1107	1116	Vilencus	
1135	1138	Boson	
1138	1150	Saint Guérin	
1150	1162(?)	Louis	
1162	1168 (?)	Amédée of La Tour	
1176	1177	Guillaume of Blonay	
1179	1181 or 1184	Conon	
1184(?)	1196	Guillaume of Candie	
1196	1203	Nantelme of Écublens	
1203	1205	Guillaume of Saillon	
1206	1237	Landry of Mont	
1237	1243	Boson II of Granges	
1243	1271	Henri of Rarogne	
1271	1273	Rodolphe of Valpelline	
1273	1287	Pierre of Oron	
February 1287	15 December 1289		vacant
1289	1308	Boniface of Challant	
1308	1323	Aymon of Châtillon	
1323	1338	Aymon of La Tour	
1338	1342	Philippe of Chamberlhac	
1342	1375	Guichard Tavelli	Murdered by defenestration
1375	1386	Édouard of Savoy	

=== Western Schism ===
loyal to Avignon

From	To	Bishop	Notes
1386	1386	Guillaume of La Baume-Saint-Amourb	
1387	1387	Robert Chambrier	
1388	1392	Humbert de Billens	
1398	1404	Aymon Séchala	
1404	1417	Jacques (Antoine?) de Challant	

loyal to Rome

From	To	Bishop	Notes
1387	1388	Gerardus (Girard Tavel?)	
1392	1393	Henri de Blanchis	
1394	1402	Guillaume IV ("the Good") of Rarogne	
1402	1418	Guillaume V of Rarogne	see Raron affair

=== Renaissance to early modern ===
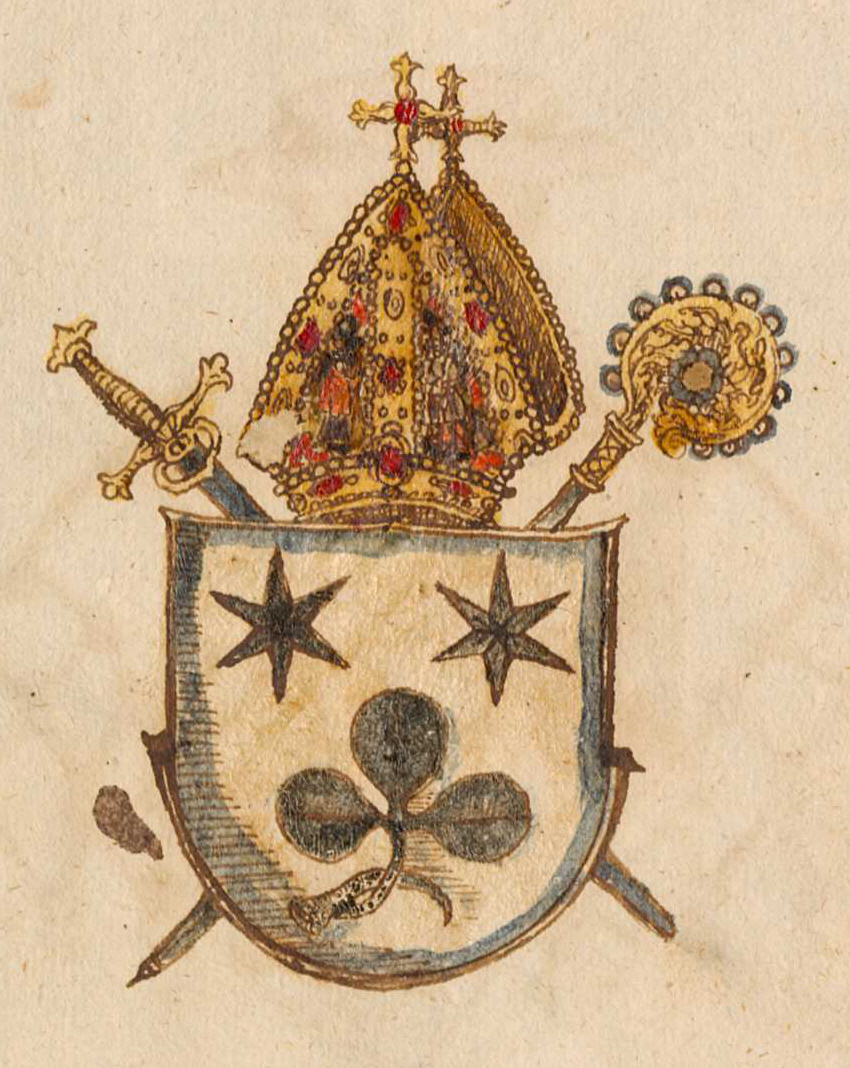
Coat of arms of Hildebrand of Riedmatten (1594). The prince-bishops used their family coats of arms; the Riedmatten coat of arms was in use for much of the early modern period (1529–1545, 1565–1613, 1640–1701) and is presented as coat of arms of the bishopric in e.g. Siebmacher (1605).

From	To	Bishop	Notes
1418	1437	André dei Benzi of Gualdo	Archbishop of Kolocza (in Hungary); administrator from 1418, bishop from 1431. Valais witch trials.
1437	1451	Guillaume VI of Rarogne	
1451	1457	Henri Asperlin	
1457	1482	Walter Supersaxo	Burgundian War
1482	1496	Jost of Silenen (d. 1498)	Member of Lucerne nobility (uncle of Kaspar von Silenen) and diplomat for the Swiss Confederacy, bishop of Grenoble 1477–1467, Jost ruled as a "Renaissance prince" but after failed campaigns against Milan was forced to abdicate and went into exile in Lyon, retaining only the title of titular bishop of Hierapolis.
1496	1499	Nicolas Schiner	
1499	1522	Mathieu Schiner	Cardinal; nephew of Nicolas Schiner
1522	1528	Philippe am Hengart (not recognised by the Pope) Philippe de Platea (not recognised locally)	
1529	1545	Adrien I of Riedmatten	Valais becomes an eternal associate of the Old Swiss Confederacy in 1529.
1548	1565	Jean Jordan	
1565	1604	Hildebrand I of Riedmatten	Banned protestantism in 1604
1604	1613	Adrien II of Riedmatten	
1613	1638	Hildebrand II Jost	In 1628, the Valais becomes a republic, but remains under the nominal rule of the prince-bishops.
1638	1640	Barthélemy Supersaxo	
1640	1646	Adrien III of Riedmatten	
1646	1672	Adrien IV of Riedmatten	
1672	1701	Adrien V of Riedmatten	
1701	1734	François-Joseph Supersaxo	
1734	1752	Jean-Joseph-Arnold Blatter	
1752	1760	Jean-Hildebrand Roten	
1760	1780	François-Joseph-Frédéric Ambuel	
1780	1790	François-Melchior-Joseph Zen-Ruffinen	
1790	1807	Joseph Anton Blatter	Last prince-bishop, loss of secular power with the French invasion of 1798.

== Modern history ==
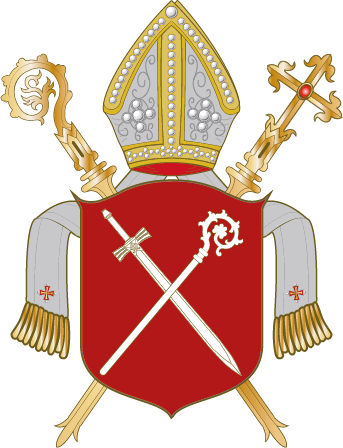
Modern coat of arms

From	To	Bishop	Notes
1807	1817	Joseph-François-Xavier de Preux	
1817	1829	Auguste-Sulpice Zen-Ruffinen	
1830	1843	Maurice-Fabien Roten	
1843	1875	Pierre-Joseph de Preux	
1875	1901	Adrien VI Jardinier	
1901	11 July 1918	Jules-Maurice Abbet	Born 11 September 1845
1919	19 March 1952	Victor Bieler	Born 16 March 1881
1952	1975	François-Nestor Adam	Born 7 February 1903; died 8 February 1990
1975	1995	Henri Schwery	Born 14 June 1932
1995	2014	Norbert Brunner	Born 21 June 1942
2014		Jean-Marie Lovey	Born 2 August 1950
