= Visp =

- Municipality
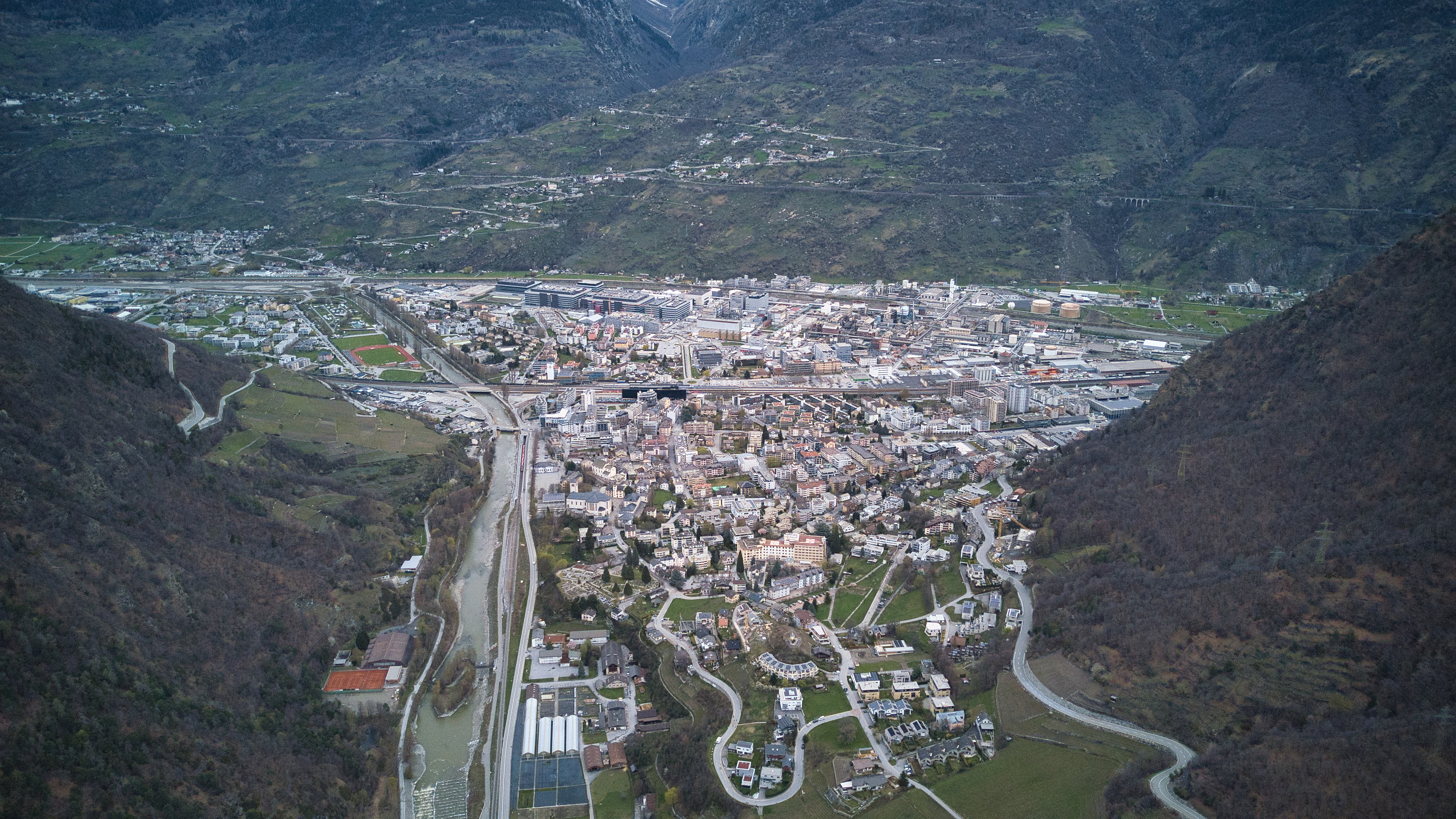
- Visp as seen from the south

- Flag Coat of arms
- Location of Visp
- Location within Switzerland Location within Canton of Valais
- Coordinates: 46°17′45″N 7°53′00″E
- Country: Switzerland
- Canton: Valais
- District: Visp

Government
  - Mayor: Niklaus Furger

Area
  - Total: 13.22 km^{2} (5.10 sq mi)
- Elevation: 658 m (2,159 ft)

Population (December 2025)
  - Total: 8'971
  - Density: 0.61/km^{2} (1.6/sq mi)
- Time zone: UTC+01:00 (CET)
  - Summer (DST): UTC+02:00 (CEST)
- Postal code: 3930
- SFOS number: 6297
- ISO 3166 code: CH-VS
- Surrounded by: Baltschieder, Brig-Glis, Bürchen, Lalden, Raron, Visperterminen, Zeneggen
- Website: www.visp.ch/en

Visp (German: [fɪʃp]; French: Viège [vjɛʒ]; Walser: Fischp) is a municipality, a town, and the capital of the district of Visp in the canton of Valais in Switzerland.

== Geography ==
Aerial view from 100 m by Walter Mittelholzer (1919)

Visp lies in the Rhône valley, at the confluence of the Vispa and the Rhône, 9 km (6 mi) west of Brig-Glis.

Visp has an area, as of 2011, of 13.2 square kilometers (5.1 square miles). Of this area, 17.0% is used for agricultural purposes, while 59.7% is forested. Of the rest of the land, 19.5% is settled (buildings or roads) and 3.9% is unproductive land.

The proposed merger of the municipalities of Eggerberg, Ausserberg, Bürchen, Baltschieder, Visp and Visperterminen was rejected by the residents.

== Coat of arms ==
The blazon of the municipal coat of arms is Per pale Argent and Gules, two Lions rampant reguardant counterchanged.

== Demographics ==
Visp has a population (as of December 2020) of 8,060. As of 2008, 19.3% of the population are resident foreign nationals. Over the last 10 years (2000–2010) the population has changed at a rate of 5.8%. It has changed at a rate of 4.5% due to migration and at a rate of 1.1% due to births and deaths.

Most of the population (as of 2000) speaks German (5,778 or 88.2%) as their first language, Serbo-Croatian is the second most common (192 or 2.9%) and Albanian is the third (139 or 2.1%). There are 107 people who speak French, 111 people who speak Italian and 3 people who speak Romansh.

As of 2008, the population was 49.5% male and 50.5% female. The population was made up of 2,671 Swiss men (39.0% of the population) and 713 (10.4%) non-Swiss men. There were 2,808 Swiss women (41.0%) and 650 (9.5%) non-Swiss women. Of the population in the municipality, 2,556 or about 39.0% were born in Visp and lived there in 2000. There were 2,138 or 32.6% who were born in the same canton, while 588 or 9.0% were born somewhere else in Switzerland, and 1,033 or 15.8% were born outside of Switzerland.

As of 2000, children and teenagers (0–19 years old) make up 23.4% of the population, while adults (20–64 years old) make up 61.6% and seniors (over 64 years old) make up 15%.

As of 2000, there were 2,730 people who were single and never married in the municipality. There were 3,191 married individuals, 378 widows or widowers and 251 individuals who are divorced.

As of 2000, there were 2,536 private households in the municipality, and an average of 2.4 persons per household. There were 721 households that consist of only one person and 171 households with five or more people. In 2000, a total of 2,349 apartments (87.9% of the total) were permanently occupied, while 257 apartments (9.6%) were seasonally occupied and 66 apartments (2.5%) were empty. As of 2009, the construction rate of new housing units was 5.4 new units per 1000 residents.

As of 2003 the average price to rent an average apartment in Visp was 923.95 Swiss francs (CHF) per month (US$740, £420, €590 approx. exchange rate from 2003). The average rate for a one-room apartment was 436.43 CHF (US$350, £200, €280), a two-room apartment was about 610.65 CHF (US$490, £270, €390), a three-room apartment was about 833.36 CHF (US$670, £380, €530) and a six or more room apartment cost an average of 936.90 CHF (US$750, £420, €600). The average apartment price in Visp was 82.8% of the national average of 1116 CHF. The vacancy rate for the municipality, in 2010, was 0.95%.

The historical population is given in the following chart:

== Sights ==
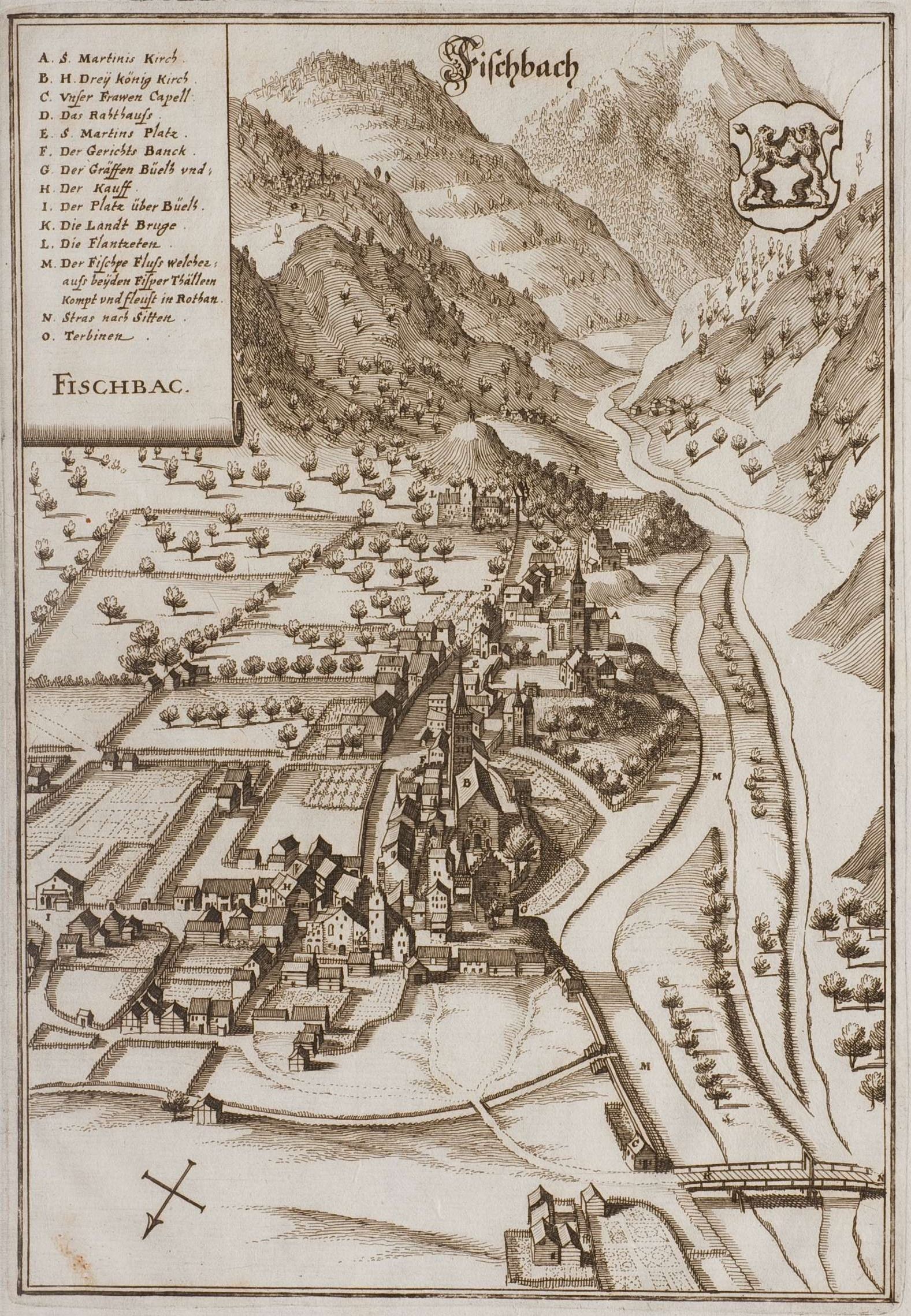
Engraving by Matthäus Merian, 1654.

The entire small city of Visp is designated as part of the Inventory of Swiss Heritage Sites.

== Politics ==
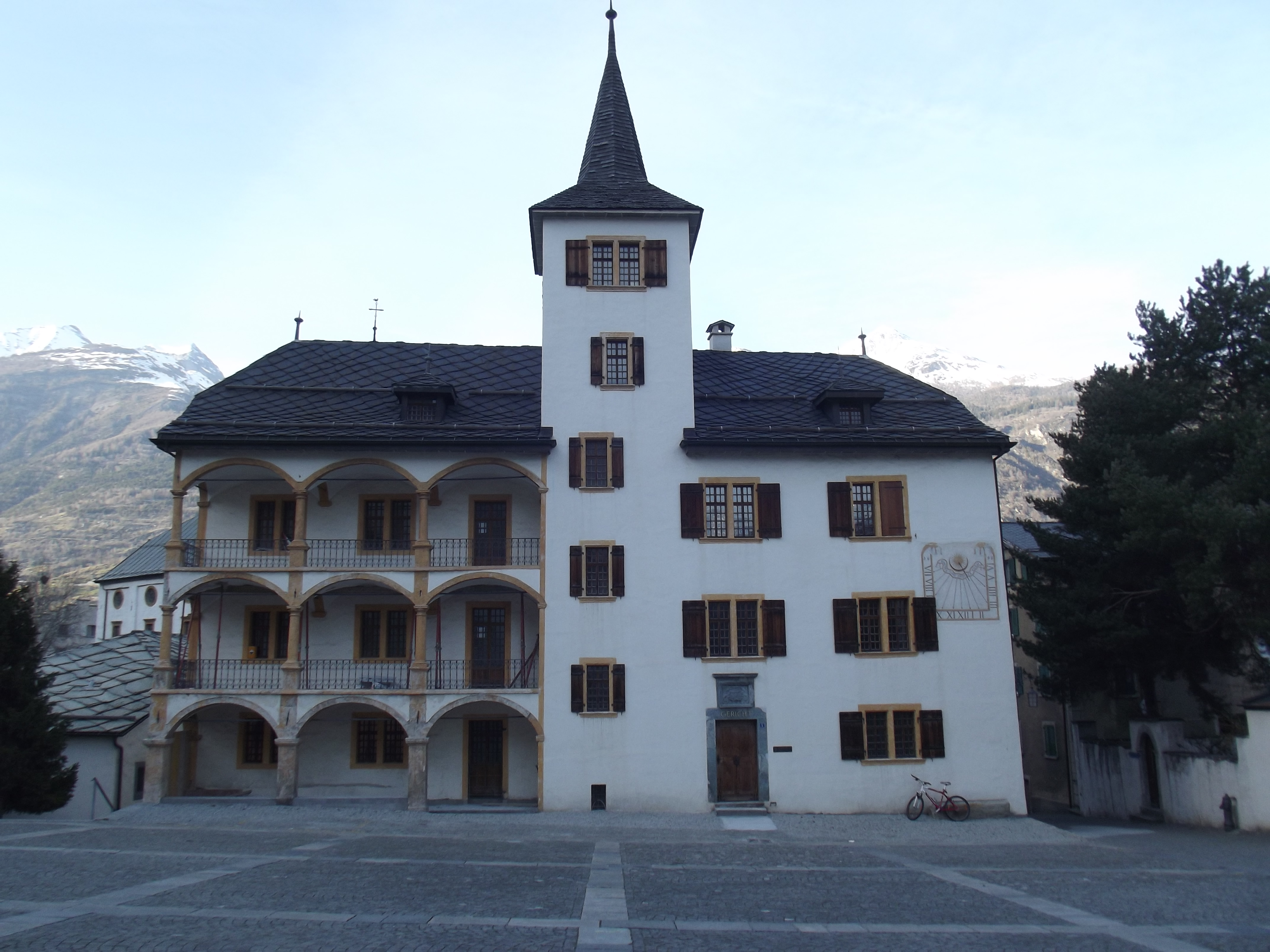
Visp Town hall

In the 2007 federal election the most popular party was the CVP which received 62.91% of the vote. The next three most popular parties were the SP (16.23%), the SVP (14.67%) and the FDP (3.81%). In the federal election, a total of 2,732 votes were cast, and the voter turnout was 60.1%.

In the 2009 Conseil d'État/Staatsrat election a total of 2,235 votes were cast, of which 239 or about 10.7% were invalid. The voter participation was 49.3%, which is much less than the cantonal average of 54.67%. In the 2007 Swiss Council of States election a total of 2,731 votes were cast, of which 74 or about 2.7% were invalid. The voter participation was 60.6%, which is similar to the cantonal average of 59.88%.

== Economy ==
The major employer in the town is the chemical company, LONZA AG, which employs about 5000 people. Visp is the economic centre of the region and draws workers from many surrounding towns and even from Italy. This leads to a unique situation where there are more jobs in Visp than the total population (12500 positions for a population of about 8500).

As of 2010, Visp had an unemployment rate of 2.2%. As of 2008, there were 63 people employed in the primary economic sector and about 21 businesses involved in this sector. 4,288 people were employed in the secondary sector and there were 93 businesses in this sector. 3,901 people were employed in the tertiary sector, with 420 businesses in this sector. There were 3,178 residents of the municipality who were employed in some capacity, of which females made up 40.4% of the workforce.

In 2008 the total number of full-time equivalent jobs was 7,188. The number of jobs in the primary sector was 34, all of which were in agriculture. The number of jobs in the secondary sector was 4,110 of which 3,401 or (82.7%) were in manufacturing and 608 (14.8%) were in construction. The number of jobs in the tertiary sector was 3,044. In the tertiary sector; 1,002 or 32.9% were in wholesale or retail sales or the repair of motor vehicles, 141 or 4.6% were in the movement and storage of goods, 181 or 5.9% were in a hotel or restaurant, 45 or 1.5% were in the information industry, 168 or 5.5% were the insurance or financial industry, 275 or 9.0% were technical professionals or scientists, 175 or 5.7% were in education and 788 or 25.9% were in health care.

In 2000, there were 5,635 workers who commuted into the municipality and 881 workers who commuted away. The municipality is a net importer of workers, with about 6.4 workers entering the municipality for every one leaving. About 3.2% of the workforce coming into Visp are coming from outside Switzerland. Of the working population, 11.9% used public transportation to get to work, and 39.5% used a private car.

== Lonza chemical factory in Visp ==
The Lonza chemical factory regularly makes headlines and causes concern, as attempted soil contamination is frequently discovered around Visp. This has, at times, led to gardens being rendered unusable, with the type, quantity, and precise locations of the contaminated soil often remaining unclear. Since 1987, it has been known that the Gamsenried landfill has, demonstrably, poisoned groundwater. Throughout the investigations and reassurances from Lonza, accusations against the company and the canton have arisen multiple times, alleging that they were concealing investigation results and not communicating transparently.

Switzerland's environmental concerns regarding Lonza became apparent in September 2016. At that time, Lonza threatened environmental authorities that they would consider relocating to China if they were not willing to bear the costs of a legally required air filter. The threat had an impact. Ultimately, Switzerland yielded and paid millions, far exceeding the costs of such a filter. In this context, there was also a report by Swiss television, in which serious allegations against Lonza were raised. Not only was the extensive contamination from the hazardous waste site criticized, but also Lonza's attempt to pass the costs onto the state treasury. This was particularly perplexing because Lonza consistently generated billion-dollar profits.

In 2018, it was discovered that a nicotinic acid factory at the Lonza site was responsible for around one percent of the country's greenhouse gas emissions, as the chemical synthesis route used generated nitrous oxide as a byproduct. Eventually, catalytic scrubbing technology that eliminates most of the emissions was installed in 2021.

In 2021, Lonza announced plans to create 1,200 new jobs in Visp. Lonza rapidly conducted extensive advertising both in Switzerland and internationally to fill these positions as quickly as possible. However, the municipality and the Visp region were unprepared for such an influx. Water, electricity, and accommodation facilities were not equipped to handle the needs of so many newcomers. Despite Lonza generating billions in Visp, they did not pay taxes in the Visp region. As a result, the municipality had to cover the necessary costs arising from the influx itself, which regularly led to deficits in the municipal budget. Apart from concerns about drinking water, the extreme housing shortage and the consequent soaring rental prices were also prominent issues. In May 2022, a case of social welfare made headlines, where a mother and her child were forced to live in a tent on a campsite.

== Religion ==
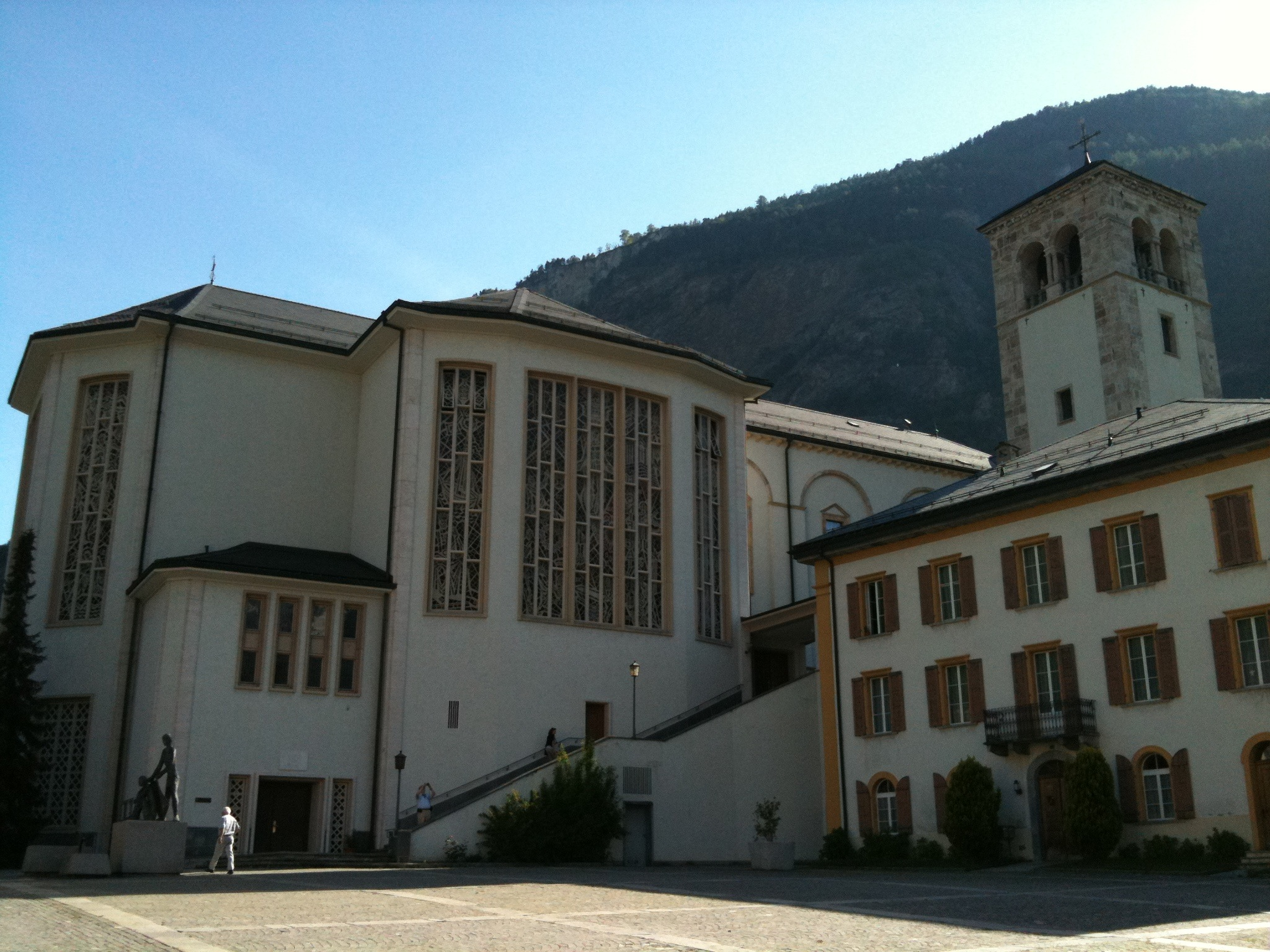
St. Martin's church

From the 2000 census, 5,390 or 82.3% were Roman Catholic, while 306 or 4.7% belonged to the Swiss Reformed Church. Of the rest of the population, there were 174 members of an Orthodox church (or about 2.66% of the population), there were 3 individuals (or about 0.05% of the population) who belonged to the Christian Catholic Church, and there were 104 individuals (or about 1.59% of the population) who belonged to another Christian church. There was 1 individual who was Jewish, and 250 (or about 3.82% of the population) who were Muslim. There were 10 individuals who were Buddhist and 3 individuals who were Hindu. 88 (or about 1.34% of the population) belonged to no church, are agnostic or atheist, and 268 individuals (or about 4.09% of the population) did not answer the question.

== Education ==
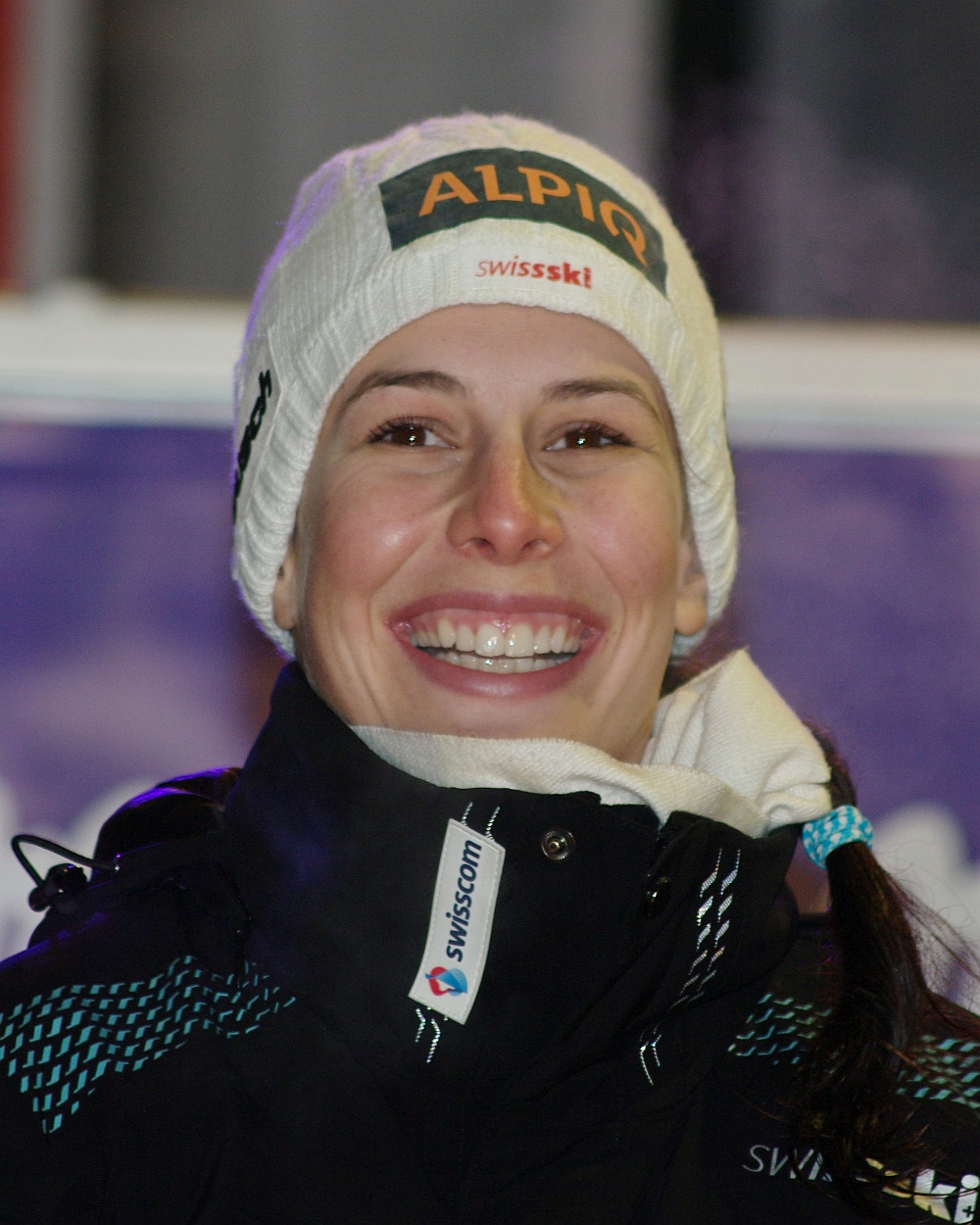
Dominique Gisin, 2011

In Visp about 2,401 or (36.7%) of the population have completed non-mandatory upper secondary education, and 715 or (10.9%) have completed additional higher education (either university or a Fachhochschule). Of the 715 who completed tertiary schooling, 64.9% were Swiss men, 18.0% were Swiss women, 11.3% were non-Swiss men and 5.7% were non-Swiss women.

During the 2010–2011 school year there were a total of 910 students in the Visp school system. The education system in the Canton of Valais allows young children to attend one year of non-obligatory Kindergarten. During that school year, there were seven kindergarten classes (KG1 or KG2) and 140 kindergarten students. The canton's school system requires students to attend six years of primary school. In Visp there were a total of 28 classes and 513 students in the primary school. The secondary school program consists of three lower, obligatory years of schooling (orientation classes), followed by three to five years of optional, advanced schools. There were 397 lower secondary students who attended school in Visp. All the upper secondary students attended school in another municipality.

As of 2000, there were 339 students in Visp who came from another municipality, while 250 residents attended schools outside the municipality.

Visp is home to the Mediathek library. The library has (as of 2008) 12,438 books or other media, and loaned out 36,395 items in the same year. It was open a total of 149 days with average of 12 hours per week during that year.

== Transportation ==
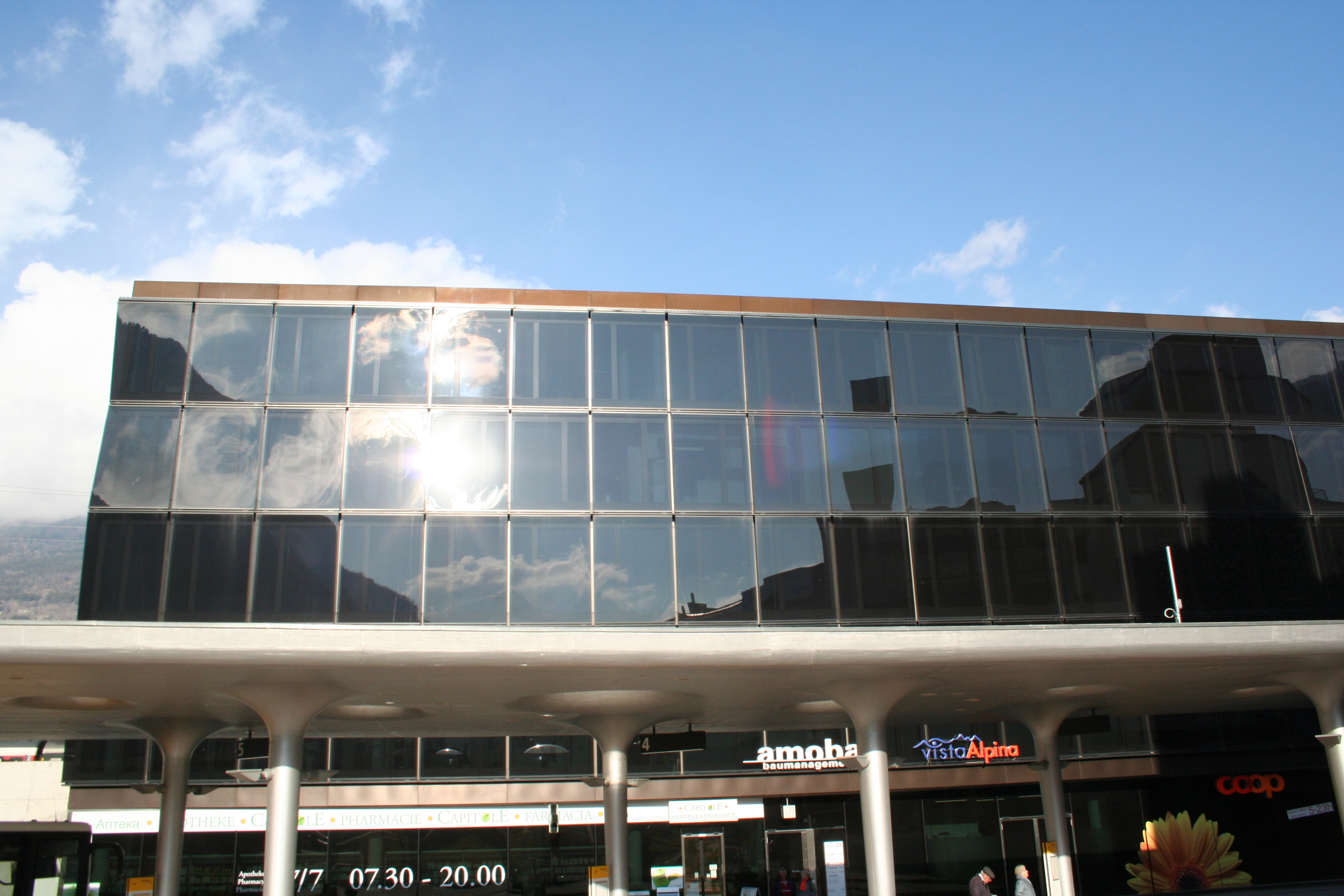
Main train station of Visp

With over 25,400 passengers per day, the Visp train station is the busiest station in the canton of Valais

Visp railway station is a junction station, with a modern station building completed in 2007. It is served by two standard gauge lines, Simplon railway and Lötschberg railway line (with services operated by Swiss Federal Railways), and a metre gauge line BVZ Zermatt-Bahn (with services operated by the Matterhorn Gotthard Bahn).

The railway and bus stations in Visp and Brig are starting points for many outdoor activities, trips, and tours in the surrounding mountain resorts Zermatt and Saas-Fee, lying at the foot of almost all the highest peaks in the Alps, such as Matterhorn, Monte Rosa, Dom and Weisshorn.

Visp is accessible via three exits on the A9 highway (Visp West, Visp South/Vispertal, and Visp East). Running parallel to this, Cantonal Road 9 passes through the city center.

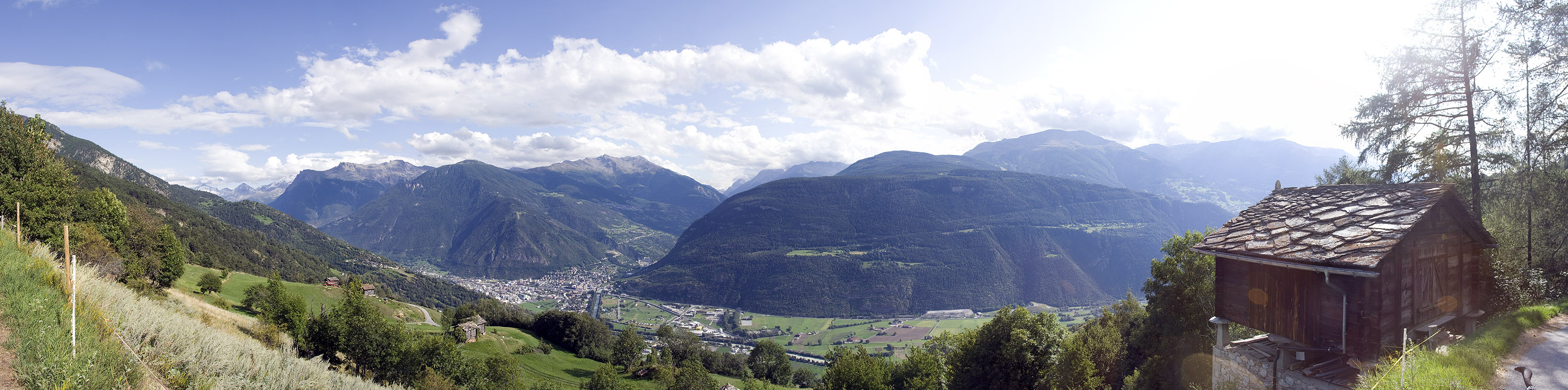
View of Visp and Vispertal from the Ausserberg area

== Sport ==
EHC Visp is the city's main team. They play in the Swiss League and their home arena is the Lonza Arena. Most of their home games are played in front of a sell out crowd of 5,125.

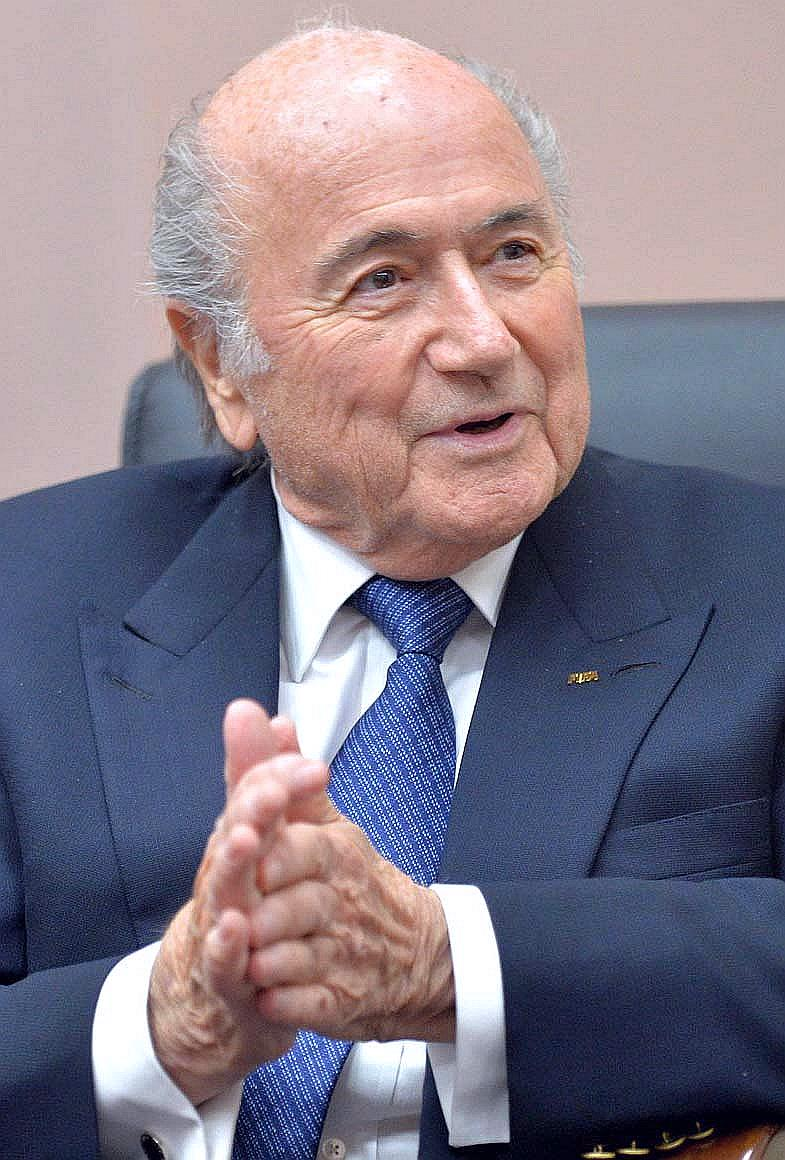
Sepp Blatter, 2015

== Notable people ==
- Joseph Anton Blatter (1745–1807), Prince-bishop of the Diocese of Sion
- Carl Zuckmayer (1896–1977 in Visp), German writer and playwright
- Willi Boskovsky (1909–1991 in Visp), Austrian violinist and conductor, conductor of the Vienna New Year's Concert
- Sigmund Widmer (1919–2003 in Visp), Swiss historian, writer and Mayor of the city of Zürich.
- Sepp Blatter (born 1936 in Visp), Swiss football administrator, eighth President of FIFA from 1998 to 2015
- Walter Salzmann (1936 in Visp – 2012), ice hockey player and coach, competed at the 1964 Winter Olympics
- Pierre Imhasly (born 1939 in Visp – 2017), Swiss novelist and poet
- Aldo Zenhäusern (1951 in Visp – 2012), Swiss ice hockey player, competed at the 1976 Winter Olympics
- Andreas Schaerer (born 1976), Swiss jazz vocalist and composer
- Stefanie Heinzmann (born 1989 in Visp), Swiss pop singer and TV personality, winner of Castingshow SSDSDSSWEMUGABRTLAD
- Dominique Gisin (born 1985 in Visp), retired World Cup alpine ski racer and Olympic gold medalist at the 2014 Winter Olympics

== Climate ==
Visp features a warm-summer humid continental climate (Dfb) according to the Köppen climate classification. Precipitation is lower than in other parts of Switzerland due to its location inside the high mountain ranges of the western Alps, which shields it from the precipitation falling both south and north of the Alps.

Climate data for Visp, elevation 639 m (2,096 ft), (1991–2020)
Month	Jan	Feb	Mar	Apr	May	Jun	Jul	Aug	Sep	Oct	Nov	Dec	Year
Mean daily maximum °C (°F)	3.2 (37.8)	6.7 (44.1)	13.1 (55.6)	17.0 (62.6)	21.3 (70.3)	25.1 (77.2)	27.1 (80.8)	26.3 (79.3)	21.8 (71.2)	16.3 (61.3)	8.7 (47.7)	3.3 (37.9)	15.8 (60.4)
Daily mean °C (°F)	−0.7 (30.7)	1.4 (34.5)	6.6 (43.9)	10.5 (50.9)	14.5 (58.1)	18.1 (64.6)	19.8 (67.6)	19.1 (66.4)	15.0 (59.0)	10.2 (50.4)	4.2 (39.6)	−0.2 (31.6)	9.9 (49.8)
Mean daily minimum °C (°F)	−4.9 (23.2)	−3.5 (25.7)	0.3 (32.5)	3.5 (38.3)	7.4 (45.3)	10.9 (51.6)	12.4 (54.3)	12.1 (53.8)	8.6 (47.5)	4.5 (40.1)	−0.3 (31.5)	−4.0 (24.8)	3.9 (39.0)
Average precipitation mm (inches)	56.6 (2.23)	38.8 (1.53)	43.1 (1.70)	40.4 (1.59)	56.5 (2.22)	43.8 (1.72)	47.2 (1.86)	49.7 (1.96)	36.3 (1.43)	51.6 (2.03)	61.3 (2.41)	65.2 (2.57)	590.5 (23.25)
Average snowfall cm (inches)	31.1 (12.2)	20.0 (7.9)	5.3 (2.1)	3.2 (1.3)	0.0 (0.0)	0.0 (0.0)	0.0 (0.0)	0.0 (0.0)	0.0 (0.0)	0.0 (0.0)	5.3 (2.1)	21.5 (8.5)	86.4 (34.1)
Average precipitation days (≥ 1.0 mm)	6.9	5.2	5.8	5.4	7.4	7.4	7.1	7.7	5.9	6.7	7.4	7.5	80.4
Average snowy days (≥ 1.0 cm)	5.3	3.9	1.2	0.4	0.0	0.1	0.0	0.0	0.1	1.5	1.7	4.3	18.5
Average relative humidity (%)	78	70	60	57	61	62	63	67	70	73	76	81	68
Source 1: NOAA
Source 2: MeteoSwiss (snow 1981–2010)
