= Walter Salzmann =

Swiss ice hockey player

- Born: 13 May 1936; Visp, Switzerland
- Died: 12 September 2012 (aged 76); Brig-Glis, Switzerland
- Height: 6 ft 1 in (185 cm)
- Weight: 198 lb (90 kg; 14 st 2 lb)
- Position: Forward
- NLA team: EHC Visp
- National team: Switzerland
- Playing career: 1964–1964

Walter Salzmann (13 May 1936 - 12 September 2012) was a Swiss professional ice hockey forward who played for EHC Visp in the National League A. He also represented the Swiss national team at the 1964 Winter Olympics.
