= Battle of Marignano =

1515 battle of the War of the League of Cambrai

Coordinates: 45°22′N 9°19′E

- Part of the War of the League of Cambrai
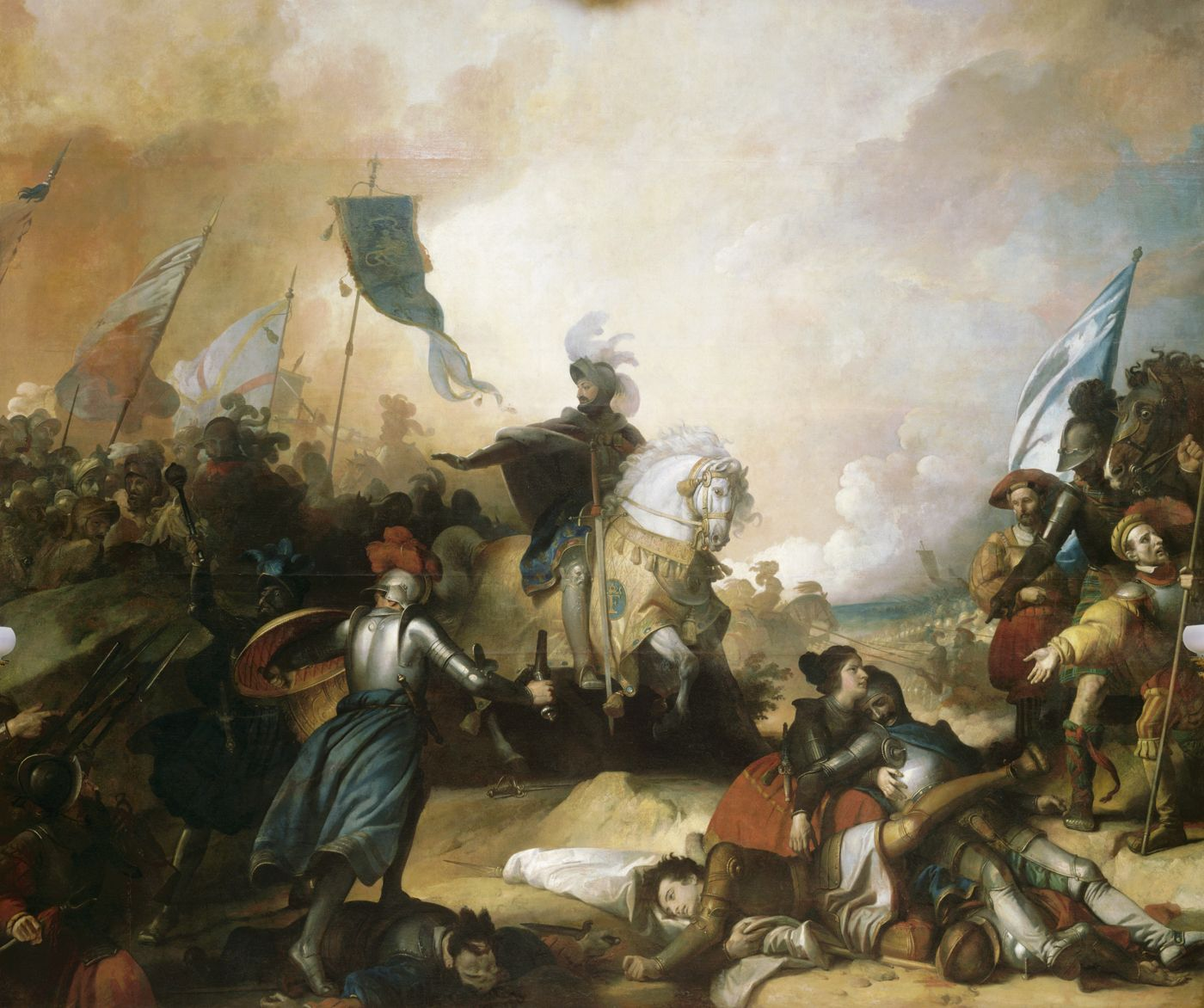
- Francis I Orders His Troops to Stop Pursuing the Swiss; Alexandre-Évariste Fragonard
Date	13–14 September 1515
Location	Near Melegnano, southeast of Milan, present-day Italy
Result	Franco-Venetian victory: Swiss cantons signed the Treaty of Fribourg establishing the "Perpetual Peace"
Territorial changes	France occupies Milan

Belligerents
Kingdom of France; Venice	Old Swiss Confederacy; Milan

Commanders and leaders
Francis I Gian Giacomo Trivulzio; Bartolomeo d'Alviano; Louis de la Trémoille; Charles III, Duke of Bourbon; Charles IV, Duke of Alençon	Marx Röist; Maximilian Sforza; Cardinal Mattheus Schiner

Strength
French: 30,000 men and 72 guns; Venetian reinforcements: 10,000 men (very few engaged)	22,000 infantry 200 cavalry

Casualties and losses
5,000 dead	10,000 dead

The Battle of Marignano, (or bataille de Marignan in French) which took place on 13–14 September 1515, near the town now called Melegnano, 16 km southeast of Milan, was the last major engagement of the War of the League of Cambrai. It pitted the French army, led by Francis I, newly crowned King of France, against the Old Swiss Confederacy. With the French were German landsknechts, and their late-arriving Venetian allies.

The battle resulted in a decisive French victory and the signing of the Treaty of Fribourg, known as the "Perpetual Peace" (Ewiger Frieden, Paix perpétuelle).

== Background ==
The campaign of Marignano followed years of Swiss successes, during which French fortunes in northern Italy had suffered greatly. The Swiss had taken control of Milan (for France the gateway to Italy) after their victory at the Battle of Novara (1513), and returned to its ducal throne Maximilian Sforza, son of Ludovico Sforza, to make Milan a protectorate of Switzerland.

The prologue to the battle was an Alpine passage, in which Francis hauled pieces of artillery (72 huge cannons) over new-made roads over the Col d'Argentière, a previously unknown route. At Villafranca the French, led by Jacques de la Palice, surprised and captured the Papal commander, Prospero Colonna, in a daring cavalry raid deep behind the allied lines (the Chevalier Bayard providing the impetus and expertise). Colonna and his staff aside, the French seized a great deal of booty on the raid, including 600 horses.

The capture of Colonna, along with the startling appearance of the French army on the plains of Piedmont, stunned the allies. The Pope and the Swiss both sought terms with Francis, while the Spanish allies en route from Naples halted to await developments. The main Swiss army retreated to Milan, while a large faction, tired of the war and eager to return home with the booty of years of successful campaigning, urged terms with the French.

Though the parties reached a peace agreement that gave Milan back to the French, leading large portions of the Swiss army to return home, fresh troops also arrived from the Swiss cantons who refused to abide by the treaty. Discord swept through the Swiss forces until Matthäus Schiner, cardinal of Sion and an arch-enemy of King Francis, tricked the Swiss into doing battle with a far superior force by exaggerating the extent of a minor skirmish. The Swiss issued forth from Milan in disciplined columns, numbering around 22,000.

== Battle ==
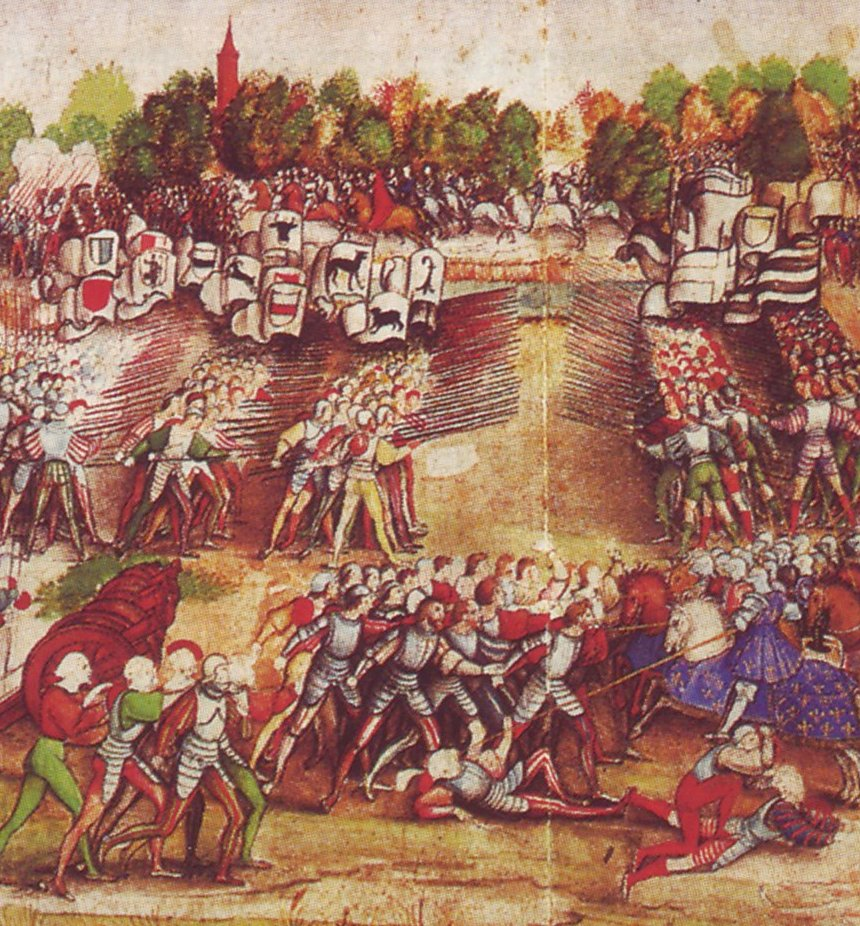
Swiss mercenaries and German Landsknechts fighting for glory, fame, and money at Marignano (1515). The bulk of the Renaissance armies was composed of mercenaries.

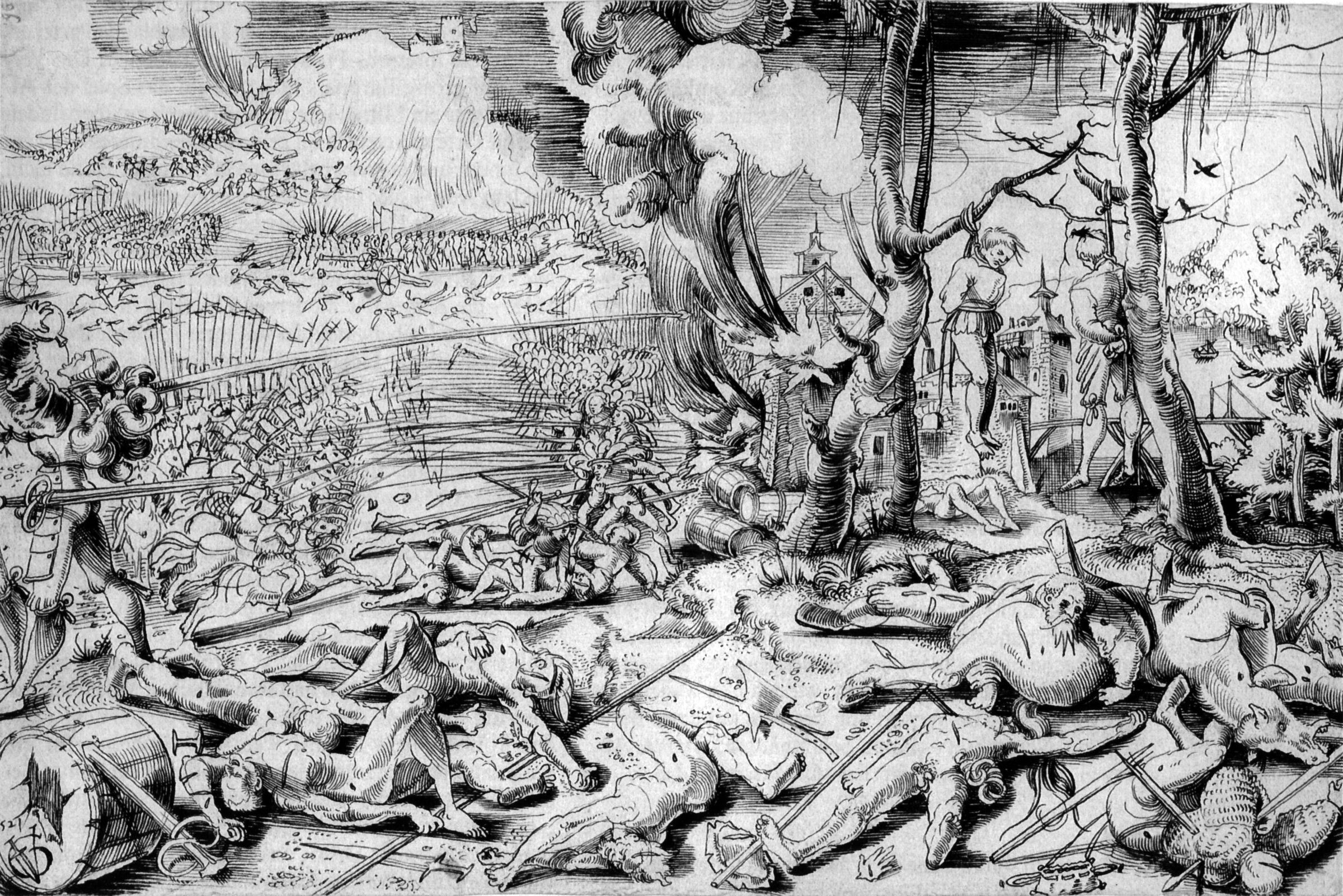
The battlefield of Marignano, drawing by Urs Graf, himself a Swiss mercenary who may have fought there.

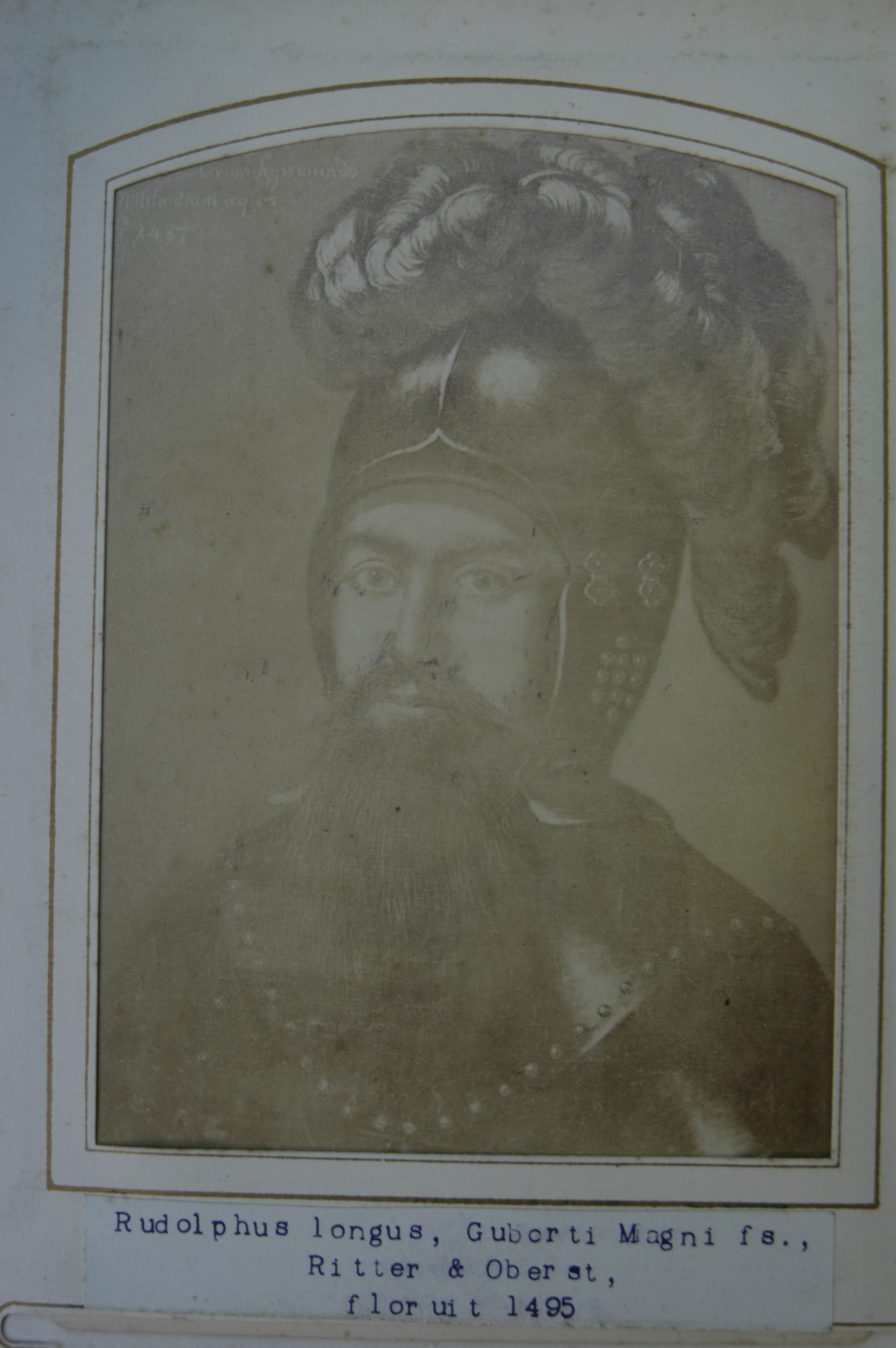
Rudolfus Longus à Salis, of Soglio, sometime Governor of Pavia, killed at Marignano 1515.

The Swiss encountered Francis's forces at the little burnt-out village of Marignano on a plain dotted with vineyards, farm fields, small orchards, and pastures. A treaty signed, the French were not expecting battle. Francis was in his tent, trying on a new suit of armor, when scouts reported the coming of the Swiss. The French army quickly sprang into action, forming up in three divisions. The French vanguard, under the joint command of Charles III, Duke of Bourbon and the Marshal Gian Giacomo Trivulzio, took possession of two shallow rises near San Giuliano. This formation consisted of crossbowmen (protected by earthworks and pavise shields) on the left, a large square of Landsknecht infantry at the center, and arquebusiers on the right, covering the artillery, which was arrayed in a crescent shape along the south-eastern and eastern edges of the formation. Two kilometers to their rear, Francis I of France personally led a force of cavalry and 6,000 Landsknechts recruited from the Netherlands known as the Black Band of Gueldern. Finally, the rearguard, a further kilometer to the center's rear, was led by the King's brother-in-law, Charles IV, Duke of Alençon. Unlike the French force, which had a good mix of pikemen, arquebuses, and cavalry, the Swiss force consisted almost entirely of pike infantry and only fielded less than a dozen artillery pieces.

Close to sunset, the Swiss approached the French in three divisions of their own, each a dense mass of pikemen. They had no artillery or cavalry, and had learned in past actions that a rapid advance into the enemy would sweep all before them. At Marignano, the battle began with a “forlorn hope” detaching from the Swiss vanguard phalanx, and charging the grand battery in front of the King’s position in the center with lowered pikes. Their intent, justified by experience in other battles, was to quickly overrun the French cannon and then turn them upon their owners.

At first the Swiss attack succeeded in driving back the landsknecht defenders and capturing a few of the guns, the speed of the Swiss advance rendering their fire ineffective. But Bourbon’s cavalry from the French right counter-attacked their flank, driving the forlorn hope back to the shelter of the Swiss vanguard. The pursuing French horse were themselves forced to retreat back a full kilometer after taking heavy losses.

Smoke and the coming of night obscured the battle; in the moonlight and confusion, the outcome hung in the balance. Furious French cavalry charges, often led by the king himself, with Bayard at his side, succeeded time and again in throwing back temporary Swiss gains. Many of the foremost French commanders were wounded or killed in the desperate night fighting, including the Prince of Tallemont, son of Louis II de la Trémoille, who died with sixty-two wounds on his body. The Black Legion counter-attacked and threw back the Swiss, only to be repulsed in turn. Bayard had to cut his way through the Swiss phalanx to rescue the Duke of Lorraine, stranded in the dark amongst his enemies. In the darkest hours, the fighting stopped, and both armies extracted themselves and reorganized. During the night, some of the Swiss soldiers, and even entire units, slipped away from the battlefield rather than fight another day. Those that remained were determined and the battle commenced again the following morning.

In the French center, the grand battery had been reassembled. Opposing them, the Swiss had reformed their largest phalanx. Encouraged by the evening before, the Swiss once again lowered pikes and charged the French guns. This time the grand battery was ready for them. Massed cannon fire tore bloody furrows deep in their ranks, slowing the advance. But the undaunted Swiss continually closed ranks and pushed forward. Again, the defending German landsknechts were driven back; but the massed fire of the guns at point blank range prevented the Swiss from pushing farther forward. Still another French cavalry charge, this time led by Bayard, forced the attacking Swiss to give ground.

Baffled by the artillery but as yet undaunted, the Swiss refocused their assault against Alençon’s left-wing division. After making some headway, this attack too was thrown back. In his report later to his mother, King Francis would boast that “thirty brave charges” were hurled by the French gendarmerie against the stubborn Swiss.

Only the mid-morning arrival of allied Venetian forces commanded by the condottiero Bartolomeo d'Alviano turned the tide against the Swiss. Their attacks repulsed everywhere, their ranks in bloody shambles, they grudgingly gave ground and withdrew by forming a single gigantic open square, maintaining extraordinary discipline in their retreat.

The battle was a decisive victory for Francis. This could be considered the expected outcome, seeing as the Swiss were heavily outnumbered and outgunned. But the Swiss during the preceding decades had almost habitually emerged victorious from such disadvantageous situations, and the French victory by no means came easily, the battle hanging in the balance until the arrival of the Venetian reinforcements.

The immediate causes of the Swiss defeat were their failure to capture the enemy artillery during the early phase of the battle and the arrival of the Venetians. But also contributing to the Swiss defeat were their lack of discipline and their ineffective command structure. Earlier in the same year of 1515, the Swiss diet had granted to each captain the authority to decide whether their company would continue their campaign or retreat. This made it impossible for the Swiss forces to act as a unit. The system of command consisted of two captains elected as commanders-in-chief, besides the captains of the individual companies, as well as one representative elected by the men-at-arms of each canton. These commanders would vote on the policy of the Swiss army. In practice, this system broke down as soon as it was put to the test: the captains decided to honour the agreement not to attack, while the representatives of the troops, especially those of Uri, Schwyz, and Glarus, decided to attack regardless, motivated by the prospect of rich spoils.

== Results ==
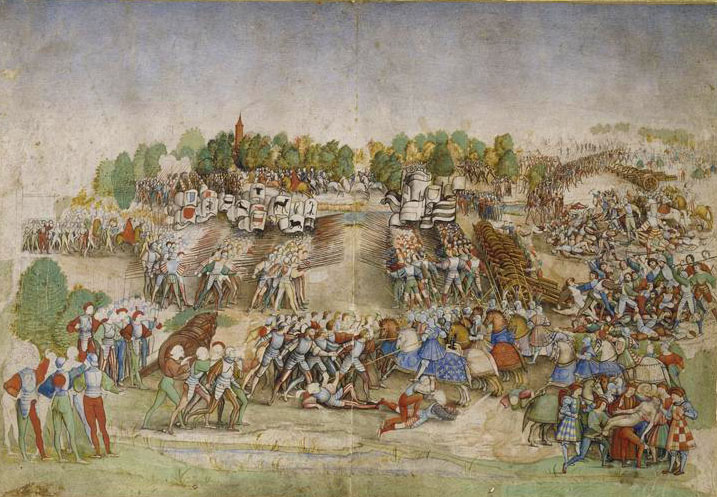
Contemporary depiction of the battle, attributed to the Maître à la Ratière

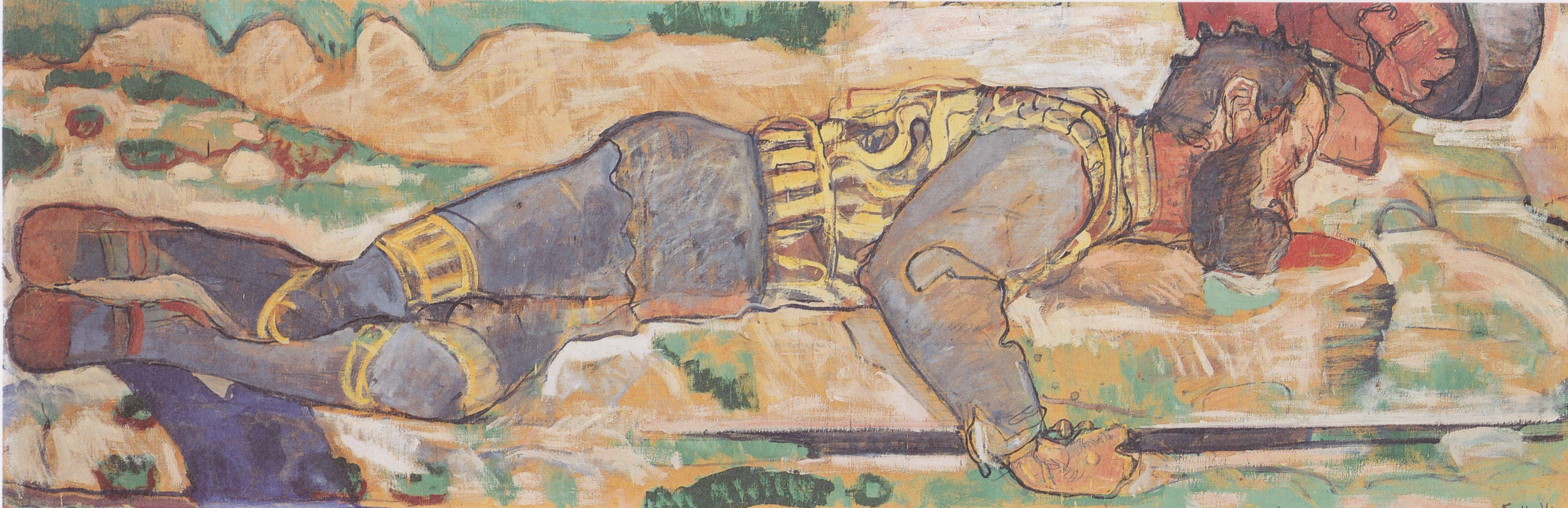
Dying Swiss, sketch by Ferdinand Hodler (ca. 1898) for his Retreat from Marignano fresco (1900).

=== French side ===
“I have vanquished those whom only Caesar vanquished” was printed on the medal King Francis ordered struck to commemorate the victory. Considering the battle his most cherished triumph, Francis requested that he be knighted on the battlefield, in the ancient style, by the Chevalier Bayard. Marshal Gian Giacomo Trivulzio, veteran of every war for the previous 40 years, praised Marignano as the “battle of giants” and stated that compared to it, all previous battles in his lifetime had been “child’s sport”.

French success at Marignano, however, eventually galvanized opposition in the divided peninsula and turned the European balance of power against Francis I. In the meantime, however, Francis gained the city of Milan, and more importantly, the Castello Sforzesco within it, the strategic key to control of Lombardy. There Maximilian Sforza and his Swiss mercenaries and the cardinal-bishop of Sion retreated, only submitting when French sappers had placed mines under the foundations. The French regained Milan, and Maximilian went into luxurious exile with a French purse of 100,000 écus.

=== Swiss side ===
The retreating Swiss army retained control of their upper-Lombardy provinces of Bellinzona and adjacent valleys, leaving a rearguard to preside over them.

The battle ended all Swiss aspirations in Milan; never again did the Swiss Confederacy fight against France or Milan. The Confederacy did not go to war against anyone after 1525, and (apart from the conquest of Vaud by the canton of Bern acting on its own in 1536) there was never another Swiss military offensive against an external enemy. Swiss historiography has tended to attribute this to the "lesson learned" at Marignano, but at least as effective was the division created by the Swiss Reformation in the 1520s, dividing the Confederacy into two factions which would be occupied with internal hostilities throughout the period of the European Wars of Religion, as well as a number of painful defeats of Swiss mercenary regiments in the decade between 1515 and 1525 (at Bicocca, Sesia and Pavia).

=== Perpetual Peace ===
After lengthy negotiations, a peace treaty between the Thirteen Cantons and their allies (abbot and city of St. Gallen, Three Leagues, Valais, Mulhouse) on one hand and Francis as both King of France and Duke of Milan on the other was signed in Fribourg on 29 November 1516. In the treaty of Fribourg, known as "Perpetual Peace" (Ewiger Frieden, Paix perpétuelle), the Swiss Confederacy renounced all claims to the protectorate of Milan. In return, France paid 700,000 gold crowns in compensation to the Confederacy. Both parties agreed to abstain from giving any support to enemies of the other party (with the exception of pre-existing treaties) and agreed on an arrangement of arbitration in the case of future disputes. France offered another 300,000 crowns if the Swiss were willing to yield their transmontane territories (except for Bellinzona), but this offer was declined. The treaty furthermore granted trade privileges to the Swiss, both in Milan and in Lyon. Only the Ossola valley was passed back to Milan, while the other transmontane bailiwicks of the Swiss Confederacy remain part of Switzerland to this day, since 1803 as the canton Ticino (while the Three Leagues lost control of the Valtellina in 1797).

The "Perpetual Peace" with France was indeed kept for the remainder of the lifetime of the Kingdom of France, and was broken only during the French Revolutionary Wars, when the French Republic invaded Switzerland in 1798. It opened a period of close ties between the Swiss Confederacy with France over the next three centuries (while at the same time Switzerland moved away from its association with the Holy Roman Empire). A next step of rapprochement to France was the service pact (Soldbündnis) with France, concluded in 1521, which made Swiss mercenary regiments a regular part of the French armed forces (see Gardes Suisses). This arrangement also outlasted three centuries, with four Swiss regiments participating in Napoleon's invasion of Russia in 1812, foreign military service of Swiss citizens being finally outlawed in 1848 with the formation of Switzerland as a federal state.

=== Other ===
On 11 December 1515, Francis met with Pope Leo X in Bologna. After several lengthy conversations, it was agreed that Francis would renounce the Pragmatic Sanction of Bourges, and the pope would accept Francis' demands in the matter of the selection of French bishops. The terms of a concordat between France and the Papacy were negotiated by plenipotentiaries over the following six weeks, granting the king of France, among other things, the right to nominate candidates for all vacancies in bishoprics or abbeys, subject to confirmation by the pope. The Concordat was signed by Pope Leo X on 15 August 1516.

Also at the meeting in Bologna was Leonardo da Vinci, whom Francis persuaded to accompany him back to France, and granted him the Clos Lucé manor and a pension of 7,000 scudi.

Also present at the battle was Huldrych Zwingli, who since 1506 had been church patron at Glarus. In Glarus, there was political controversy on which side the young men seeking employment as mercenaries should take service, the side of France or that of the Holy Roman Empire and the Papal States. The aim was to prevent that men of Glarus took service on both sides of the war, which would result in the unhappy constellation of "brothers fighting brothers" on the battlefield, as had been the case at Novara in 1500. Zwingli had supported the Pope before Marignano, and even after the battle, he opposed the peace with France and continued to support the side of the Papal States. Since public opinion in Glarus had shifted towards a clearly pro-French stance after the peace of 1516, Zwingli was forced to abandon his position in Glarus. He took employment at Einsiedeln, and from 1519 in Zürich. Based on his experience in the Italian War, Zwingli became an outspoken opponent of mercenary service, arguing with Erasmus of Rotterdam that "war is sweet only to those who have not experienced it" (dulce bellum inexpertis). He also blamed the warmongering on the part of cardinal Schiner for the disaster at Marignano and began to preach against the "red caps" (rote hüetlin, i.e. the high clergy), the first signs of his radicalization that would culminate in the Swiss Reformation during the decade following Marignano.

== Legacy and commemoration ==
La Guerre by Clément Janequin (5:47)

Commemorating the event are a bas-relief of the Battle of Marignano by Pierre Bontemps, which decorates Francis I's tomb at Saint-Denis; a painting by Antoine Caron for Fontainebleau (now at the National Gallery of Canada, Ottawa); and a famous musical composition of Clément Janequin, the programmatic chanson La guerre. The Swiss hero Hans Bär appears in a fresco on the tower of the Basel City Hall. The march Marignan (Marignano in the French language), composed in 1939 by Jean Daetwyler, is the official orchestral hymn of the Swiss canton Valais.

== See also ==
- Treaty of Fribourg (1516)

== Sources ==
- Bradford, Alfred S. (2014). War: Antiquity and Its Legacy Ancients and moderns series. I.B.Tauris. ISBN 9781848859357.
- Burnett, Amy Nelson (2016). A Companion to the Swiss Reformation. Brill. ISBN 978-9004301023.
- Costigan, Richard F. (1966). "State Appointment of Bishops". Journal of Church and State. 8 (1, Winter): 82–96. doi:10.1093/jcs/8.1.82.
- Knecht, R.J. (1984). Francis I. Cambridge University Press. ISBN 0 521 27887 2.
- Mallett, Michael E. (1994). "The Art of War". In Brady, Thomas A.; Oberman, Heiko A.; Tracy, James D. (eds.). Handbook of European History 1400-1600: Late Middle Ages, Renaissance and Reformation. Vol. I: Structures and Assertions. Brill. pp. 535–562. ISBN 9789004391659.
- Mallett, Michael; Shaw, Christine (2012). The Italian Wars, 1494-1559. Pearson Education Limited. ISBN 978-0-582-05758-6.
- McGrath, Alister E. (2012). Reformation Thought: An Introduction. Wiley. ISBN 9780470672839.
- Pooler, Richard Shaw (2020). Leonardo Da Vinci's Treatise of Painting: The Story of The World's Greatest Treatise on Painting. Vernon Press. ISBN 978-1-62273-017-9.
- Hervé de Weck: "Marignan, bataille de" in German, French and Italian in the online Historical Dictionary of Switzerland, 2015.
- "Marignan, Battle of" . Encyclopædia Britannica. Vol. 17 (11th ed.). 1911. pp. 716–717.
- W. McAllister Johnson, "The Monumental Style of Fontainebleau and its Consequences: Antoine Caron and 'The Submission of Milan'" from National Gallery of Canada Bulletin 26 (1975)
