= Pierre Imhasly =

Swiss novelist and poet

Pierre Imhalsy (14 November 1939 – 17 June 2017) was a Swiss novelist and poet.

Imhasly was born in Visp, Switzerland. He studied German literature in Fribourg and Zurich. His major work is The Rhone Saga an epic poem about the Rhône River. Imhasly was the principal translator of Maurice Chappaz's works. Imhasly died of cancer on 17 June 2017.

== Works ==
- Maithuna: Liebesakt transzendierend - Matterhorn: Berg der Welt. Frankfurt am Main; Basel: Stroemfeld-Verlag, 2005.
- Blick auf ... Zermatt. Ayer: Editions Porte-plumes, 2004.
- Leni, Nomadin. Frankfurt am Main; Basel: Stroemfeld Verlag, 2001.
- Widerpart oder Fuga mit Orgelpunkt vom Schnee: Ein Poem. Frankfurt am Main; Basel: Stroemfeld-Verlag, 2000.
- Paraiso si. Frankfurt am Main; Basel: Stroemfeld-Verlag, 2000.
- Rhone Saga. Basel: Stroemfeld, 1996.
- Alfons Studer oder ein Eros in allen Dingen. Bern: Erpf, 1984.
- Corrida: der spanische Stier und sein Fest. Bern: Erpf, 1982.
- Widerpart oder Fuga mit Orgelpunkt vom Schnee: Ein Poem. Zürich [etc.]: Suhrkamp, 1979.
- Widerpart oder Fuga mit Orgelpunkt vom Schnee. Zürich: Editio Princeps [E. Ammann], 1977.
- Armin: Visp. Variationen & Etüden. Brig: Rotten-Verlag, 1976.
- Heremence Beton = Heremence beton. Lausanne: Editions du Gran-Pont, 1974.
- Sellerie, Ketch up & Megatonnen: Eine Textsammlung. Bern: Kandelaber-Verlag, 1970.
