= Maximilian Sforza =

Duke of Milan from 1512 to 1515

Massimiliano Sforza
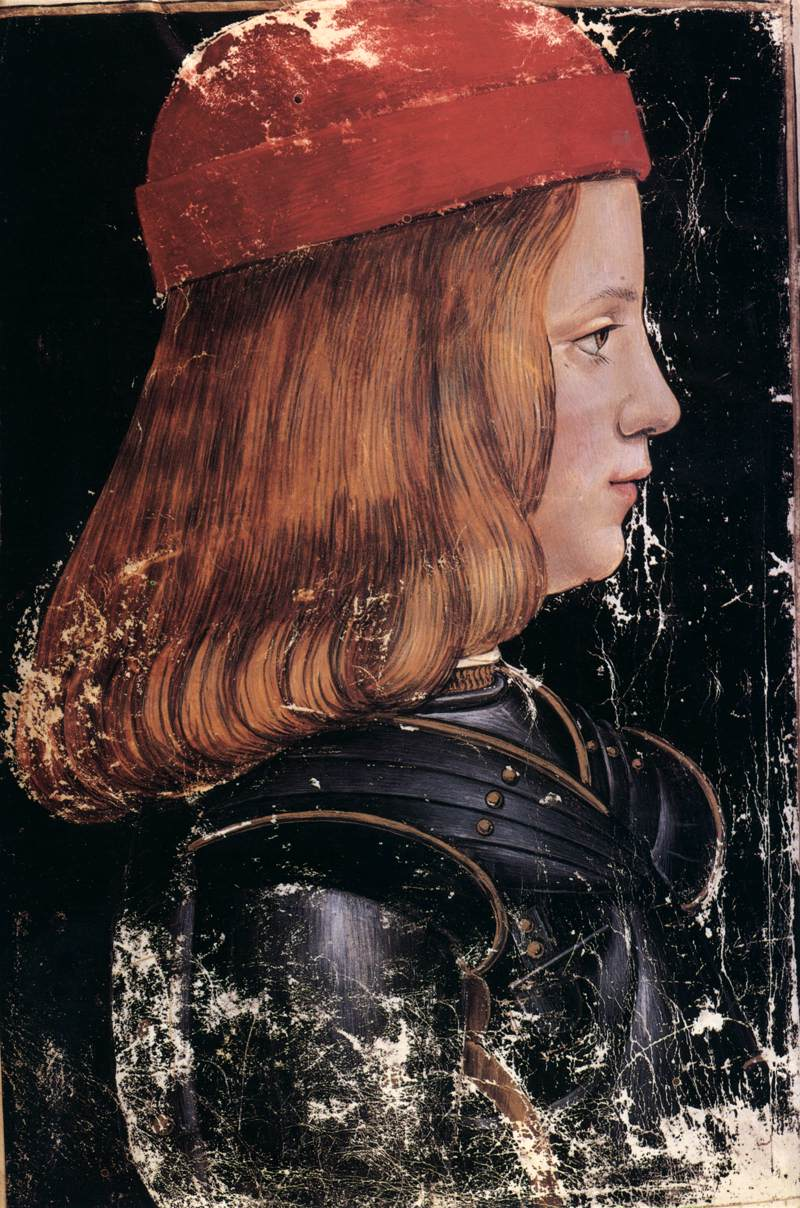
- Portrait by Giovanni Ambrogio de Predis, c. 1496–99

Duke of Milan
- Reign: 16 June 1512 – 11 October 1515
- Predecessor: Louis XII of France
- Successor: Francis I of France
- Born: Ercole Massimiliano Sforza; 25 January 1493; Milan, Duchy of Milan
- Died: 4 June 1530 (aged 37); Fontainebleau, France
- House: Sforza
- Father: Ludovico Sforza
- Mother: Beatrice d'Este

Maximilian Maria Sforza (Italian: Massimiliano Maria Sforza; 25 January 1493 – 25 May 1530) was a Duke of Milan from the Sforza family, the son of Ludovico Sforza.

== Biography ==
When Maximilian was three his father tried to arrange a marriage between him and Mary Tudor, the younger daughter of King Henry VII of England. However, Henry VII rejected the proposal citing Mary's young age as the issue.

He was installed as a ruler of Milan in 1512 after the capture of Milan by the Holy League, supported by a Swiss militia led by Jakob Meyer zum Hasen. He ruled from 1512 to 1515, between the occupations of Louis XII of France (1500–1512), and Francis I of France in 1515. Francis I claimed the title of Duke of Milan, as he was descended from Louis I of Orléans and Valentina Visconti who were his great-grandparents. His claims were twofold because he married Claude, the daughter of Louis XII, who was also the great-granddaughter of Louis of Orléans and Valentina.

After the French victory at the Battle of Marignano the arrival of the Venetians, under the command of Bartolomeo d'Alviano, transformed these indecisive battles into a terrible defeat for Matthew Schiner and his Swiss troops who lost 14,000 men. The survivors returned home to Switzerland, taking along the Duke's young brother, Francesco II Sforza, who went to reside in Innsbruck under the guard of Emperor Maximilian I.

The French entered Milan on 17 September 1515 and Maximilian surrendered 17 days later on 4 October. Francis I entered his new duchy on 11 October, accompanied by Charles III, Duke of Savoy and William IX, Marquis of Montferrat who had pledged allegiance to him. The capitulation was complete and Maximilian was imprisoned by the returning French troops, being paid 100,000 écus for his duchy.

== Ancestors ==
Ancestors of Maximilian Sforza

8. Muzio Attendolo Sforza
4. Francesco I Sforza
9. Lucia da Torsciano
2. Ludovico Sforza
10. Filippo Maria Visconti
5. Bianca Maria Visconti
11. Agnese del Maino
1. Massimiliano Sforza
12. Niccolò III d'Este, Marquis of Ferrara
6. Ercole I d'Este, Duke of Ferrara
13. Ricciarda of Saluzzo
3. Beatrice d'Este
14. Ferdinand I of Naples
7. Eleanor of Naples
15. Isabella of Clermont

== Sources ==
- Alexander, J. J. G. (1978). Italian Renaissance Illuminations. Chatto & Windus.
- Jansen, Sharon L. (2002). The Monstrous Regiment of Women: Female Rulers in Early Modern Europe. Palgrave Macmillan.
- Knecht, R.J. (1984). Francis I. Cambridge University Press. ISBN 0 521 27887 2.
- Sadlack, Erin A. (2011). The French Queen's Letters: Mary Tudor Brandon and the Politics of Marriage in Sixteenth-Century Europe. Palgrave Macmillan.

Italian nobility
Preceded by Louis XII of France	Duke of Milan; 1512–1515	Succeeded by Francis I of France
