= Diocese of Sion =

Catholic diocese in Switzerland

Coordinates: 46.2339°N 7.3589°E

Diocese of Sion Dioecesis Sedunensis Bistum Sitten (German) Diocèse de Sion (French)

Catholic
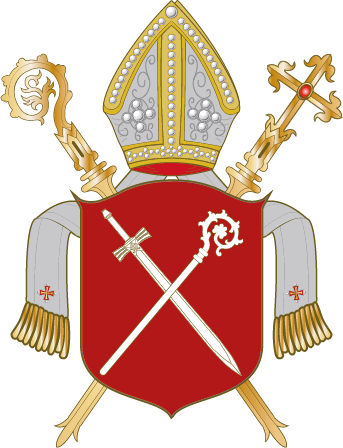
- Coat of arms

Location
- Metropolitan: Immediately subject to the Holy See

Statistics
- Area: 5,589 km^{2} (2,158 sq mi)
- Population: Total; Catholics: (as of 2020); 358,213; 260,971 (72.9%)
- Parishes: 157

Information
- Denomination: Catholic
- Sui iuris church: Latin Church
- Rite: Roman Rite
- Established: 4th century
- Cathedral: Cathédrale Notre-Dame du Glarier

Current leadership
- Pope: Leo XIV
- Bishop: Jean-Marie Lovey
- Bishops emeritus: Norbert Brunner

Map
- Map of the modern diocese of Sion within Switzerland

Website
- Website of the Diocese

The Diocese of Sion (Latin: Dioecesis Sedunensis, French: Diocèse de Sion, German: Bistum Sitten) is a Latin Catholic ecclesiastical territory in the canton of Valais, Switzerland. It is the oldest bishopric in the country and one of the oldest north of the Alps. The history of the Bishops of Sion, of the Abbey of St. Maurice, and of Valais as a whole are inextricably intertwined.

== History ==
=== Early history ===
The see was established at Octodurum, now called Martigny, the capital of the Roman province of Alpes Poeninae. The first authentically historical bishop was Saint Theodore/Theodolus (died in 391), who was present at the Council of Aquileia in 381. He founded the Abbey of Saint-Maurice, with a small church in honor of Saint Maurice, martyred there c. 300, when he united the local hermits in a common life, thus beginning the Abbey of Saint-Maurice, the oldest north of the Alps. Theodore rebuilt the church at Sion, which had been destroyed by Emperor Maximinus at the beginning of the 4th century. At first the new diocese was a suffragan of the archdiocese of Vienne; later it became suffragan of Tarentaise.

In 589 the bishop, St. Heliodorus, transferred the see to Sion, leaving the low-lying, flood-prone site of Octodurum, where the Drance joins the Rhone. Though frequently the early bishops were also abbots of Saint-Maurice, the monastic community was jealously watchful that the bishops should not extend their jurisdiction over the abbey. Several of the bishops united both offices: Wilcharius (764-780), previously Archbishop of Vienne, whence he had been driven by the Moors; St. Alteus, who received from the pope a bull of exemption in favor of the monastery (780); Aimo II, son of Count Humbert I of Savoy, who entertained Leo IX at Saint-Maurice in 1049.

=== Prince-bishops ===
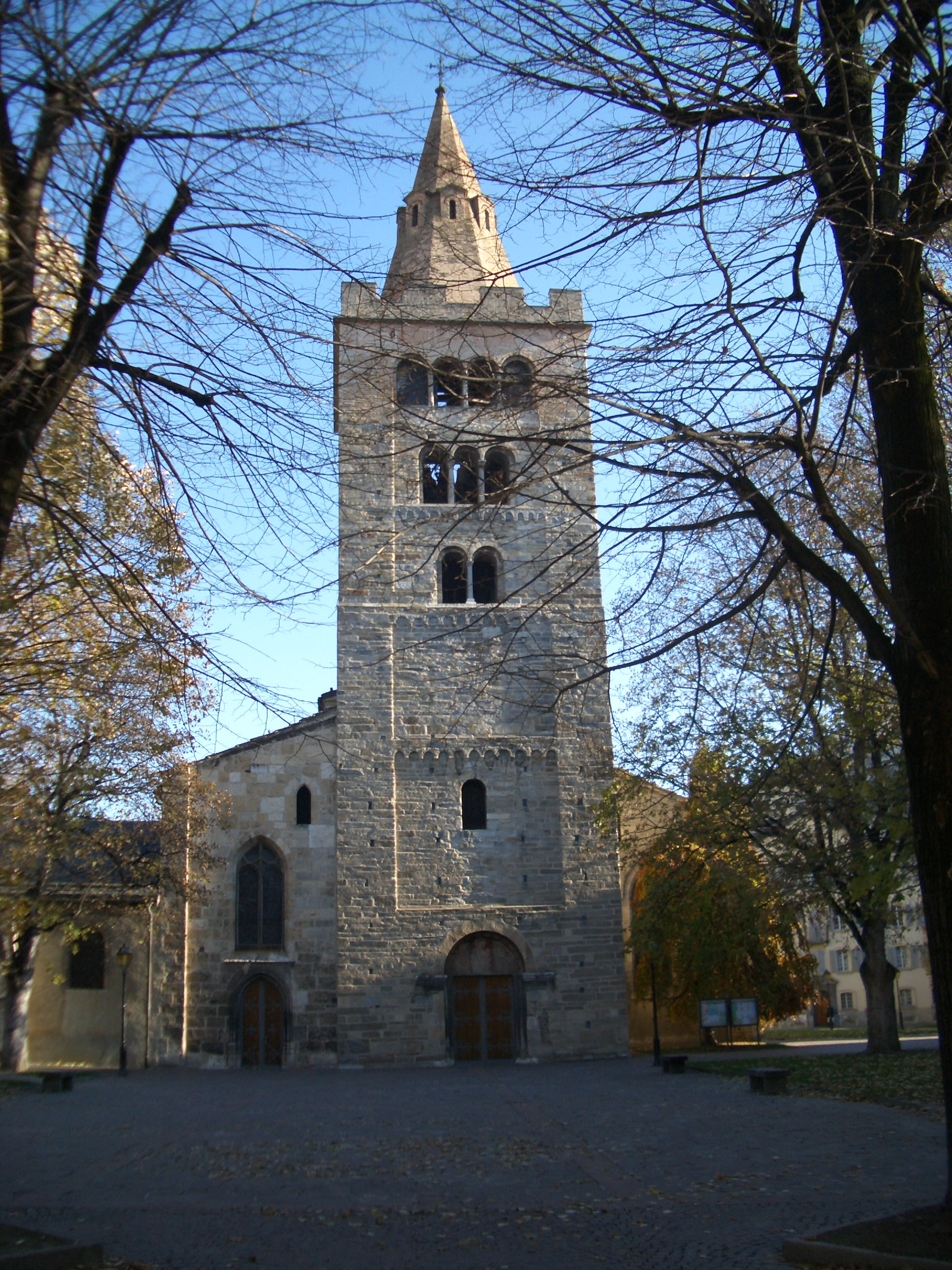
The Cathedral of Notre Dame du Glarier

About 999, the last king of Upper Burgundy, Rudolph IV, granted the Countship of Valais to Bishop Hugo (998-1017); this union of the spiritual and secular powers made the prince-bishop the most powerful ruler in the valley of the Upper Rhone, the region called the Valais. Taking this donation as a basis, the bishops of Sion extended their secular power, and the religious metropolis of the valley became also the political center. However, the union of the two powers was the cause of violent disputes in the following centuries. For, while the spiritual jurisdiction of the bishop, as Bishop of Sion, extended over the whole valley of the Rhone above Lake Geneva, the Countship of Valais included only the upper part of the valley, reaching to the confluence of the Trient and the Rhone. The attempts of the bishops of Sion to carry their secular power farther down the Rhone were bitterly and successfully opposed by the abbots of Saint-Maurice, who had obtained large possessions in Lower Valais.

The medieval bishops of Sion were generally appointed from the younger sons of noble families of Savoy and Valais and often drew the resources of the see into the feuds of these families. Moreover, the bishops were vigorously opposed, as a matter of principle, by the petty feudal nobles of Valais, each in their fortified castle on rocky heights, seeking to evade the supremacy of the bishop who was at the same time count and prefect of the Holy Roman Empire. Especially in the 14th and 15th centuries, the benefactors in these traditional struggles were often the rich peasant communities of Upper Valais, which were called later the Sieben Zehnden (the "seven tithings"), who exacted increasing political rights as the price of support, beginning with the success of the rebellion of 1415–1420. Bishop William IV of Raron (1437-1457) was obliged to relinquish civil and criminal jurisdiction over the sieben Zehnten by the Treaty of Naters in 1446, while a revolt of his subjects compelled Bishop Jost of Silinen (1482-1496) to flee from the diocese. In 1428-1447, the Valais witch trials raged through the area.

The bishops of Sion minted their own money from earliest times, possibly from as early as the Carolingian era, and certainly from the 11th century. In the early 17th century, the Seven Tithings began to mint their own coin, which was vigorously opposed by the bishops until they finally had to cede temporal power to the Republic in 1634.

Sion and the district of the Valais were constantly drawn into wider struggles. Walter II of Supersaxo (1457-1482) had taken part in the battles of the Swiss against Charles the Bold of Burgundy and his ally, the Duke of Savoy, and in 1475 they drove the House of Savoy from Lower Valais. Linked to the Old Swiss Confederacy since the 15th century, the Valais region was for long divided between the French party (typified by Georg of Supersaxo) and the Burgundian-Milanese alliance, to which a powerful personage, Cardinal Matthaeus Schiner (1465-1522), bishop of Sion, had thrown his support. Schiner feared French supremacy enough to place the military force of the diocese at the disposal of the pope and in 1510 brought about an alliance for five years between the Swiss Confederacy and the Roman Church, only to end up as one of the biggest losers in the Swiss defeat at Marignano in 1516, in which the bishop fought himself. In return for his support, Julius II made Schiner a cardinal and in 1513 accepted direct control of the see, which gave the Bishops of Sion much of the authority of an archbishop. The defeat at Marignano and the arbitrary rule of his brothers led to a revolt of Schiner's subjects; in 1519 he was obliged to flee the diocese.

=== Reformation ===
The new doctrines of the Reformation found little acceptance in Valais, although preachers were sent into the canton from Bern, Zürich, and Basel. In 1529 Bishop Adrian I of Riedmatten (1529-1548), the cathedral chapter, and the sieben Zehnten formed an alliance with the Catholic cantons of the Confederation, to maintain and protect the Catholic faith against the efforts of the Reformed cantons. On account of this alliance Valais aided in gaining the victory of the Catholics over the followers of Zwingli at Kappel am Albis in 1531; this victory saved the remaining possessions of the Catholic Church in Switzerland. The abbots of Saint-Maurice opposed all religious innovations as energetically as did Bishops Adrian I of Riedmatten, Hildebrand of Riedmatten (1565-1604), and Adrian II of Riedmatten (1604-1613), so that the whole of Valais remained ostensibly Catholic. Both Adrian II and his successor Hildebrand Jost (1613-1638) were again involved in disputes with the sieben Zehnten in regard to the exercise of the rights of secular supremacy, which were finally settled in 1630, when the Bishops relinquished their territorial rule.

=== Impact of the French Revolution ===
The secular power of the bishops was brought to an end by the French Revolution. In 1798 Valais, after a struggle against the supremacy of France, was incorporated into the Helvetic Republic, and Prince-bishop Joseph Anton Blatter (1745-1807) went into exile in Novara. During the sway of Napoleon the Valais was separated from Switzerland in 1802 as the Rhodanic Republic, and in 1810 was annexed by France.

=== 19th century ===
In 1813 Valais threw off French supremacy, when the Allies entered the territory; in 1814 it joined Switzerland as one of the cantons. As partial compensation for the loss of his secular power, the bishop received a post of honour in the Diet of the canton and the right to four votes. Disputes often arose as the Constitution of 1815 of the canton gave Upper Valais political predominance in the cantonal government, notwithstanding the fact that its population was smaller than that of Lower Valais. This led in 1840 to a civil war with Lower Valais, where the "Young Swiss" party, hostile to the Church, was in control. The party friendly to the Church prevailed, and the influence of the Church over teaching was, at first, preserved, but on account of the defeat of the Sonderbund, with which Valais had united, a radical Government gained control in 1848. The new administration at once showed itself unfriendly to the Church, secularized many church landed properties, and wrung large sums of money from the bishop and monasteries. When in 1856 the moderate party gained the cantonal election, negotiations were begun with Bishop Peter Joseph von Preux (1843-1875), and friendly relations were restored between the diocese and the canton. In 1880 the two powers came to an agreement as to the lands taken from the Church in 1847; these, so far as they had not been sold, were given back for their original uses.

=== Recent history ===
In modern times the bishop and the government have been on friendly terms, under the Constitution of 1907 that, while it declared the Catholic religion to be the religion of the canton, forbade any union of spiritual and secular functions.

== Library of the cathedral chapter ==
The library of Sion is known above all for its 120 medieval codices, dating from the mid-9th century to the late 15th century, some richly illuminated, published by Josef Leisibach and Albert Jörger. The library was in the care of the sacristan of the cathedral chapter of canons. He also was responsible for the security of the treasury. From the 12th century, the chapter was responsible for the Bishop's chancellery and kept the archives; doubtless there was a modest scriptorium. The library was enriched by donations from canons and in the 15th century from bishops: Guillaume VI de Rarogne (1437-1451), Jost de Silenen (1482-1496) and above all Walter Supersaxo (1457-1482) who possessed a rich library of canon law.

== See also ==
- List of Bishops of Sion
- Prince-Bishopric of Basel
- Prince-Bishopric of Chur
- Prince-Bishopric of Lausanne
- Roman Catholic Archdiocese of Vienne
- Duchy of Savoy
- History of the Valais
