= Sion Cathedral =

Cathedral in Sion, Valais, Switzerland

Coordinates: 46.2340°N 7.3594°E

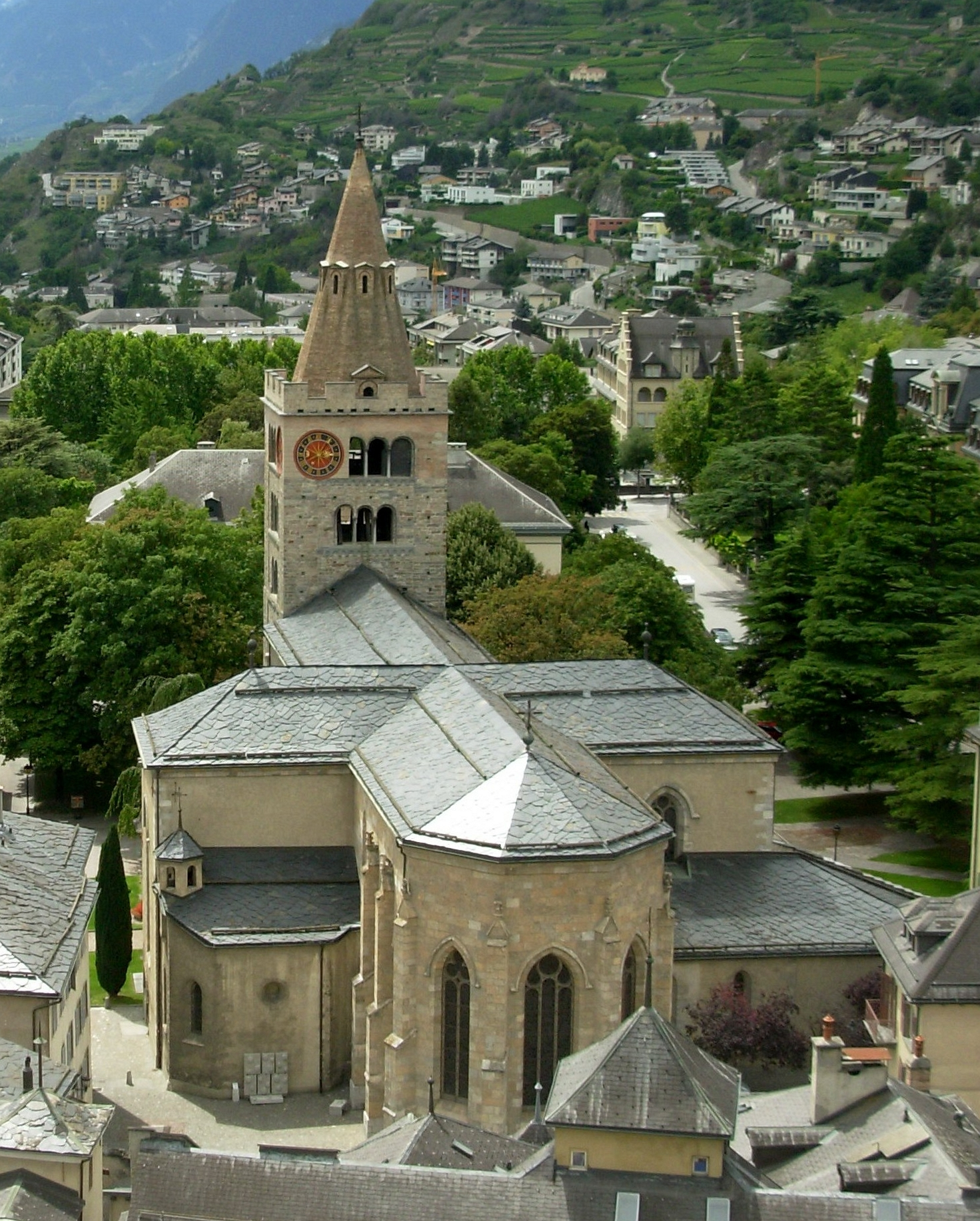
Sion Cathedral

Sion Cathedral or the Cathedral of Our Lady of Sion (French: Cathédrale Notre-Dame de Sion, Cathédrale Notre-Dame du Glarier) is the Roman Catholic cathedral in Sion, Valais, Switzerland. It is the seat of the Diocese of Sion.

The cathedral, in the Byzantine style, contains several Roman inscriptions, 15 altars, and many fonts.
