= Matthäus Schiner =

Bishop of Sion

- Bishop of Sion
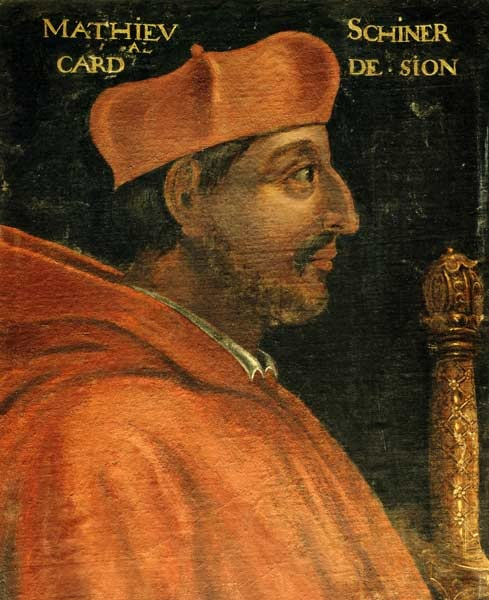
- Painting of Schiner as cardinal (16th century)
- Church: Catholic Church
- Diocese: Diocese of Sion
- In office: 20 September 1498 – 1 October 1522
- Predecessor: Nicolas Schiner
- Successor: Paolo Emilio Cesi
- Other posts: Cardinal-Priest of Santa Pudenziana (1511-1522); Administrator of Catania (1520-1522)
- Previous post: Administrator of Novara (1512-1516)

Orders
- Ordination: 21 April 1489
- Consecration: 13 October 1499
- Created cardinal: 10 March 1511 by Pope Julius II

Personal details
- Born: 1465 Mühlebach (in present-day Ernen), Valais, Holy Roman Empire
- Died: 1 October 1522 (aged 56–57) Rome, Papal States

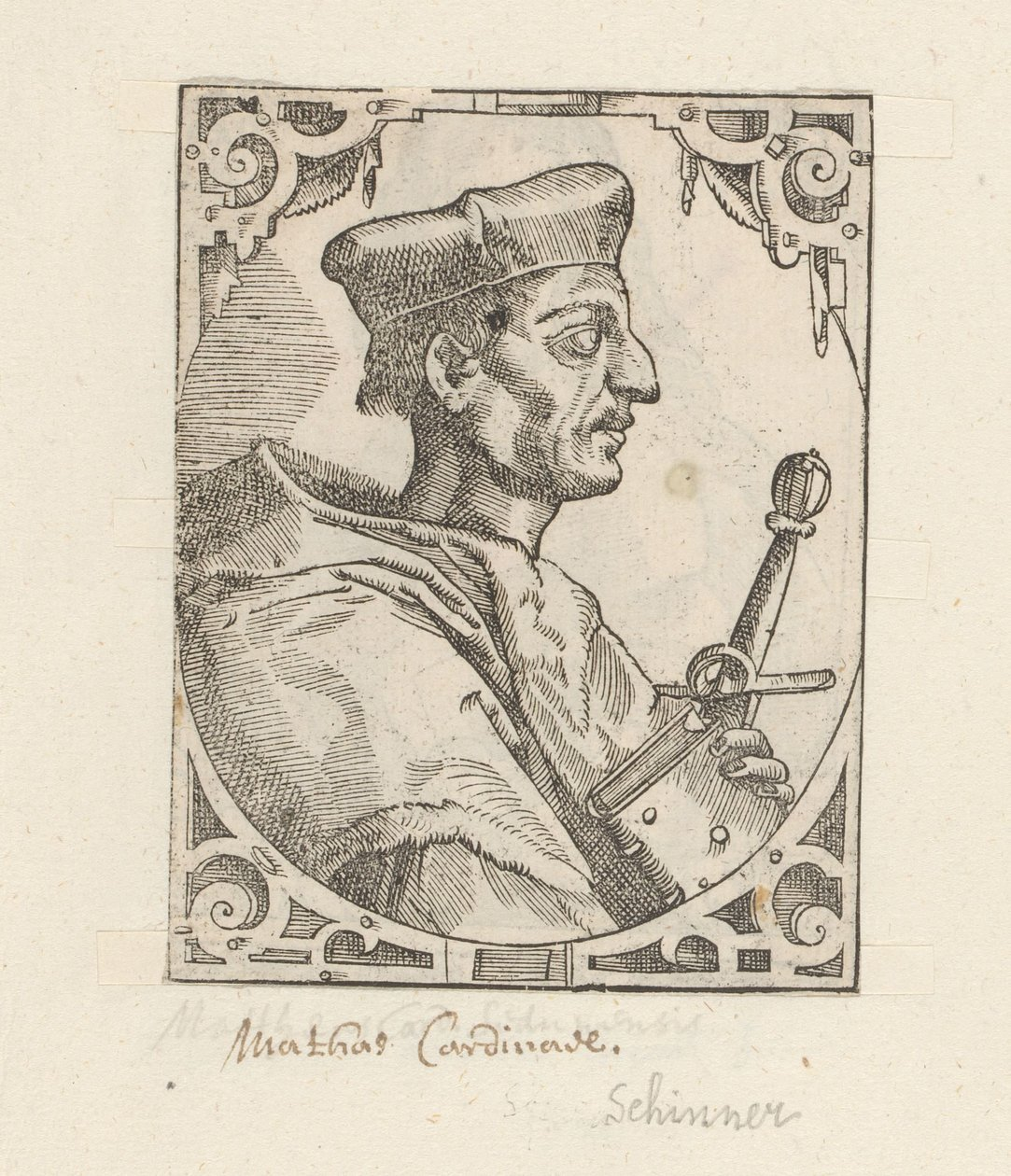
Portrait by Tobias Stimmer

Matthäus Schiner (or Schinner; c. 1465 – 1 October 1522) was a bishop of Sion, Cardinal and diplomat. He was a military commander in several battles in northern Italy.

== Biography ==
He was born in Mühlebach (in what is now the Swiss canton of Valais), the son of the farmer and carpenter Peter Schiner and Anna Welschen; his uncle Nicholas Schiner, later Bishop of Sion (Sitten), gave him his early instruction. He embraced the ecclesiastical career and eventually became parish priest of Aernen (1496), and canon and dean of the cathedral of Sion. When his uncle resigned, he was made Bishop of Sion (20 September 1499). Schinner's diplomatic skill and his influence on the allied Swiss Confederacy made him the right hand of Pope Julius II and Pope Leo X in their efforts to unite Italy and expel the French.

In 1511, as a result of an alliance brought about by Schiner, the Swiss made two unsuccessful campaigns against Milan. As a reward for securing this alliance, he was made Bishop of Novara and also cardinal in 1511. In 1512, as papal legate for Italy and Germany, he was appointed commander of a Swiss and Venetian army, drove the French from Milan and established Maximilian Sforza as duke. However, as Louis XII again captured Milan after the death of Julius II, Schiner once more took the field at the head of the Swiss Confederates, and defeated the French in the battle of Novara (1513). The Duke of Milan rewarded Schiner with the margraviate of Vigevano.

When under Francis I of France the French recrossed the Alps, Schiner led the Swiss troops, part of which had retired, at the unfortunate battle of Marignano (1515). In 1516, he raised another army with the aid of England, but was unable to regain Milan. He now sought to attain his end by an alliance between the pope, the emperor, England, and Spain, for which purpose he went himself in 1516 to London, but the reconciliation of the Swiss Confederacy and the emperor with France made the alliance abortive.

During his long absence from home, the French party there, under his bitter enemy George Supersax, raised a rebellion and drove him from Sion. He lived for several years at Zürich (1517–19), and thenceforth mostly at the court of the emperor. He supported the election of Emperor Charles V in 1519, for which he was made bishop of Catania in Sicily (November 1520). In 1521, he led an army of Swiss Confederates in the imperial campaign against Francis I for the possession of Milan. But for his passionate hatred of France, he would have been elected the successor of Leo X; however, Pope Adrian VI called him to Rome as administrator of the States of the Church. He died there of the plague without having seen his diocese again.

His varied and large scattered correspondence is the only literary work he left. The date of his birth has been disputed, as the statements concerning it differby nearly twenty years. The year is unknown, and all direct indications are lacking. We know, however, that he attended the School of Lupulus at Bern, which was not opened until 1493. As Schiner was a priest in 1492, the year of his birth could not be later than 1470.
