= Supersaxo =

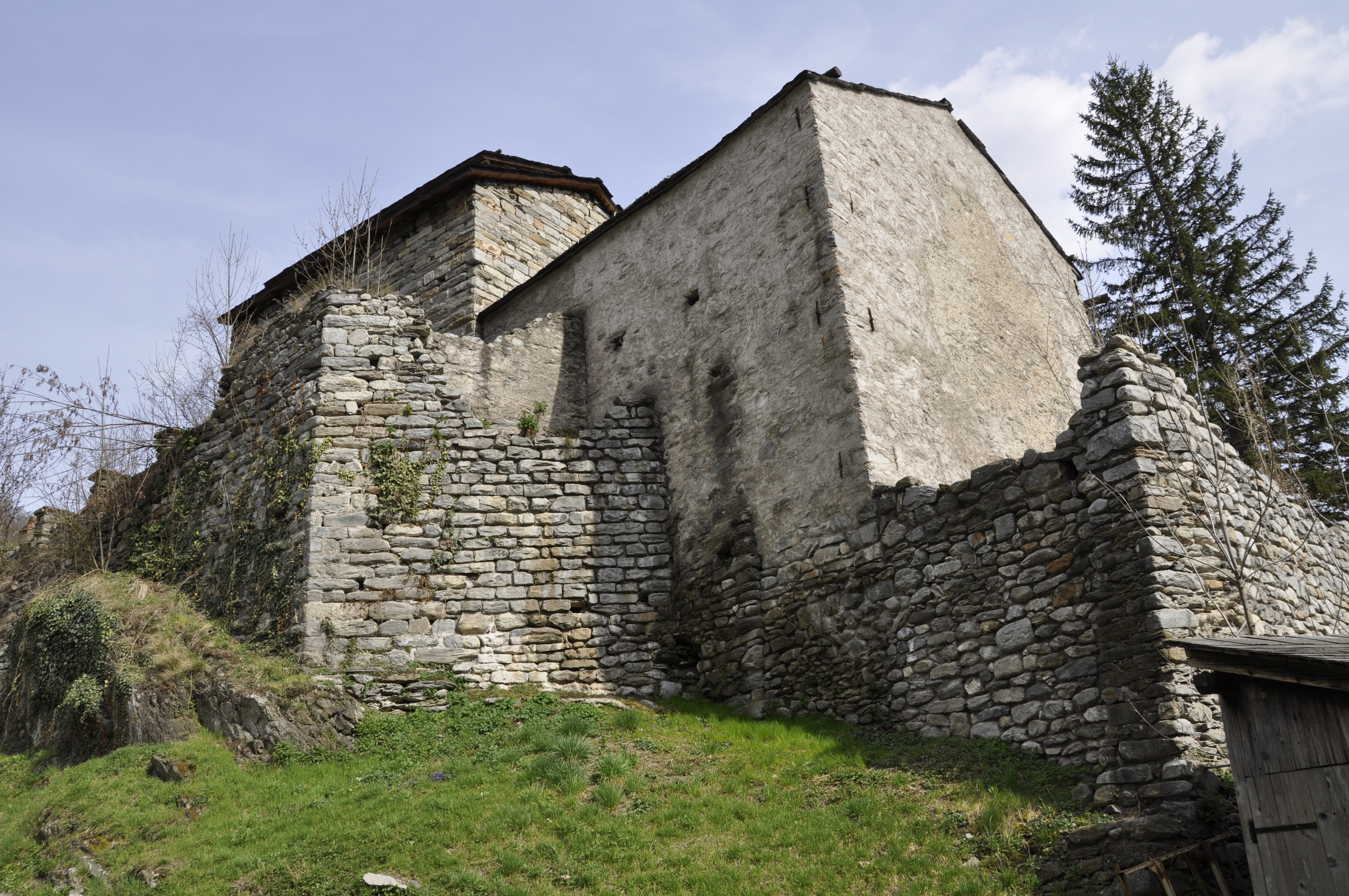
Castle Uff der Flüe

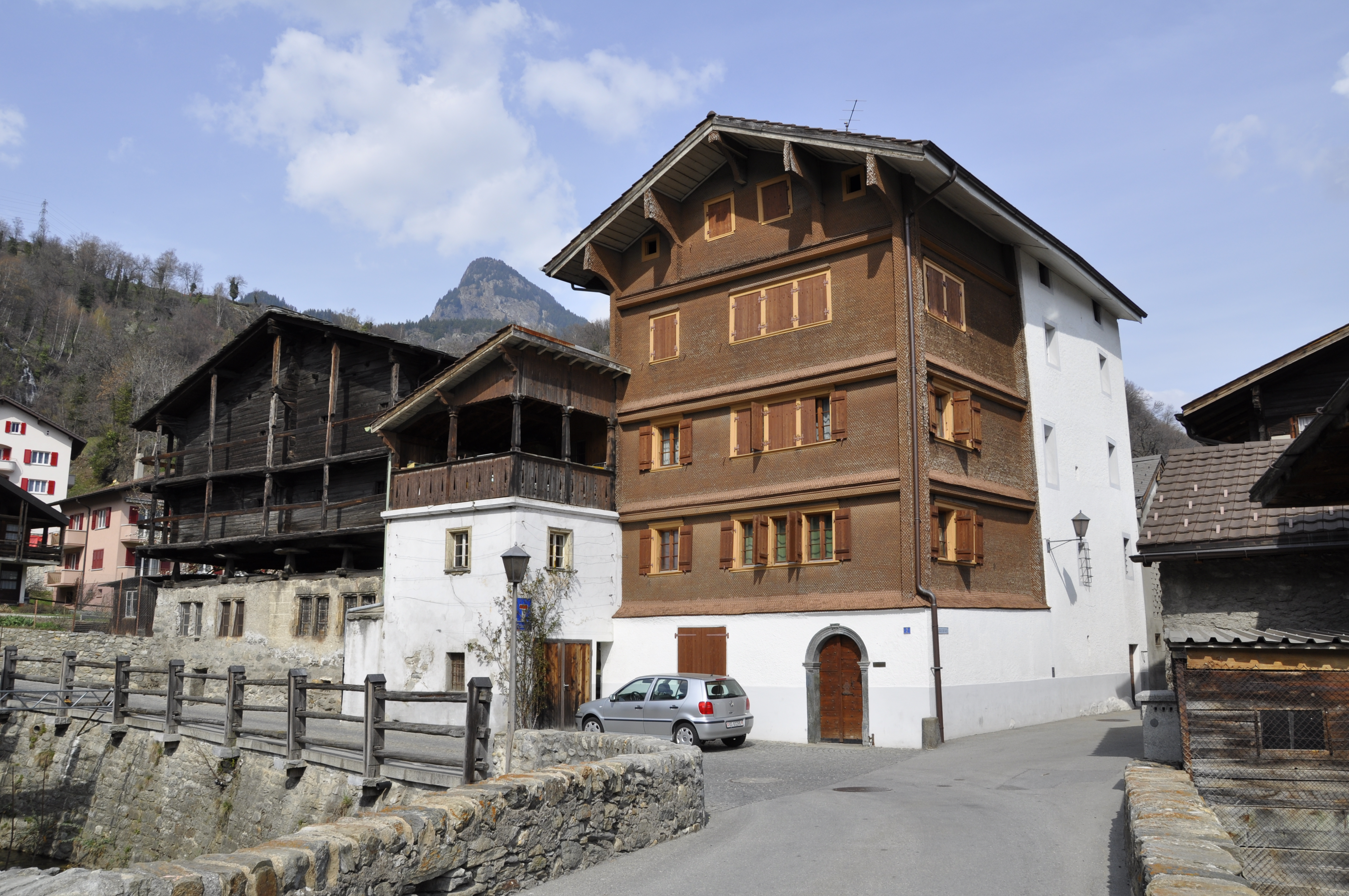
Supersaxo-Haus, Naters.

Supersaxo is the surname of a number of unrelated families of the Upper Valais. It is a latinized locational surname, from Latin super "above" and saxo (ablative) "rock"; as such it is a direct translation of German auf der Fluh (Fluhe, Flüe, Flühe etc.)

The most notable bearers of the name are the Supersaxo auf der Flüe of Naters. They are descended from the Manegoldi, a family of episcopal ministeriales originally of Ernen. They renamed themselves ab der Flue or de Saxo in c. 1340 (Rudolph Super Saxum) after their seat in Naters, the castle Uff der Flüe. After 1352, the castle was occupied by the castellanus of Naters and it intermittently served as residence of the prince-bishops of Sion in the 15th and 16th centuries. Three members of the family served as prince-bishops of Sion. The residence of the early modern Naters residence of the family, known as Supersaxo Haus, was built in 1597. This family was extinct in the male line in 1734.

Other (unrelated) families called Supersaxo are found in Jeizinen (Gampel), Saas-Grund (extinct) and Michel-Supersaxo of Brig.

Notable people with the surname include:

- Georg (Jörg) Supersaxo auf der Flüe (ca. 1450–1529), leader of the Seven Tithings, diplomatic envoy to Milan for the treaty of 1495.
- Walther II. Supersaxo von der Fluhe (ca. 1402–1482), prince-bishop of Sion r. 1457–1482.
- Georg I. Michel-Supersaxo (ca. 1550–1625/26), castellanus of and Landeshauptmann of the Seven Tithings 1593–1595.
- Georg II. Michel-Supersaxo (1601–1676), castellanus of Brig and Landeshauptmann 1664–1670.
- Bartholomeu Supersaxo von der Fluhe (1602–1640), prince-bishop of Sion r. 1638–1640.
- Franz Josef Supersaxo von der Fluhe (1665–1734), prince-bishop of Sion r. 1701–1734.
- Franz Georg Michel-Supersaxo (1661–1705), castellanus of Brig
- Franz Ignaz Michel-Supersaxo (d. 1734), castellanus of Brig
- Aloys Supersaxo of Saas-Fee, alpinist, first ascent of Nadelhorn (1858)
- Ambros Supersaxo of Saas-Fee (1853–1932), alpinist, first ascent of Aiguille Blanche de Peuterey (1885) and of Obermominghorn (1886).
