= Raron family =

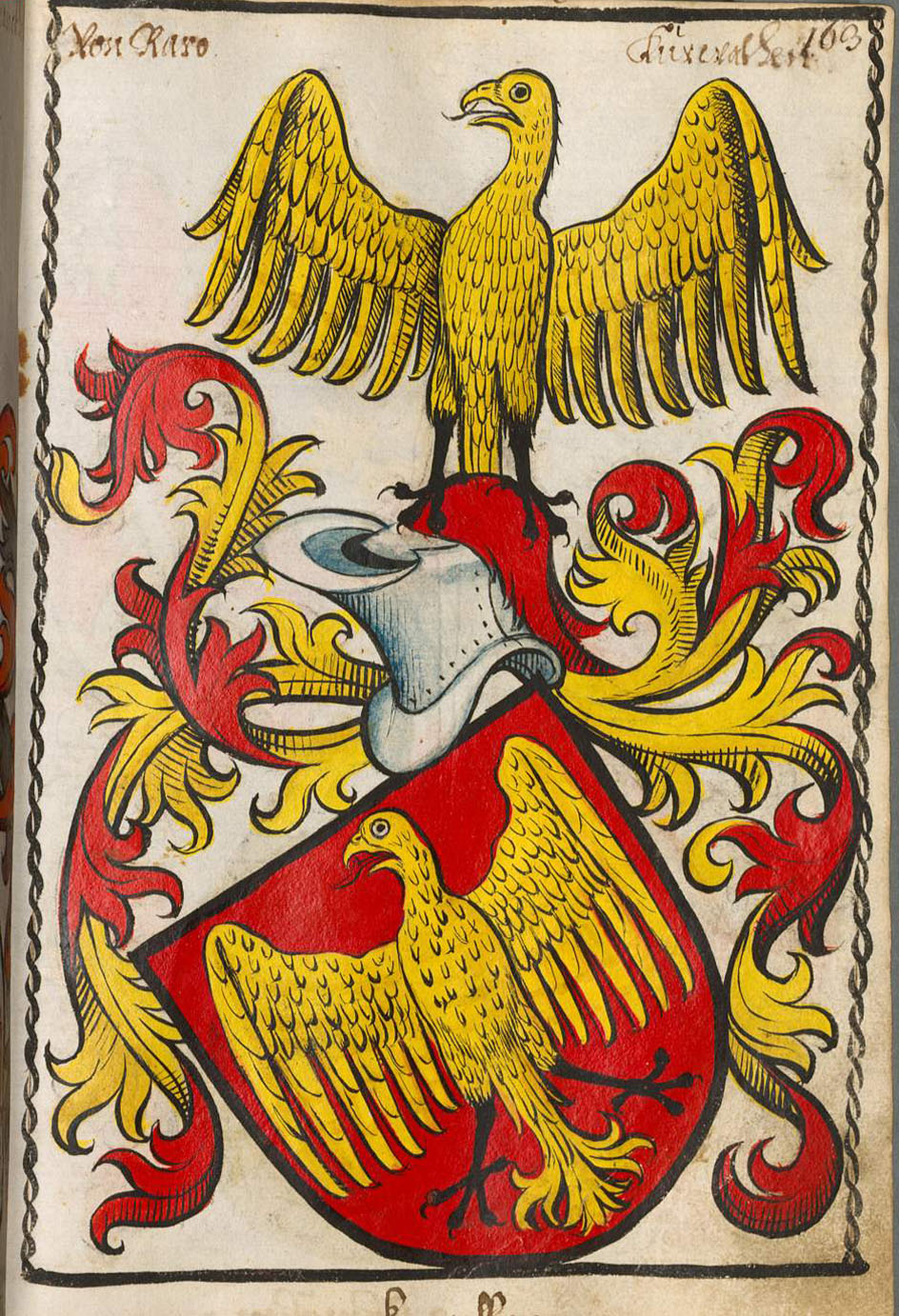
Coat of arms (Scheibler Armorial)

Von Raron (French Rarogne) was an influential noble family in the Valais (the bishopric of Sion) in the late medieval period.

Related to the lords of Ringgenberg, the family held possessions in the area of Raron (Rarogne) in the 12th century, and beginning in the 13th century named themselves after their castle there. Henry, lord of Mannenberg and vice-lord (vicedominus) in Leuk and Rarogne as a vassal of the bishop of Sion, is considered the family's founder. His son Henry would in turn accede to the office of prince-bishop (r. 1243–1271).

Four other prince-bishops were members of the family: Henry II (r. 1273/4), William IV (r. 1394–1402), William V (r. 1402–1418) and William VI (r. 1437–1451).

In the so-called Raron affair of 1413–1420, the population of Upper Valais revolted against the lords of Raron, specifically against bishop William V (also known as William II) and his father Peter of Raron, and the claims of his uncle Witschard of Raron. Emperor Sigismund had granted Witschard sovereignty over the Valais in 1414 as a reward for his military service in Lombardy. The rebels besieged Witschard and his entourage at Seta Castle near Savièse and forced his resignation as episcopal bailiff and gained the right to elect their own representatives in the government. Witschard was forced to leave Valais and appealed to Bern for help, but was unable to gain any support. He then approached Amadeus of Savoy, who allied with Witschard and sent troops into Valais. Supported by Savoy, the Rarons re-occupied their castles, but the rebellion continued in the valley. By 1417 Valais troops had destroyed Beauregard, Tourbillon and Montorge castles, and all centers of the Raron power. Since the family held Bernese citizenship, they again appealed to the city for help in regaining their lands. This resulted in a division of the Swiss Confederation. In September 1417 Witschard and his family had to flee the country permanently. After Valais troops attacked and besieged Raron castles, Bern invaded over the Sanetsch Pass and plundered Sion in 1418. At the Second Battle of Ulrichen in September 1419 the Bernese were forced to retreat. In the peace treaty of 1420, Valais accepted the payment of reparations to the family, but continued to resist their power at every opportunity and continued to self-govern. With his authority damaged, his castles burned and a sullen population, the Baron abandoned Valais and died in Rome in 1431.

Petermann von Raron (c. 1405–1479) was the last baron of Raron, and lord in Toggenburg, participating in the Old Zürich War on the side of the Confederacy. He inherited the rights to the Toggenburg in 1437 via his mother Margaretha of Rhäzuns. Petermann moved to the Toggenburg while his brother Hildebrand remained in the Valais, leading to a de facto division of the Raron lands, even though both brothers nominally were co-regents of the entirety patrimony. Petermann sold Uznach to Schwyz and Glarus in 1437/8. He fought on the side of the Confederacy in their invasion of the territory of Zürich in 1440/1. He later participated in the siege of Winterthur (1460) and in the Waldshut feud against Sigismund, Archduke of Austria (1468).

Both Hildebrand and Petermann died without issue, and the family was extinct upon Petermann's death in 1479.
