= Battle of Ulrichen =

Battle of Ulrichen may refer to two battles that occurred near the village of Ulrichen in the canton of Valais in Switzerland:

- First Battle of Ulrichen in 1211
- Second Battle of Ulrichen in 1419
