= Montorge Castle =

- Sion, Valais, Switzerland
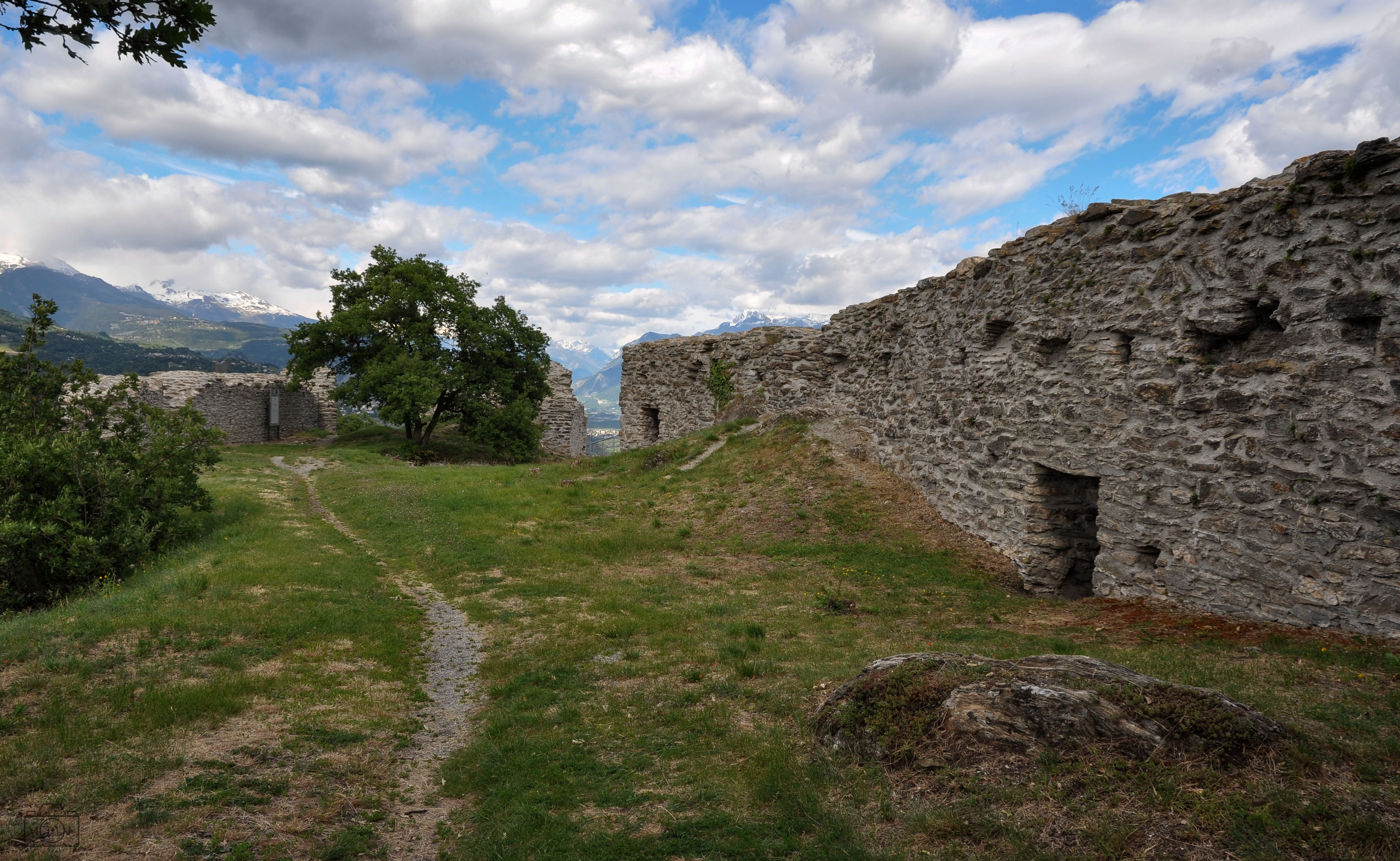
- View of the castle ruins

Site information
- Type: Hill castle, rock castle
- Code: CH
- Condition: Ruins

Location
- Coordinates: 46°13′50″N 7°20′05″E

Site history
- Built: Around 1230
- Materials: Stone masonry

== Montorge Castle ==
The ruins of the Montorge Castle (French: Château de Montorge) are located on a rocky hill, called Mont d'Orge, near Sion, Valais, Switzerland. The name probably originates from the French expression for barley (French: orge), which was commonly cultivated in Valais in the past, but could also originate from “proud” (French: orgueilleux). The site is easily accessible and offers a splendid view of a large part of the Valais. This dominant position motivated the House of Savoy to build this castle already in the middle of the 13th century. The castle then passed into the hands of the Bishop of Sion, and played an important role in several wars during the second half of the 14th century. It was destroyed in 1417 during the Raron affair and was not rebuilt since. The ruin is classified as a Swiss historical monument of regional importance.

== History ==
The castle was built around 1230 by Aymon de Chablais, son of Count Thomas I of Savoy. The site was located on the territory of the Bishop of Sion, and was ideal to oversee passages into the Upper Valais. Obviously, the bishop did not agree with this construction and the situation degenerated into a battle. In an agreement of 1260 between Peter II of Savoy and Bishop Henri de Rarogne the frontier between their respective lands was established at the river Morge. But the castle, belonging to the House of Savoy, was on the wrong side of the border. The agreement therefore stipulated that it must be destroyed. But the Savoyards dragged on with the destruction. In 1264, the bishop lost his patience and took the castle by force. But apparently he liked the castle, because he did not destroy it either, but rather canceled the agreement. Little later, Bishop Pierre d'Oron even had the castle renovated and provided it with a garrison.

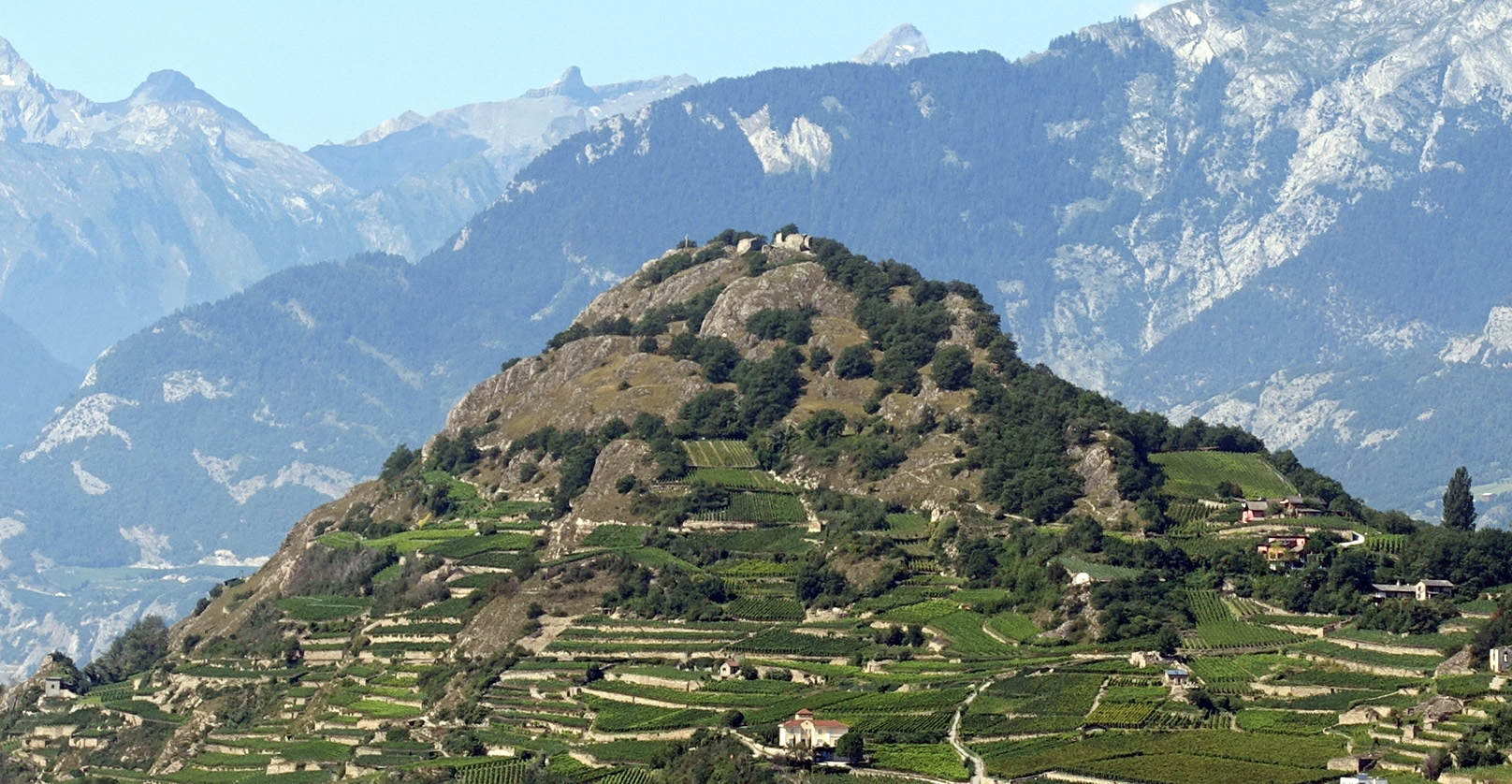
View of the hill Mont d'Orge with the ruins on top from Sion.

In the middle of the 14th century, the troops from the upper Valais under the command of Antoine de la Tour began to threaten the lands of Bishop Witschard Tavel. He sought support from the Count Amédée VI of Savoy, but the latter seized the opportunity to invade Sion and retake the castle. These conflicts culminated in a Civil War in 1364 and the murder of Bishop Tavelli at the Soie Castle in 1375. At that time, the Montorge castle passed into the hands of the house of Savoys.

At the beginning of the 15th century, the Raron family had a major influence in the politics of the Valais, notably through the bishop of Sion, Wilhelm II. von Raron (also called Wilhelm V.). and the governor Witschard von Raron. They also gained control of the castle. However, their reign became unpopular, and eventually the upper Valaisans rebelled against them during the Raron affair. During these battles, the castle of Montorge was destroyed in 1417, together with nearby Beauregard, Soie and Tourbillon castles.

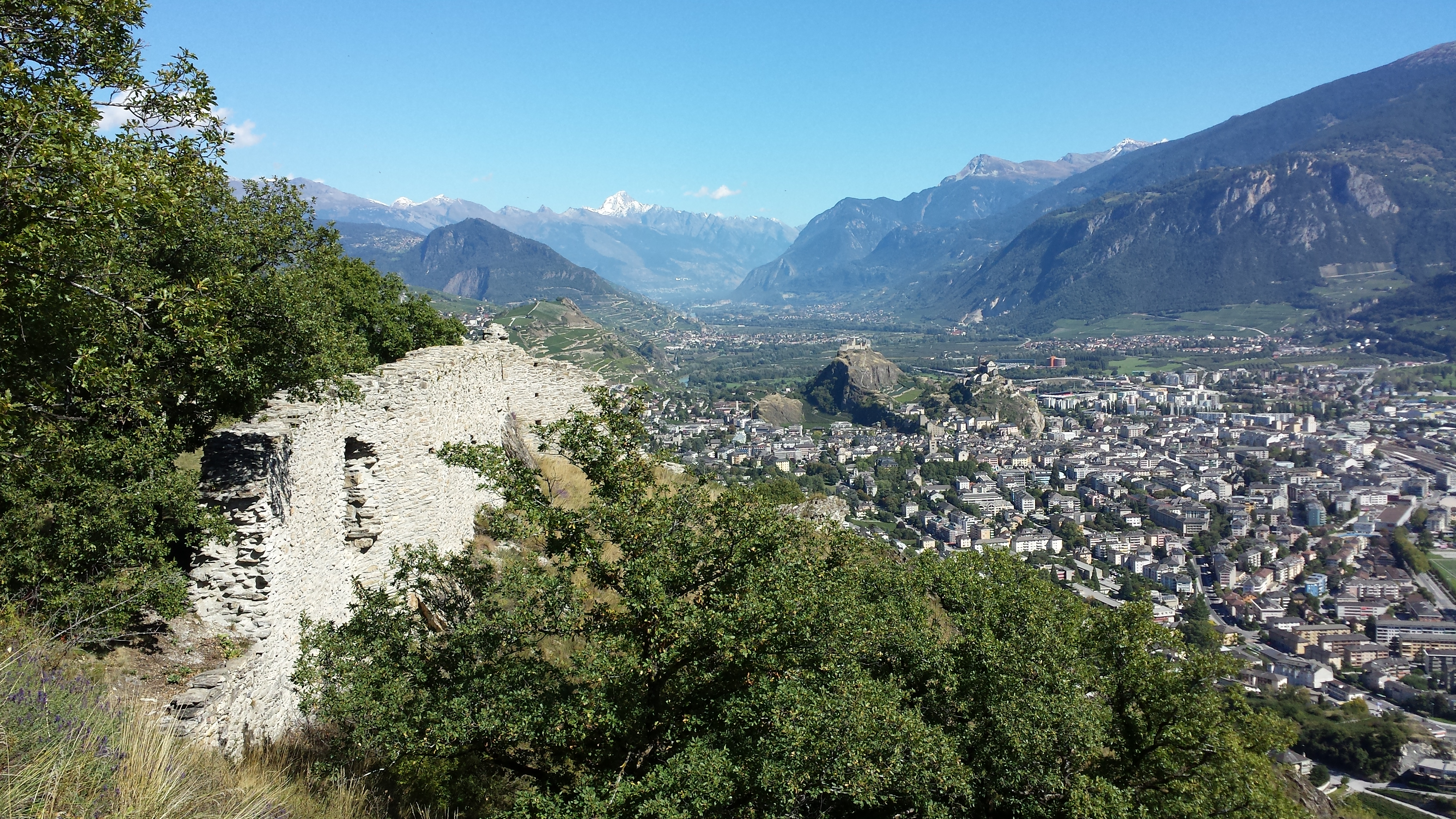
South wall of the castle on the left and Sion on the right. The Tourbillon Castle and the Valère Basilica can be seen in the middle.

The Montorge castle has never been rebuilt since. It is only recently that efforts have been made to revive the ruins. In 2002–2005, archaeological research was carried out on the site, consolidation of the masonry was carried out, and access to the ruin was improved.

== Access and location ==
The ruins occupy the summit of the Mont d'Orge at an elevation of 782 m, 2 kilometers west of Sion allowing a splendid view of the whole valley. The site can easily be reached by foot from the village of Montorge by means of several well-marked trails.

The original access to the castle was located at its eastern side, which was protected on by a ditch dug in the rock and could be crossed by a drawbridge. Then one went around the big tower and arrived at the second entrance, again defended by a ditch and a drawbridge. One could then enter the courtyard of the castle through a very solid gate. The frame of this gate and the big tower are still partially preserved.

The central building was located in the courtyard, but now one can only distinguish the lower floor of this building, in particular, the cellar and the water cistern. Two annexed buildings were located to the south of the main building. The north and south sides of the courtyard was defended by strong walls, but only their south part remains preserved. Loopholes and latrines can be easily recognized in this wall.

The west side of the castle was dominated by a round tower, probably about 15 meters high, which was also protected by a ditch. The foundations of this tower were only found during recent archaeological research.

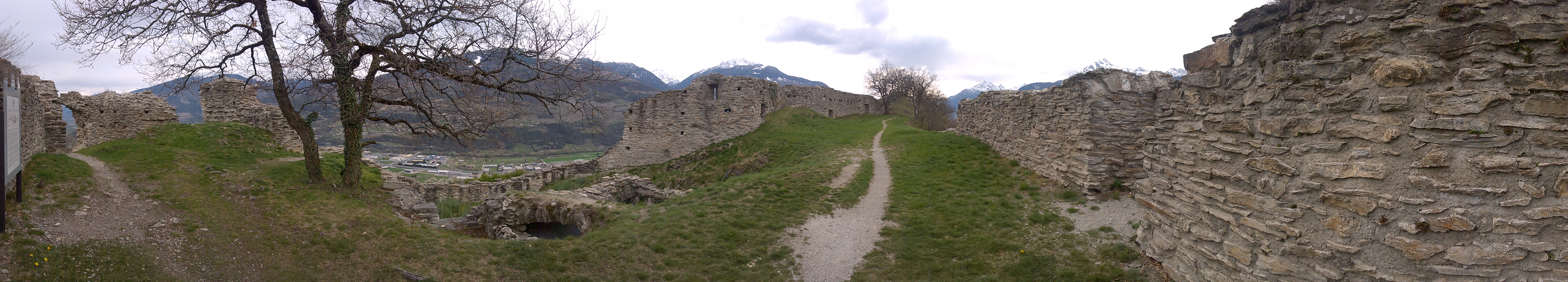
Panorama of the Montorge castle.

== See also ==
- List of castles in Switzerland
- History of Valais
