= Raron affair =

Raron Affair
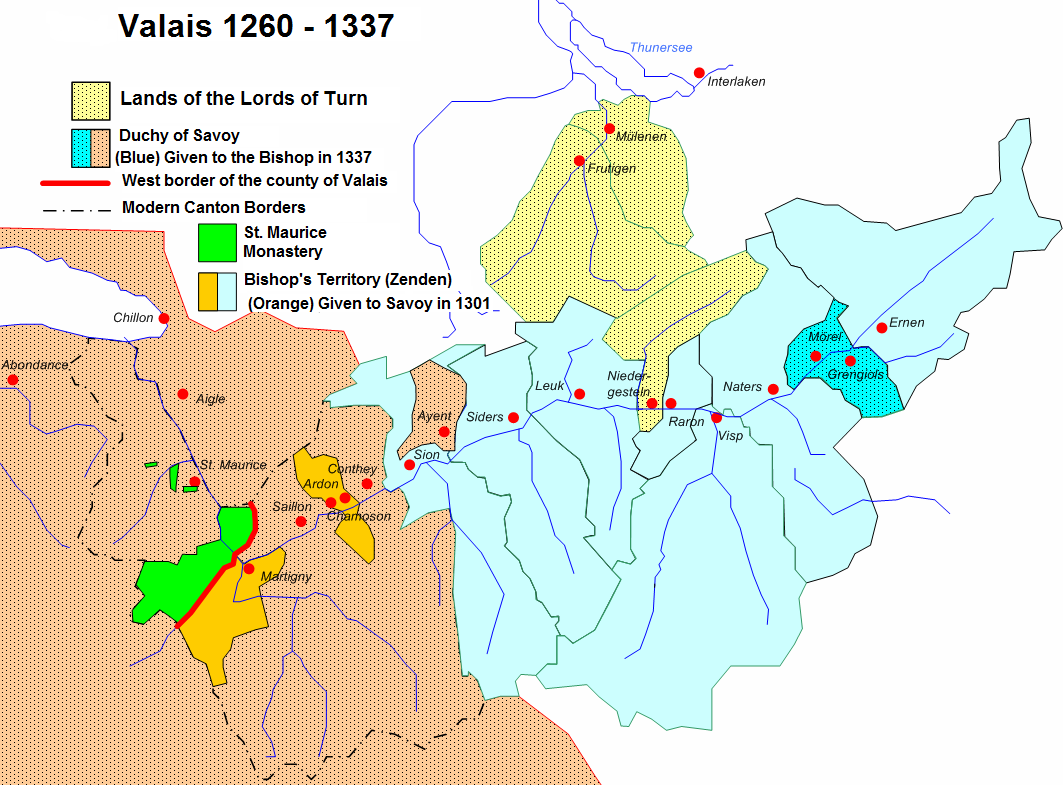
- Map of Valais before the Raron affair
Date	1415–1420
Location	Valais
Result	Marginal rebel victory

Belligerents
Upper Valais rebels Uri; Unterwalden; Lucerne	Bishop of Sion; Raron family Savoy; Berne

Strength
5,000	13,000

The Raron affair (German: Raronhandel) was a 15th-century rebellion in the Valais (the prince-bishopric of Sion) against the power of a local noble family, the Raron family. The rebellion brought several cantons of the Swiss Confederation into conflict with each other and threatened a civil war in the Confederation. While Bern was initially successful, they were eventually forced to surrender most of their gains.

== Background ==
At the end of the 14th and beginning of the 15th centuries, the Baron of Raron rapidly rose to the highest ecclesiastical and secular offices in the Valais. After the death of Bishop William I of Raron in 1402 and his father Peter of Raron in 1413, a rebellious party formed in the Upper Valais. They were opposed to the new Prince-Bishop Wilhelm II of Raron and the claims of his uncle Witschard of Raron. Emperor Sigismund had granted Witschard sovereignty over the Valais in 1414 as a reward for his military service in Lombardy. The rights over the Valais had been granted to the office of the Bishop of Sion in 999. The 1414 Imperial grant was supposed to transfer these rights from the office of the Bishop to the Raron family. The Zehnden from Sierre to Goms were not willing to have gained independence from Savoy to then lose it to a local noble. Additionally, the baron had supported a Savoy invasion of the Ossola south of Valais, further fueling fears that the Baron of Raron would continue to support Savoy.

Fearing that the Rarons planned to restrict their new freedoms, in 1415 the Zenden of the Upper Valais rebelled under the leadership of the Society of the Dog (so called because of the dog on their banner).

== The war ==
The rebels besieged Witschard and his entourage at Seta Castle near Savièse and forced his resignation as episcopal bailiff along with the right to elect their own representatives in the government. Witschard was forced to leave Valais and appealed to Bern for help, but was unable to gain support. He then approached Amadeus VIII of Savoy, who allied with Witschard and sent troops into Valais. Around the same time, the three Zenden of the Upper Valais entered into a treaty with Lucerne, Uri and Unterwalden. Supported by Savoy, the Rarons reoccupied their castles, but the rebellion continued in the valley. By 1417 Valais troops had destroyed Beauregard, Tourbillon and Montorge castles, all centers of the Raron power.

Since the Raron family held Bernese citizenship, they again appealed to the city for help in regaining their lands. When Bern took the Raron side against Lucerne, Uri and Unterwalden, it threatened to split the Swiss Confederation. The neutral cantons, Schwyz, Glarus, Zurich and Zug attempted to intervene and restore peace. However, this was unsuccessful and in September 1417 Witschard and his family had to flee the country permanently. Lucerne, Uri and Unterwalden were reluctant to directly oppose Bern, instead, they chose to invade the Ossola valley. They quickly drove Savoy troops out of the region and weakened the power of the Rarons in nearby Valais.

In 1417 the Confederates met in Lucerne to negotiate a compromise within the Confederation. They were successful in reaching a temporary compromise, but after Valais troops attacked and besieged Raron castles, Bern invaded over the Sanetsch Pass and plundered Sion in 1418. On 25 April 1419 both sides met in Zurich to attempt to reach an agreement. By 15 May of the same year when negotiations were going against the rebels, the Valaisan forces chose to leave the negotiating table and plundered a number of Bernese sheep on the way. In response Bern attempted another invasion across the Grimsel Pass with about 13,000 men. Bern was joined in the invasion by Fribourg, Solothurn, Neuchâtel and a few troops from Schwyz. Both Uri and Unterwalden refused to send troops to either side of the conflict.

The Bernese army marched through the canton burning villages as they came. Lacking support from their allies and outgunned, the Valais troops generally retreated. However, at the Second Battle of Ulrichen in September 1419 a force of 400 to 600 under the leadership of Thomas Brantschen ambushed and fought the Bernese army to a stand still. Fearing that winter storms would soon close the mountain passes the Bernese forces withdrew back over the mountains, followed by a force of 500 Valaisans. The Valais rebels were now isolated and had lost many of their homes while Bern had suffered heavy losses from a small force at Ulrichen. Both sides were now ready to negotiate.

== Aftermath ==
Both sides met together at Zug late in 1419 with the Duke of Savoy as their mediator. On 25 January 1420 a final treaty was issued. Valais was to return the Baron of Raron's castles and lands and pay him 10,000 florins for his losses. They were to also pay Bern 10,000 florins, the Bishop of Sion 4,000 and the Duke of Savoy 1,000. Valais accepted the terms but continued to resist the Baron at every opportunity and continued to self-govern. With his authority damaged, his castles burned and a sullen population, the Baron abandoned Valais and died in Rome in 1431. The compromise reached in 1419 at Zurich reinforced the supremacy of the Confederation over the alliances of the individual members.

== See also ==
- Battles of the Old Swiss Confederacy
