= Second Battle of Ulrichen =

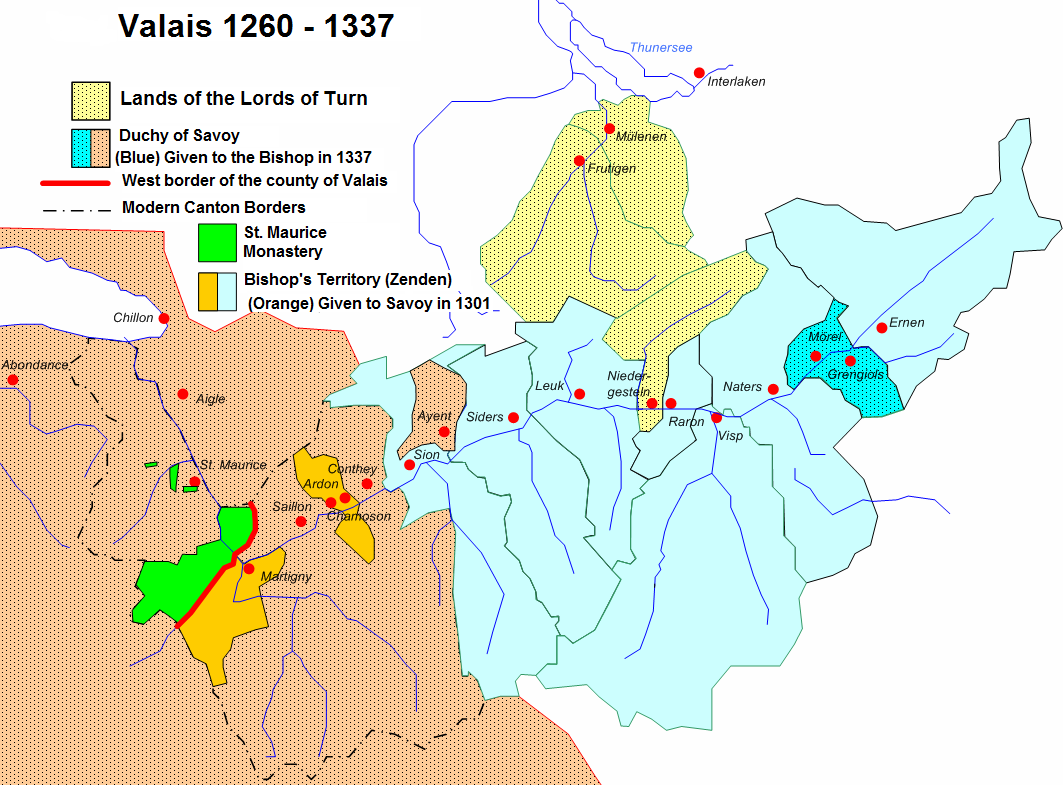
- Map of Valais before the Raron affair
Date	1419
Location	Canton of Valais 46°30′N 8°18′E
Result	Valais victory

Belligerents
Valais	Bern; Fribourg; Solothurn; Neuchâtel

Strength
400–600	13,000
- Location of the Battle of Ulrichen Second Battle of Ulrichen (Switzerland)

The Second Battle of Ulrichen was fought in 1419 between the Old Swiss Confederacy led by Bern and rebels from Valais near Ulrichen (now part of Obergoms) in the district of Goms in the canton of Valais in Switzerland. Negotiations after the battle led to the end of the Raron affair and self-determination for Valais.

== Background ==
During the late 14th century and early 15th century the residents of Valais were seeking independence from the Duke of Savoy. Around the same time the local noble Raron family had grown into one of the most powerful families in Valais. In 1413/14 the Emperor Sigismund had granted authority over the region to Prince-Bishop Wilhelm II of Raron and his uncle Witschard of Raron. Fearing a loss of their rights and privileges a rebellious movement had sprung up in the valley. When the baron supported a Savoy invasion of the Ossola south of Valais the leaders of the movement became increasingly concerned.

In 1415 open rebellion broke out in the valley. The Barons of Raron allied with, first the Duke of Savoy and then Bern, while the three Zenden of the Upper Valais entered into a treaty with Lucerne, Uri and Unterwalden. Supported by Savoy, the Rarons reoccupied their castles, but the rebellion continued in the valley. When Bern took the Raron side against Lucerne, Uri and Unterwalden it threaten to split the Swiss Confederation. The neutral cantons, Schwyz, Glarus, Zurich and Zug attempted to intervene and restore peace. However, this was unsuccessful and in September 1417 Witschard and his family had to flee the country permanently. Lucerne, Uri and Unterwalden were reluctant to directly oppose Bern, instead, they chose to invade the Ossola valley. They quickly drove Savoy troops out of the region and weakened the power of the Rarons in nearby Valais.

In 1417 the Confederates met in Lucerne to negotiate a compromise within the Confederation. They were successful in reaching a temporary compromise, but after Valais troops attacked and besieged Raron castles, Bern invaded over the Sanetsch Pass and plundered Sion in 1418. On 25 April 1419 both sides met in Zurich to attempt to reach an agreement. By 15 May of the same year when negotiations were going against the rebels, the Valaisan forces chose to leave the negotiating table and plundered a number of Bernese sheep on the way.

== The 1419 invasion ==
In response to the raids and attacks, Bern attempted another invasion across the Grimsel Pass with about 13,000 men. Bern was joined in the invasion by Fribourg, Solothurn, Neuchâtel, and a few troops from Schwyz. Both Uri and Unterwalden refused to send troops to either side of the conflict.

The Bernese army marched through the canton burning villages as they came. Lacking support from their allies and outnumbered, the Valais troops generally retreated. However, in September 1419 near the village of Ulrichen a force of 400 to 600 under the leadership of Thomas Brantschen ambushed and fought the Bernese army to a standstill. Fearing that winter storms would soon close the mountain passes the Bernese forces withdrew back over the mountains, followed by a force of 500 Valaisans. The Valais rebels were now isolated and had lost many of their homes while Bern had suffered heavy losses from a small force at Ulrichen. Both sides were now ready to negotiate.

== Aftermath ==
Both sides met together at Zug late in 1419 with the Duke of Savoy as their mediator. On 25 January 1420 a final treaty was issued. Valais was to return the Baron of Raron's castles and lands and pay him 10,000 florins for his losses. They were to also pay Bern 10,000 florins, the Bishop of Sion 4,000 and the Duke of Savoy 1,000. Valais accepted the terms but continued to resist the Baron at every opportunity and continued to self-govern. With his authority damaged, his castles burned and a sullen population, the Baron abandoned Valais and died in Rome in 1431. The compromise reached in 1419 at Zurich reinforced the supremacy of the Confederation over the alliances of the individual members.

== See also ==
- List of battles of the Old Swiss Confederacy
- First Battle of Ulrichen
