= Soie Castle =

Ruined castle in the municipality of Savièse

- La Soie; Burg Seta
- Savièse
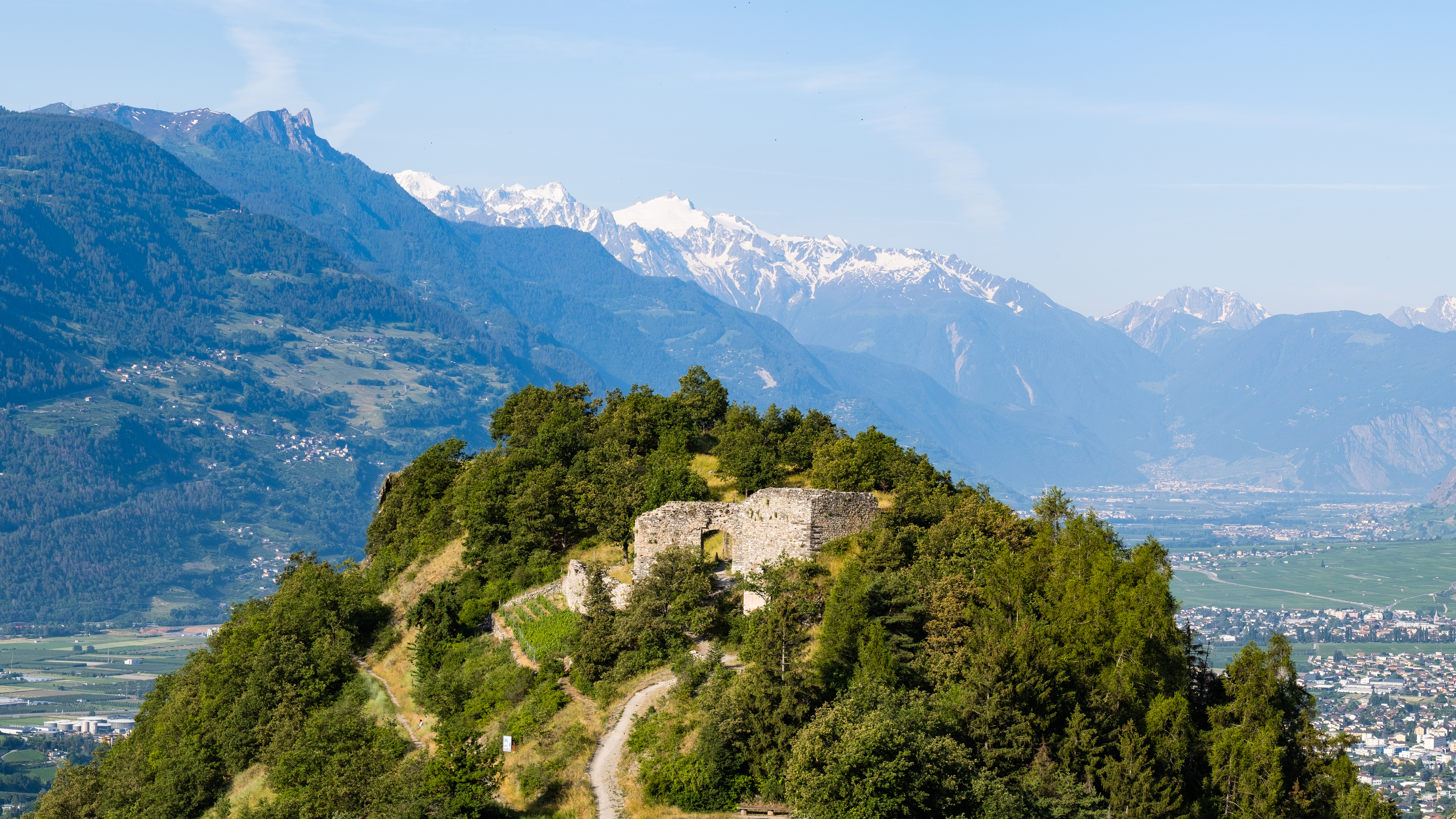
- Ruins of Soie Castle

Site information
- Type: Castle Ruins
- Open to the public: yes

Location
- Coordinates: 46.2432°N 7.3252°E

Site history
- Built: 1200
- Built by: Bishop of Sion
- Battles/wars: Raron affair (1417)

Soie Castle (German: Seta Castle) is a ruined castle in the municipality of Savièse of the Canton of Valais in Switzerland.

== History ==
Soie Castle was built around 1200 by Landri de Mont, the Bishop of Sion, possibly to restrict the power of the Counts of Savoy in Valais. During the conflicts between the bishop and the counts during the 13th century the castle was not damaged and in a 1260 peace treaty was listed as remaining in the bishop's hands. By the mid 14th century Bishop Guichard Tavel had moved from the old fortress of Tourbillon to Soie.

However, Bishop Tavel only had a few years to enjoy Soie. The bishop had a long standing feud with the de la Tour family. On 8 August 1375 Antoine de la Tour and his soldiers entered the castle looking for the Bishop. They found him reading his breviary in the garden and seizing him, dragged the Bishop to the top of the walls before hurling him off to the rocks below. The murder of the Bishop caused unrest throughout Valais and his successor, Edward of Savoy, was driven out of Valais when a force of Valais patriots captured Soie Castle. Almost ten years later, in 1384, Count Amadeus VII finally recaptured the castle and reinstalled the bishop in his office.

In 1417, during the Raron affair Valais troops burned Soie Castle along with several of the bishop's other castles. After its destruction, the castle was abandoned and allowed to fall further into ruin.

== Castle site ==
The castle is located on the hill side south-west of Savièse and near Sion. The site is divided into three sections, each separated by a ditch or dry moat. The best preserved section is the outer castle, which was divided into several rooms with a well preserved gate way. The other sections are the main castle and the garden area.

== See also ==
- List of castles in Switzerland
