= Openpass =

RFID access control system

OpenPass is a method for data recording on RFID card in an integrated access control system, with proprietary software by different providers. OpenPass is released under the GPL license.

== The OpenPass system ==
The OpenPass system consists of:

- contactless smartcard ISO 15693, without proprietary restrictions;
- ticket counters and gates compatible with the standard
- central server and open platform for data collection
- web service connection and data transmission real-time or [batch].

To allow the exchange of information between heterogeneous access control systems, OpenPass defines an interchange format through the use of metalanguage XML. Access credentials are stored on the smartcard and organized through the use of markers, represented in XML. The XML representations are made public by the server OpenPass. With a single RFID card, the user access to all sites in the system: each company is able to issue the ticket yourself and the card is recognized by every member of the system independently. The OpenPass standard defines a distributed network of data centers, that are web service connected with the server. The information collected by data centers regarding sales and passages to the gates and they are sent to the central server. The exchange format between server and collection centers is XML. The OpenPass server receives the data and stores them in a centralized SQL database, where each data item is related to a UID and any personal details of the customer.

== Highlights of OpenPass ==
The methodology OpenPass is characterized by:

- data accessible and understandable by users;
- fast and "hands-free" passage to the gates;
- online recharge and presale pass;
- safety of access credentials are encrypted in emission;
- multifunctionality;
- management division of the profits from sales of tickets valid for multiple domains;
- possibility of batch operation of control system, in hostile contexts where the connection is not continuous;
- reducing the cost of cards and equipment since it is not bound to proprietary software.

== OpenPass projects ==
For now, OpenPass is applied to control systems access to the ski lifts, in Italy and France:

=== Italy: Skipass Lombardia ===
Skipass Lombardia was the first example in Europe of open standard for integrated access control systems with heterogeneous and proprietary software. OpenPass has created an integrated system for all companies of skilifts in the Lombardy Region: 310 ski lifts, 46 companies in 30 ski areas.

=== France: Nordic Pass Rhône Alpes ===
The Federation of Nordic skiing in the French region of Rhône-Alpes (FRAN) has promoted the Nordic Pass Rhône Alpes: a project of integrated access to 5000 km of ski runs in 83 stations of Nordic skiing, with OpenPass standard.

=== Italy: SkiArea VCO ===
In the Alps of Piedmont, Neveazzurra ski resort has implemented SkiArea VCO: a project of integrated access to the stations of Neveazzurra resort: Alpe Devero, Antrona Cheggio, Ceppo Morelli, Domobianca (Domodossola), Druogno, Formazza, Macugnaga, Mottarone, Piana di Vigezio, Pian di Sole, San Domenico (Varzo).
