= Neveazzurra =

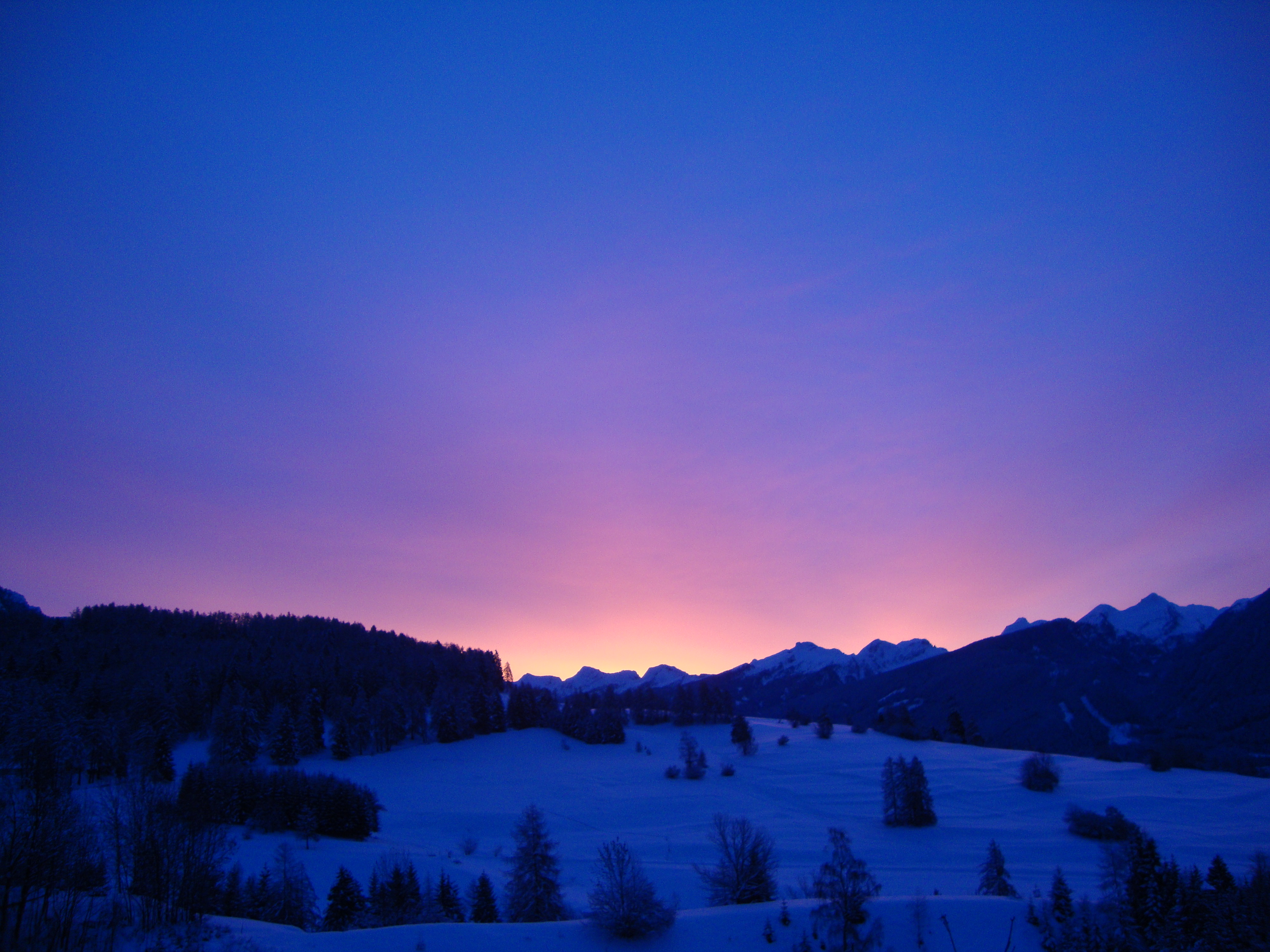
Dawn at Neveazzurra

The Neveazzurra (Blue-snow) is a winter sports area in the Italian Alps, in Verbanio Cusio Ossola province (Piedmont). 150 kilometers of trails, 50 lifts from 1,000 to 3,000 meters and the opportunity to practice a wide variety of winter sports: alpine skiing, cross country skiing, off-piste skiing, downhill skiing, snow park, ice skating and ice climbing, free -Ride and heli-skiing.

== Stations of the ski area ==
The most well known of the ski area include:

- Alpe Devero,
- Antrona Cheggio,
- Ceppo Morelli,
- Domobianca (Domodossola),
- Druogno,
- Formazza,
- Macugnaga,
- Mottarone,
- Piana di Vigezzo,
- Pian di Sole,
- San Domenico di Varzo.

== SkiArea VCO ==
Neveazzurra ski resort has implemented SkiArea VCO: a project of integrated access to the stations of Neveazzura resort, that uses the Openpass standard.
