= Chiesa Vecchia, Macugnaga =

Church in Piedmont, Italy

Old Church, Macugnaga
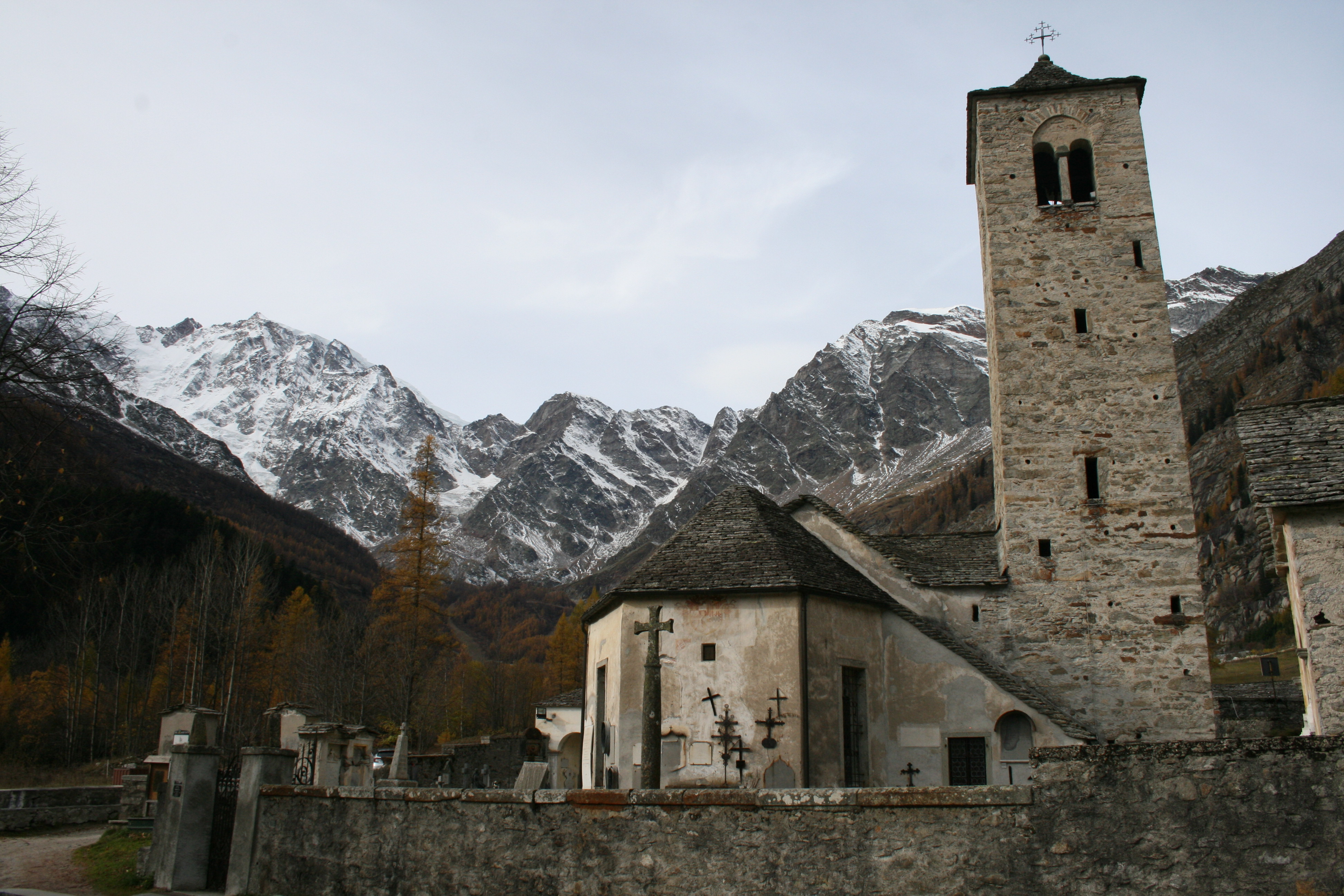
- Old Church, Macugnaga
- Click on the map for a fullscreen view
- 45°58′15.15615″N 7°57′50.69116″E
- Location: Macugnaga
- Country: Italy
- Denomination: Catholic Church
- Tradition: Latin Church

History
- Status: Minor church
- Dedication: Blessed Mary of the Assumption

Architecture
- Architectural type: Church
- Style: Gothic architecture
- Groundbreaking: 13th Century

Administration
- Province: Verbano-Cusio-Ossola
- Diocese: Novara

Clergy
- Bishop: Franco Giulio Brambilla

The Old Church (Italian: Chiesa Vecchia) is a small church located in the alpine village of Macugnaga in northern Italy, at the foot of Monte Rosa. The church was built in the second half of the 13th century and was dedicated to the Blessed Mary of the Assumption. The church is surrounded by a cemetery where many alpinists, climbers, and writers have been buried or honoured. It is located in the Dorf, a neighbourhood of the village where the Walser people used to live in huts made of larch trunks. Adjacent to the religious building, there is an ancient tree named The Old Linden (Italian: Vecchio Tiglio), which is approximately 700 years old.

== History ==
=== Origin ===
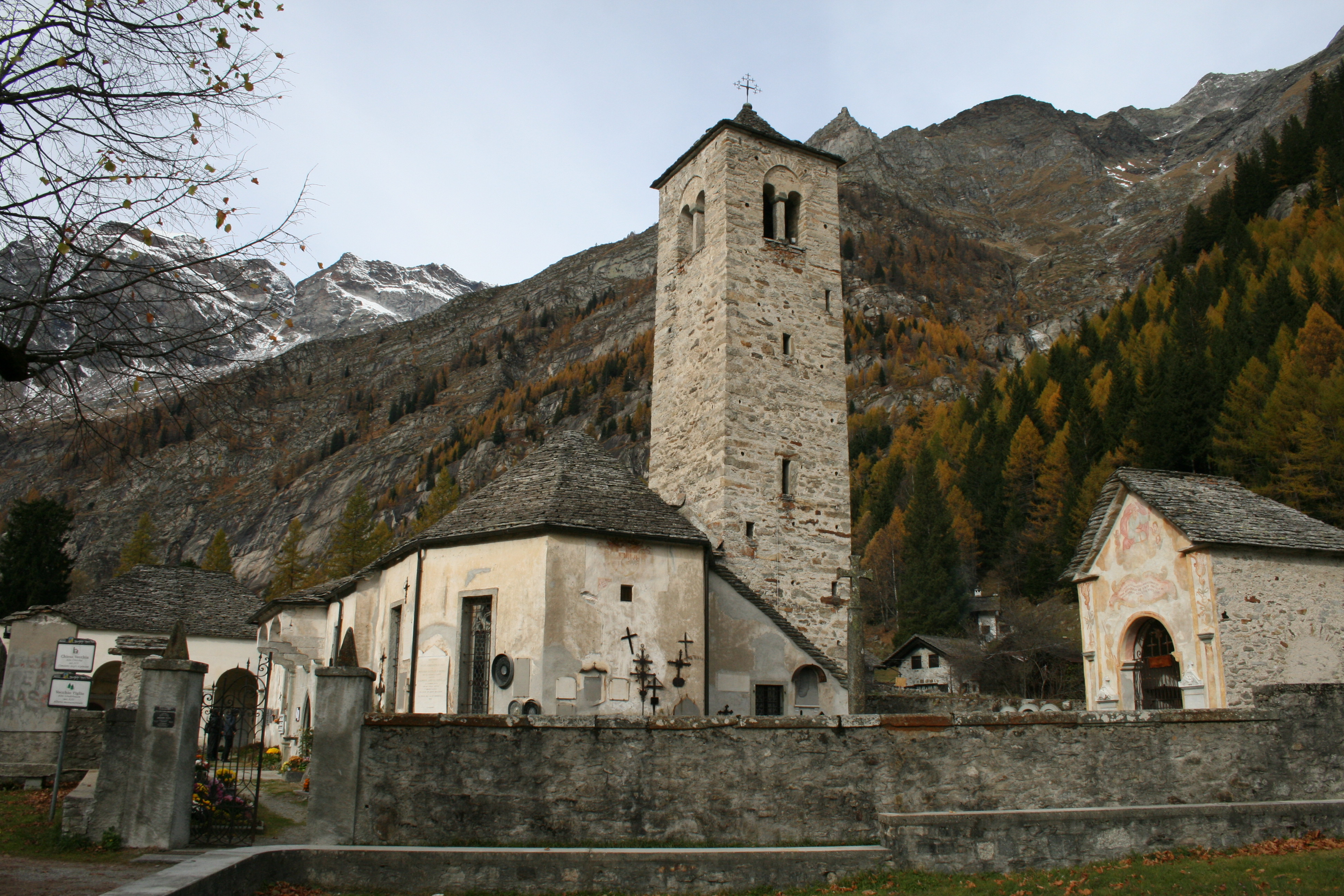
Old Church surrounded by the cemetery

The Old Church was the first parish church of Macugnaga. In 1250, Italian Earl Gotofredo married a rich woman, Aldisia, who offered as her dowry the Anzasca Valley in Italy and the Viège Valley in Switzerland. When the two valleys were unified, the population of the Swiss valley moved to Macugnaga since the climate was warmer. After moving, they started to build the Old Church. More precisely, according to a document signed in 1317 AD, the church should have been built in the second half of the 13th century. Since the village did not have an autonomous parish, the aim was to build the second religious building of the Anzasca Valley in which the priest of the nearby parish could perform religious ceremonies. The Old Church was designed as a small building with a structure similar to the existing local constructions. According to the conventions of the time, the apse and presbytery were oriented to the east, while the façade pointed to the west. The building was dedicated to the Blessed Mary of the Assumption; however, the wooden sculpture depicting the Virgin Mary located on the altar does not refer to the Mystery of the Assumption since it was taken from a local chapel. At the end of the 14th century, Macugnaga was granted the opportunity to establish an autonomous parish centered at the Old Church. The church had its properties and was administered by two curators and a custodian.

=== Early 16th century ===
The Old Church was restored and partially rebuilt in the 16th century because of damage due to hailstorms.

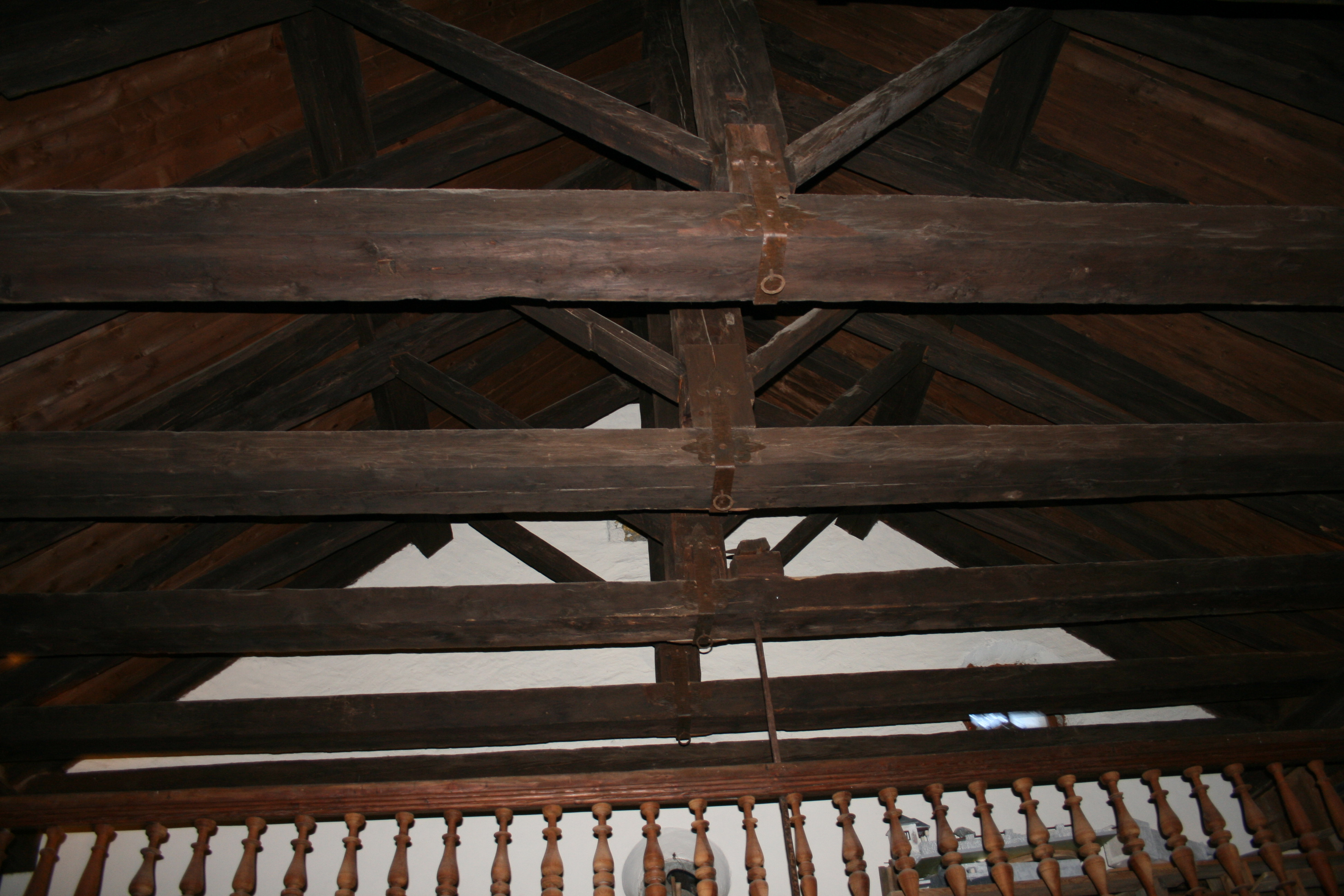
The ceiling made up of wooden planks in the Old Church

During the renovation work, the local population decided to add an altar dedicated to Saint Theodore as a vow to remain safe from the increasing natural disasters. The permission was granted through an act signed by Josto Albasini, vicar of the nearby parish of Bannio on 16 August 1501. In 1510, the church was enlarged eastwards by building a new apse and a door in the middle of the left side, according to the Gothic style. The original altar, dedicated to Saint Theodore, was replaced by one dedicated to Saint Catherine of Alexandria. A new construction was built to solve the problem of burying the corpses during winter when the soil was frozen and covered in snow. This building was a "carnerium", namely a combination of a charnel house and a chapel, dedicated to Saint Michael the Archangel since he was believed to protect dying souls. The presbytery and the main body of the church were not restored since they remained covered in wood to protect the members of the religious community from the cold temperatures of the winter months. The ceiling of the church also remained made of wooden planks, which were later decorated with portrayals of flowers and animals signed by "Meister Peter Mory von Fryburg", a Swiss artist from Zürich who at the time was living in Macugnaga.

When the restoration was completed, it was decided to reconsecrate the religious building. On 17 June 1523, an auxiliary bishop came to Macugnaga to perform this task and grant indulgences to all those that made offerings during specific religious festivals. To commemorate the date of the consecration, an inscription in Latin was carved under the window located next to the altar, which states: Dies anniversaria huius Ecclesiae agitur dominica prima Maii ("The anniversary day of the church has to be celebrated the first Sunday of May").

=== Late 16th century ===
Around the 1550s, the church was enlarged by adding three small chapels, one containing the altar dedicated to Saint Catherine of Alexandria. In 1580, the altar was destroyed along with the chapel in order to build the new bell tower. When the ecclesiastical authorities approved this project, they ordered the relocation of the altar in a space which would have later become the Saint Rosario chapel.

This renovation included the reconstruction of the entrance door and the building of a porch before the side door; this allowed community members to gather in all weather conditions.

=== Early and mid-17th century ===
In the following years, bishop Carlo Bascapè came to Macugnaga twice, in 1596 and in 1603. During the first visit, he claimed that the church was lacking liturgical furnishings. During the second visit, he noticed that the local population had not followed his orders to renovate the religious building. From then on, another renovation work was carried out and it was approved by the succeeding bishop Ferrante Taverna during his visit in 1618. The altar was rebuilt together with the altarpiece; the relics, contained in an arm-shaped reliquary, were placed in an ancient tabernacle. Above the altar, in a wooden niche, there was a wooden statue entitled “Virgin Mary with a child in her arms, gilded in an ancient style”.

In the church there were:

Liturgical furnishings	Function
Oil and tempera paintings	Decoration
Wooden pulpit	Preaching
Baptismal font	Christening
Coffers in the sacristy	Storage
Offertory boxes	Collection of funds
Balustrades made of a grey local soapstone	Decoration

=== Late 17th century–18th century ===
On 1 January 1639, a fire broke out in the neighbouring area of Dorf, while the Walser community was attending the church service in the Old Church officiated by the parish priest Konrad Humpert. The freezing winter temperatures prevented the local population from using water to stop the fire, which could not be contained. Forty houses were destroyed and the Old Church was slightly damaged. On 19 September 1640, a flood hit Macugnaga and the local Tambach stream burst its banks, covering in mud both the Old Church and the cemetery, which were permanently damaged. After these two natural disasters, the local population worked to protect the church from the natural force of the water and from avalanches. The porch before the door of the church was replaced by a similar construction in stone, and the cemetery was provided with a new entrance gate. The parish priest decided to purchase a house to store the liturgical furnishings and save them from further damage.

In 1687, an avalanche near the Old Church made the surrounding forests thinner, increasing the risk of further avalanche damage. In 1720, the church was struck by lightning. Other floods were recorded in 1755 and in 1772. After further natural disasters, it was decided to build a new parish church in a less vulnerable area. The Old Church remained in function until the new church was consecrated in 1759. From then on, the local population committed to preserving the church with dignity.

== Parish priests ==
The list of parish priests of Macugnaga from 1597 to 1869:

Name	Surname	Place of origin	Period
Ugone		Fribourg	1597–1612
Giovanni	Giget	Alagna	1612–1616
Corrado	Humperto	Endinghen	1617–1640
Giovanni	Gorino	Fribourg	1640–1645
Bartolomeo	Jacchini	Macugnaga	1646–1665
Bartolomeo	De Dominici	Salecchio Inferiore	1670–1675
Giovanni Cristoforo	Guerrini	Macugnaga	1676–1713
Giacomo Costantino	Jacchini	Macugnaga	1713–1717
Giovanni Angelo	Neri	Finero in Antigorio Valley	1718–1743
Giuseppe Maria	Paggi	Varzo	1744–1754
Giuseppe	Matli	Formazza	1754–1786
Cristoforo	Della Vedova	Rima in Valsesia	1786–1819
Giambattista	Cusa	Rimella	1827–1843
Giuseppe	Bottanini	Ceppo Morelli	1843–1863
Felice	Jacchini	Macugnaga	From 1869

== Architecture and art ==
The beams of the roof trusses denote an ancient style. There are three gothic windows in the presbytery, and another two, from the 17th century, in the body separated from the apse through a Gothic arch. The ceiling of the presbytery was decorated by Peter Mory in 1513, when he was living in Macugnaga. The altarpiece located above the altar in a niche represents the Virgin Mary on a throne surrounded by a drape held by angels. The altar is decorated with a wooden tabernacle from the 17th century.

Towards the end of the 17th century, the church was enriched with a large number of relics coming from the Roman catacombs. These relics (among them those of the Saints Antonino, Eusebio, Olimpio, Aurelio, Vittoria, Salvatore, and Innocenza) were kept in special deposits built in local soapstone, placed next to the altar. The balustrade, which is built of the same local stone, separates the presbytery from the body of the church, which is not aligned with the presbytery, since it widens considerably to the north, giving space to an altar dedicated to Saint Anthony of Padua (with a wooden altarpiece placed in 1657) and two rooms with an altar dedicated to the Madonna del Rosario and to Saint Catherine Martyr (now occupied by a grotto of Lourdes built in 1910). There is also another chapel—where there was once the baptismal font—now dedicated to Saint Bernard of Aosta, patron of the mountaineers.

Among the furnishings of the church, there is a small wooden pulpit hanging on the southern wall, a walnut wood confessional from the 17th century, a couple of paintings with various saints, a 17th century statue representing Saint Charles Borromeo, and two smaller statues placed alongside the main altar representing Saint Erasmus Martyr (with his guts wrapped) and Saint Mauro. At the back of the church, above the door, there is a large 16th-century balcony, to which only men had access. Finally, there is the floor, built of large stones, and the few remaining specimens of larch benches, noted for the inscriptions and dates engraved on them.

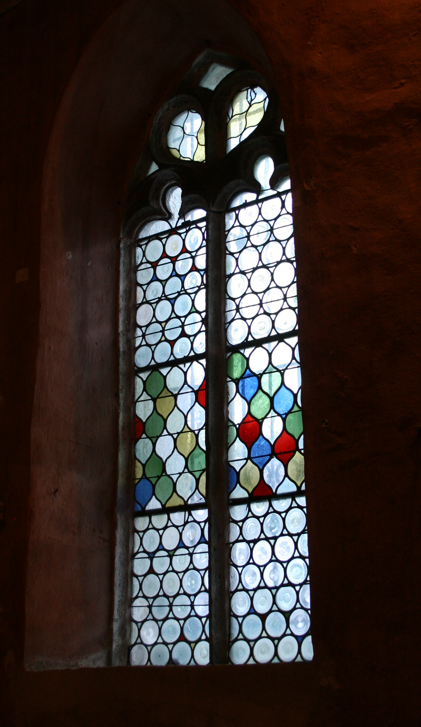
Gothic window in the Old Church

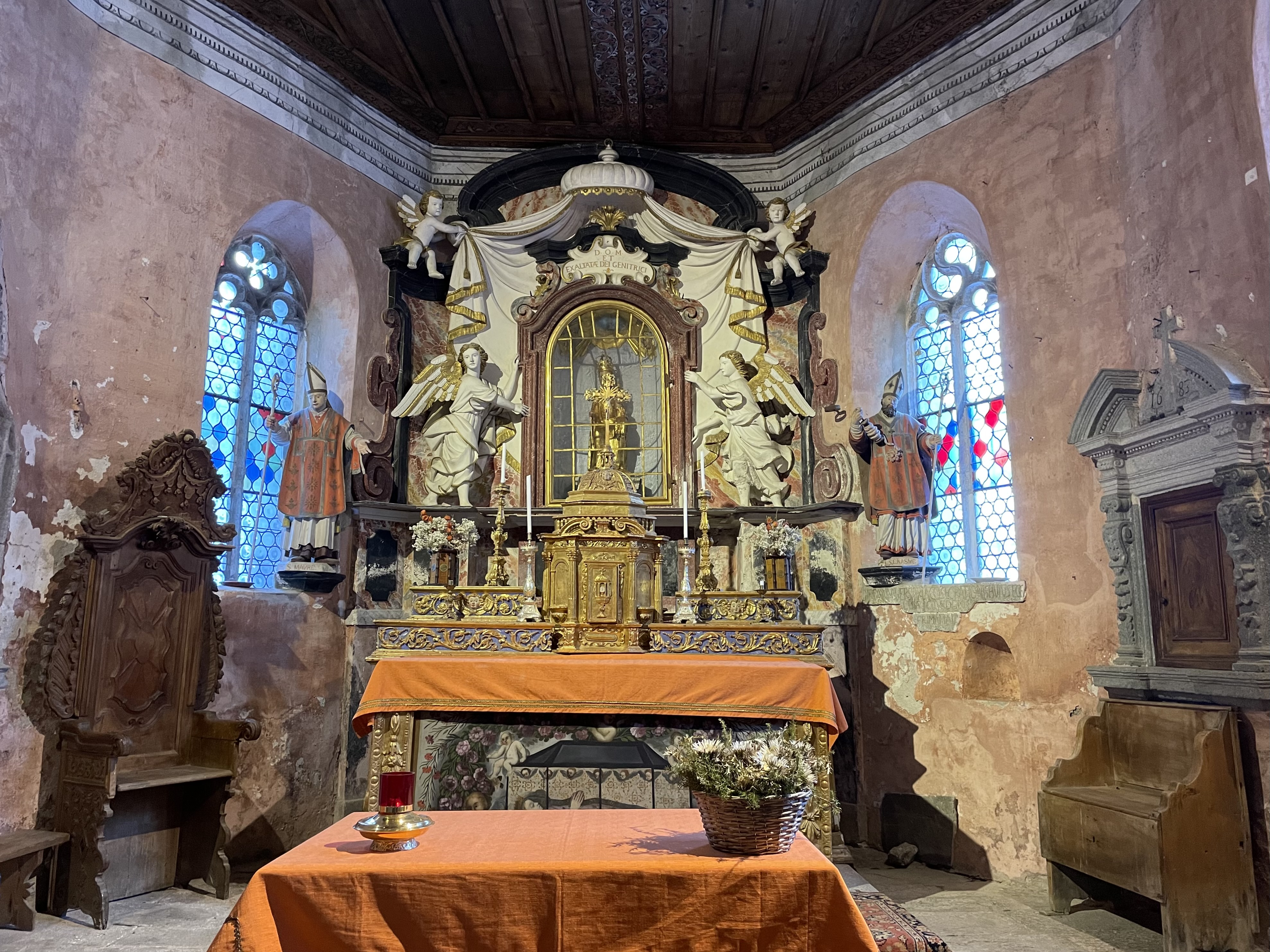
Altar in the Old Church

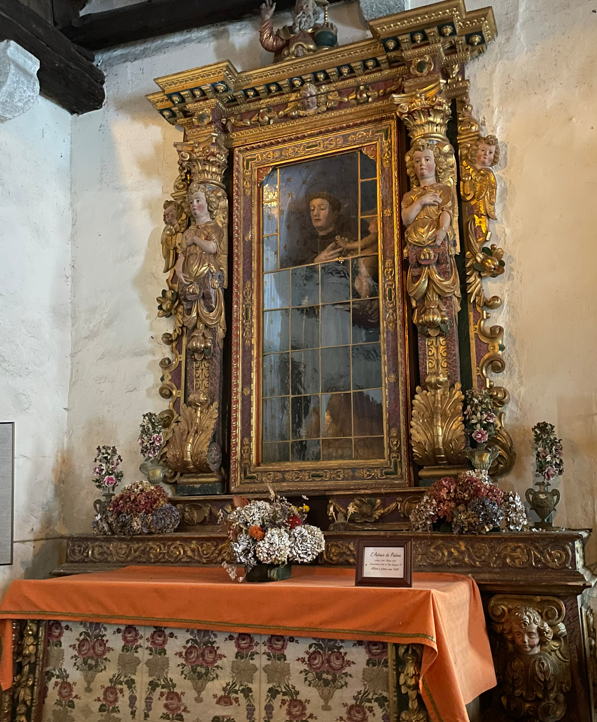
Altar dedicated to Saint Anthony of Padua in the Old Church

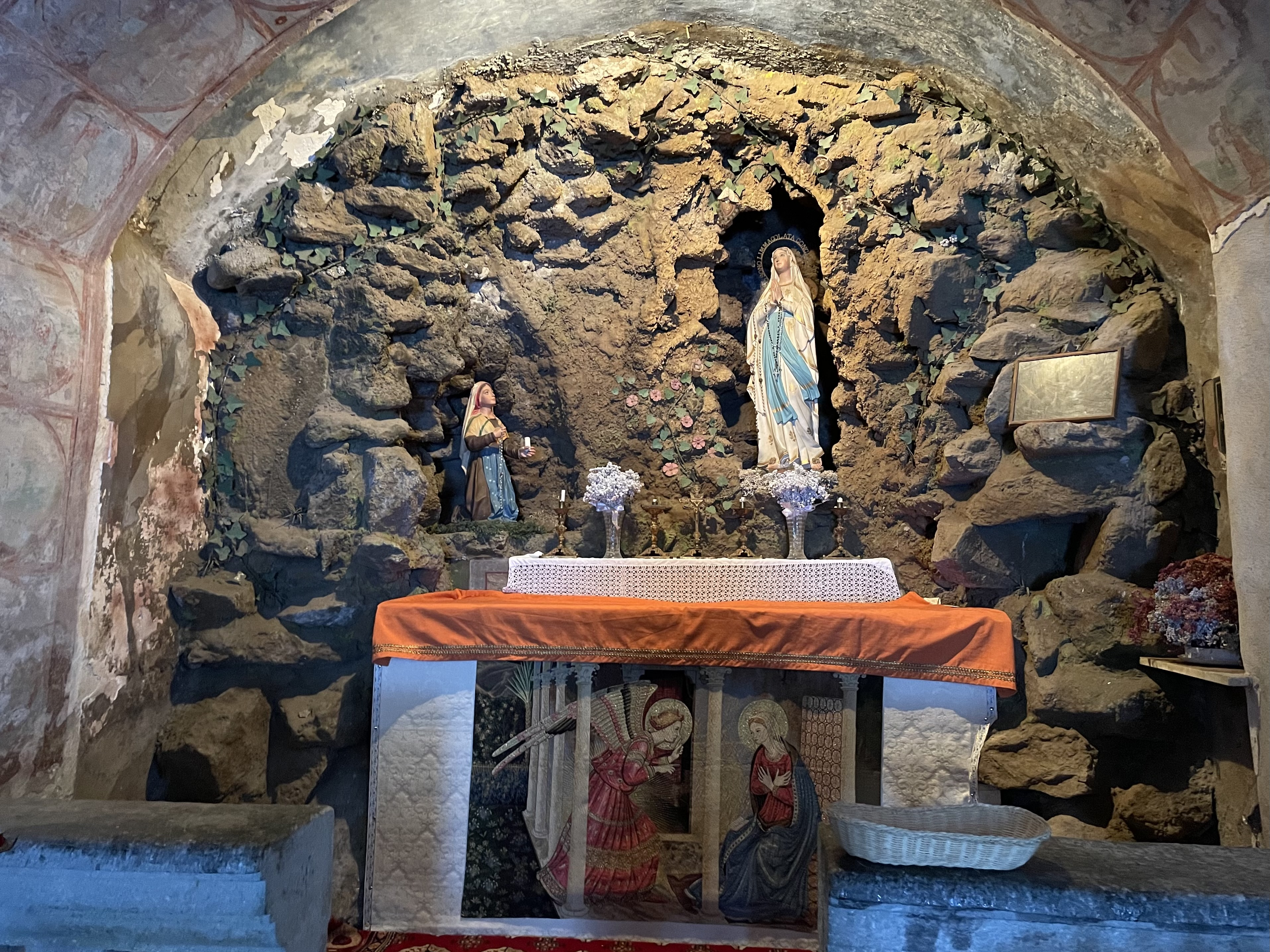
Grotto of Lourdes in the Old Church

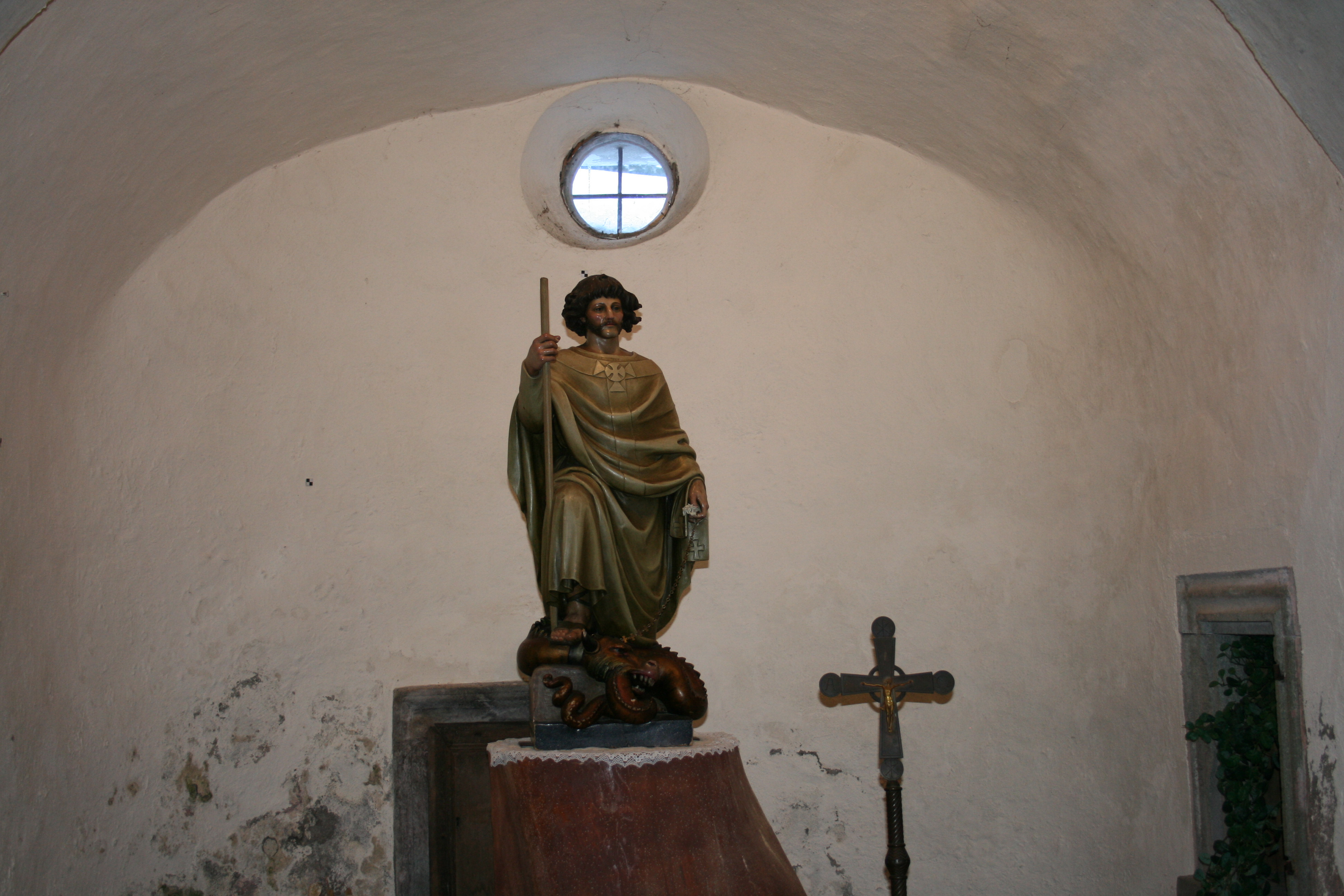
Chapel dedicated to Saint Bernard of Aosta in the Old Church

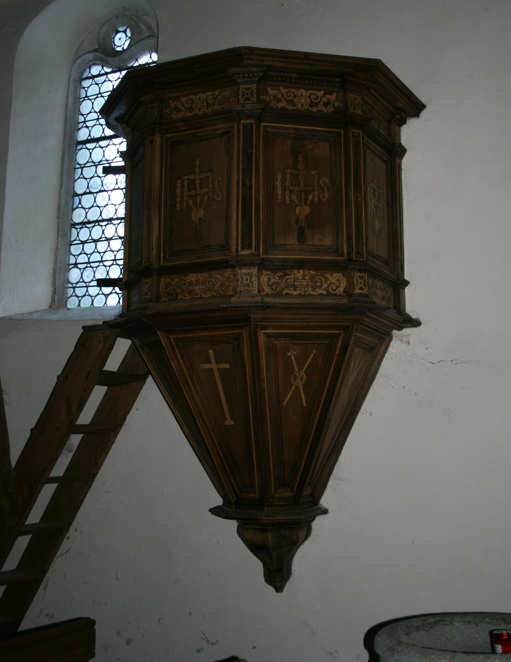
Wooden pulpit in the Old Church

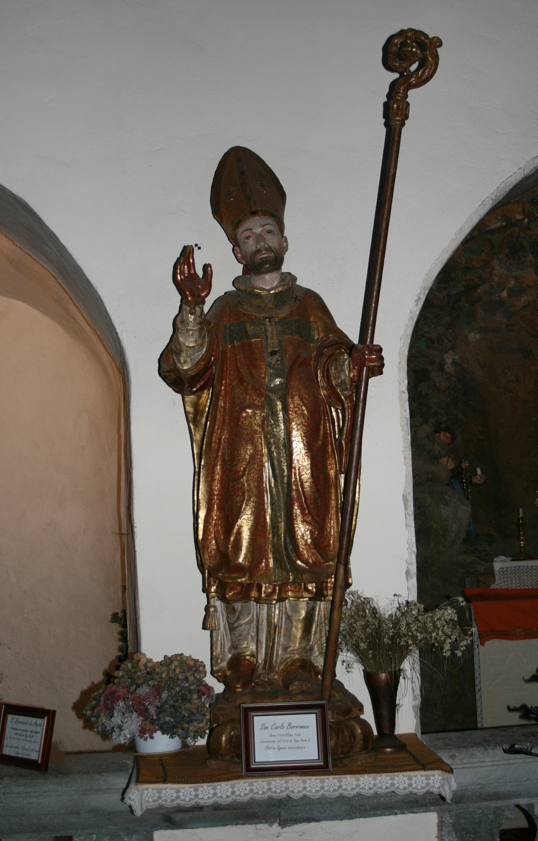
17th-century statue representing Saint Charles Borromeo in the Old Church

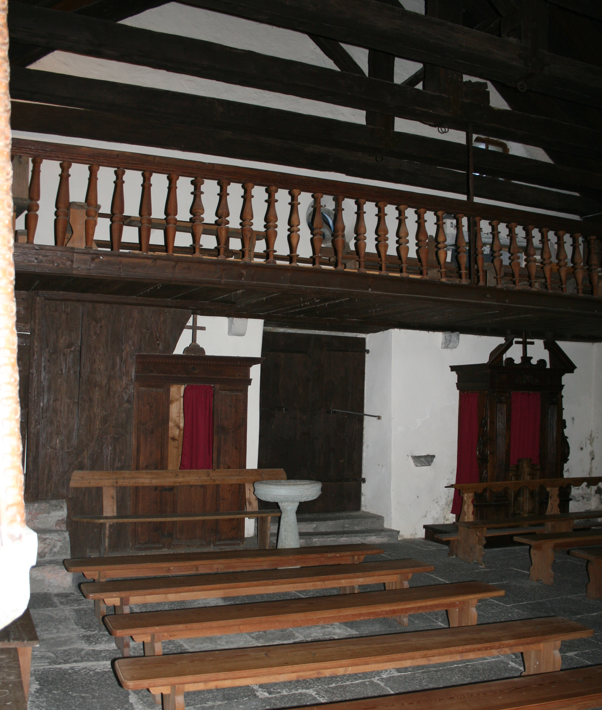
16th-century balcony in the Old Church

== Bell tower ==
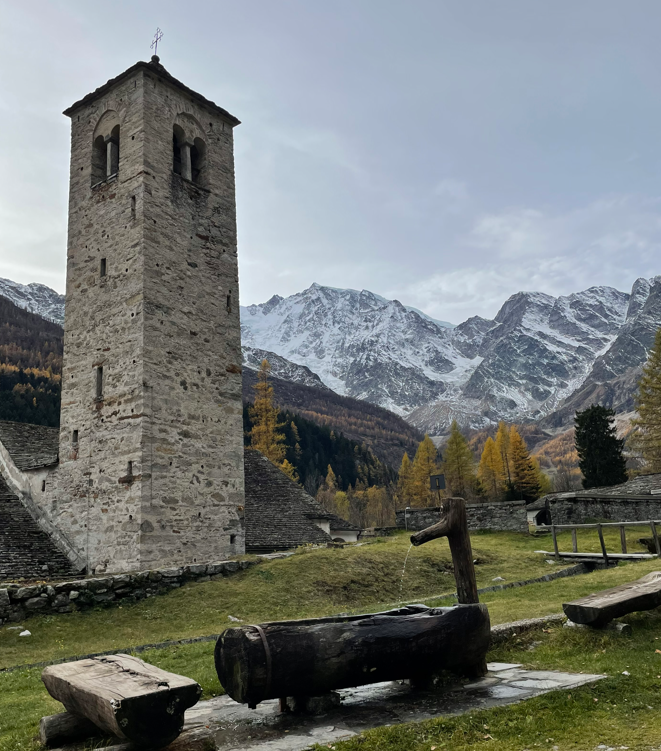
Bell tower of the Old Church

On the side of the presbytery is the access door to the bell tower. Construction of the current bell tower began in 1580, as a reconstruction of a smaller tower built on a side wall and not connected to the church. It was completed in 1594.

The belfry can be accessed from inside the church via a steep stone staircase. It currently has 4 bells, the oldest of which bears the date 1594. The other bells are more recent (from 1899, 1901, and 1981), since they were recast to replace bronzes that had deteriorated over time. Low temperatures make the metal fragile; consequently, during winter the bells can crack and lose their original timbre.

== Cemetery ==
=== History ===
In the Christian tradition, the suffrage of the dead led to the custom of burying the deceased near the church in a special place, called a camposanto, or cemetery.

In Macugnaga, the camposanto was placed next to the church, where the community gathered for prayers and other liturgical functions. It was initially placed around a local chapel, but with the construction of the Old Church, the cemetery was moved to the area around it, and was fenced-in to protect it from wandering beasts. It was marked by a high cross in the centre, and by the “carnerium": a building in the form of a chapel dedicated to Saint Michael the Archangel. The carnerium was where the deceased were deposited during the long and cold winter periods, since graves could not be dug in the frozen, snow-covered ground.

The cemetery was affected by the same vicissitudes of the Old Church: the flood of 1640, caused by the overflowing of the nearby Tambach, covered it with stones and gravel and completely devastated it. The local community considered transferring it next to the new parish church of Staffa in the first half of the 18th century. However, this project was not followed up, and the Old Church maintained its cemetery function for the village.

=== Renovation and enlargement ===
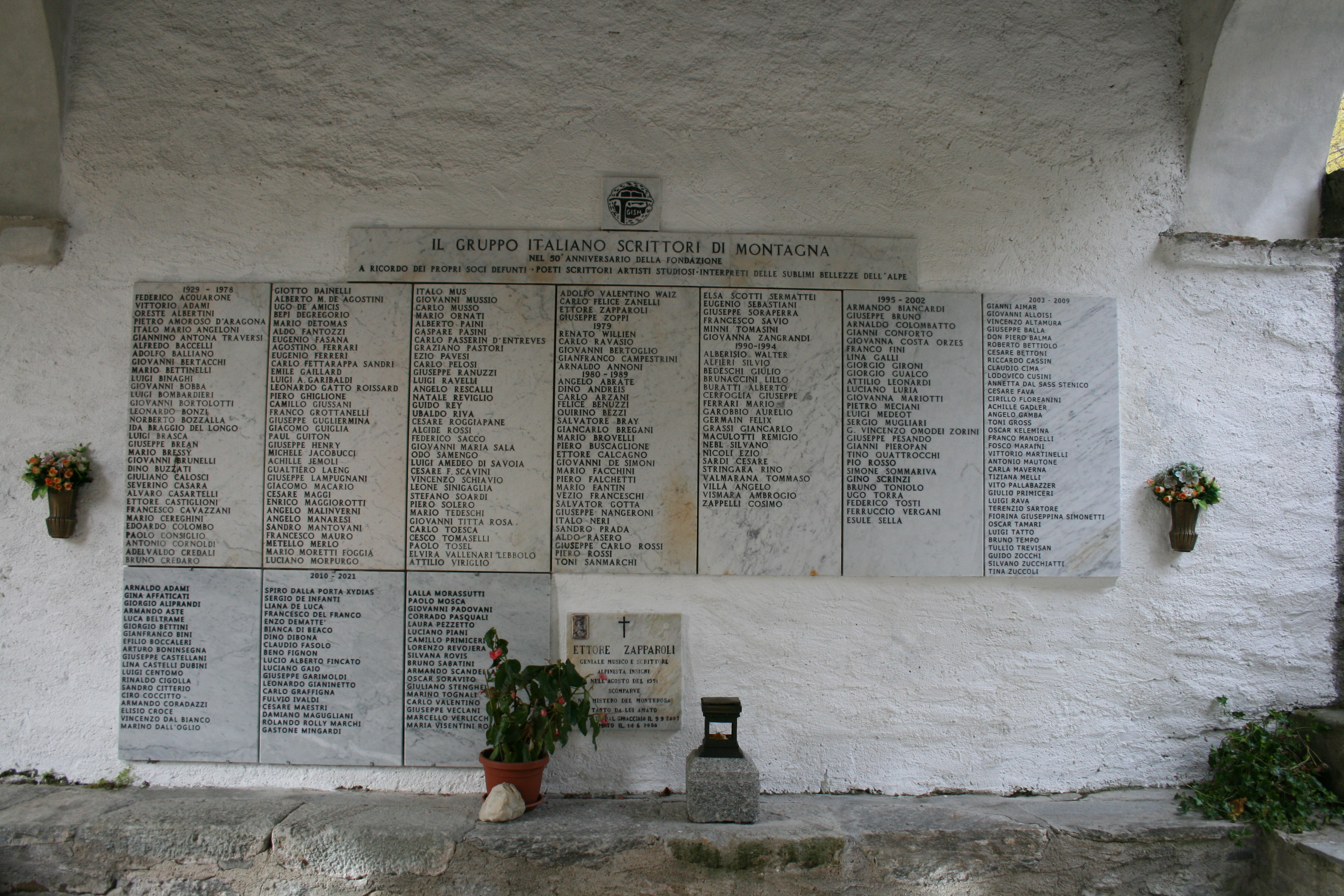
Marble plaque in honour of the "interpreters of the sublime heights of the alp", Old Church cemetery

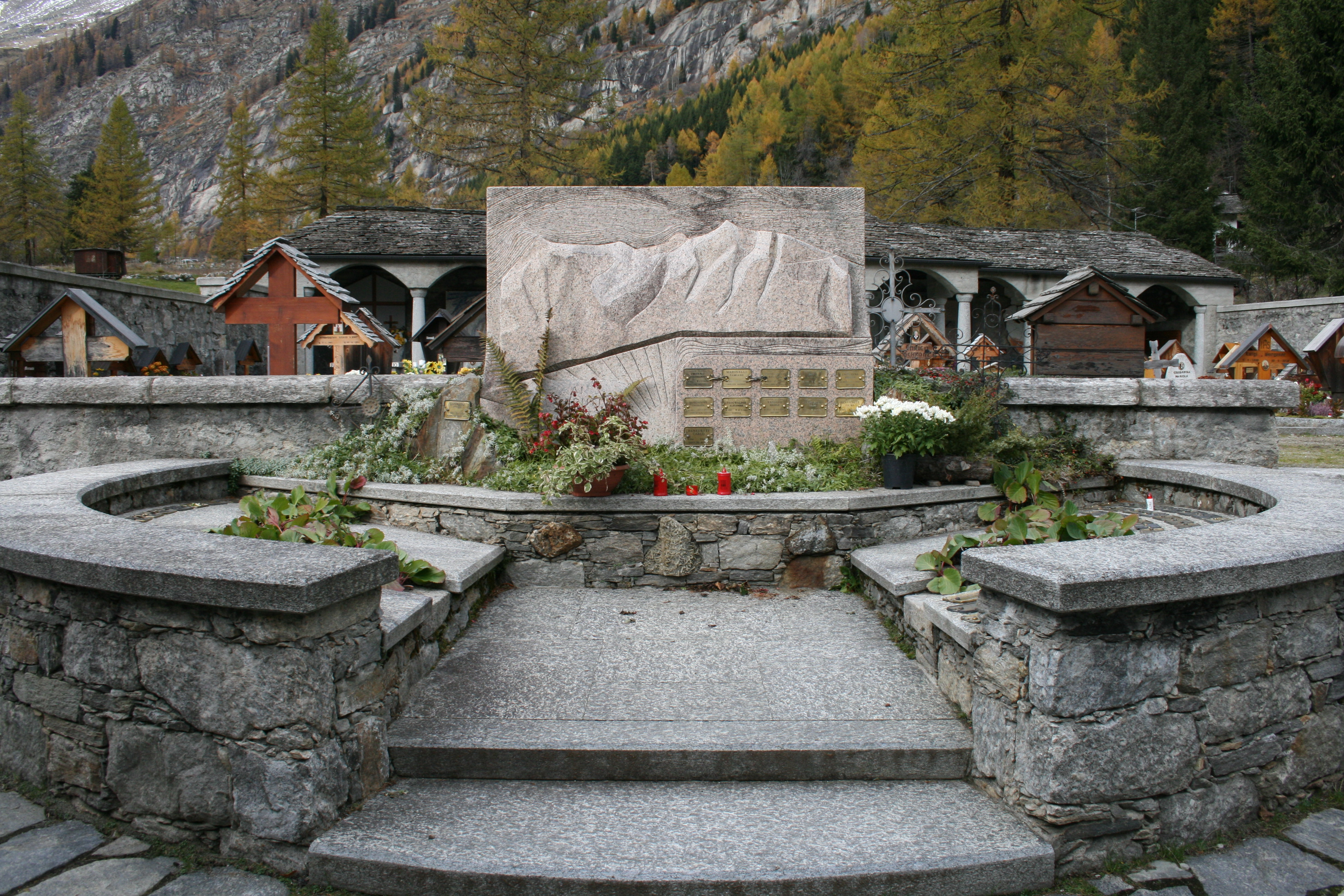
Monument in honour of mountaineers who died on Monte Rosa, Old Church cemetery

In 1749, a new ossuary was built behind the church, where a singular inscription can still be read today in which the dead recall the need to be remembered in prayer, complaining about the forgetfulness in which they are left: “Stop, o passenger, look at the torments /We are abandoned by our greedy relatives /Have pity on us, dear friends". In 1890, the cemetery area was enlarged by moving the eastern wall about 6 metres. The cemetery was also expanded westwards to occupy the hillock built to protect the church from any other possible flood of the Tambach.

A monument was erected to remember all the mountaineers who fell on Monte Rosa. A marble plaque, placed on the western wall of the porch, commemorates all those important personalities who are considered to be "interpreters of the sublime heights of the alp”, who loved Macugnaga and spread its name throughout the world.

=== Notable burials ===
A number of climbers (both Italian and foreign), painters, scholars, and writers are buried or commemorated in the Old Church cemetery in Macugnaga.

- Italian alpinist Damiano Marinelli was killed together with alpinist guides Battista Pedranzini and Ferdinand Imseng on 8 August 1881 due to an avalanche while climbing the Marinelli Couloir on the eastern side of Monte Rosa. The Rifugio Damiano Marinelli, built in the same area, is named after him.
- British academic W. P. Ker, Professor of Poetry at Oxford University and member of the Alpine Club, died in 1923 of a heart attack while ascending the Pizzo Bianco (a minor summit in the area) with British-Italian explorer Freya Stark.
- Gino Buscaini, born on 30 August 1931, was an Italian mountaineer, writer, mountaineer guide, and coordinator responsible for the Guida dei Monti d’Italia guidebooks for the Pennine Alps. Buscaini was so passionate about mountaineering that, together with his partner Silvia Metzeltin Buscaini, he explored mountains and places around the world. He published many books about his escalations, including Dolomites the 100 most beautiful ascents (Italian: Dolomiti le 100 più belle ascensioni), and Patagonia, magical land for travellers and alpinists (Patagonia, terra magica per viaggiatori e alpinisti). He was buried in 2002 in Macugnaga.
- Alpinist, writer, and musician Ettore Zapparoli went missing on the Monte Rosa in 1951, having spent many years exploring its eastern face. His remains were discovered by a climber in 2007, and he was finally buried in the cemetery in 2008.
- Swiss mountaineer and photographer Alexander Taugwalder, a member of the famous Taugwalder family, died on 26 June 1952, together with a friend and mountaineer colleague Adolf Schmutz, due to falling ice on the descent from Monte Rosa. He was buried in Macugnaga, as this was a common departure point for his 150 expeditions to the nearby mountains.
- Mario Moretti Foggia was an Italian painter, born in Mantua in 1882, who died in Macugnaga in 1954. He began his studies at the Academy of Fine Arts, Verona. He moved to Milan and continued studying at the Brera Academy following the teachings of Cesare Tallone. His artworks included mountain landscapes of the local Anzasca and Ossola valleys. He also exhibited his works abroad, especially those related to oriental themes he experienced during his journeys in the Middle East.
- Don Sisto Bighiani, born in 1920 in Ornavasso, was the parish priest of Macugnaga. During World War II, he was an active member of the Italian resistance movement. On 25 April 1945, the Liberation Day from the dominion of Nazi-fascists, Don Sisto Bighiani gave a speech in front of the crowd in Milan; in the same year, he was assigned to the parish of Macugnaga. He is also remembered for the construction of the Baita dei Congressi, a building to which Don Sisto contributed as a bricklayer, where he established the first Hotel Management School in Italy. Indeed, in the 1950s Bighiani was committed to assisting young people to exploit the expanding tourism development in the area. Furthermore, he was the first priest to obtain an alpinist guide license. He died in a car accident on 30 October 1979 and he was buried in the cemetery of the Old Church.
Gravestones and plaques in the Old Church Cemetery
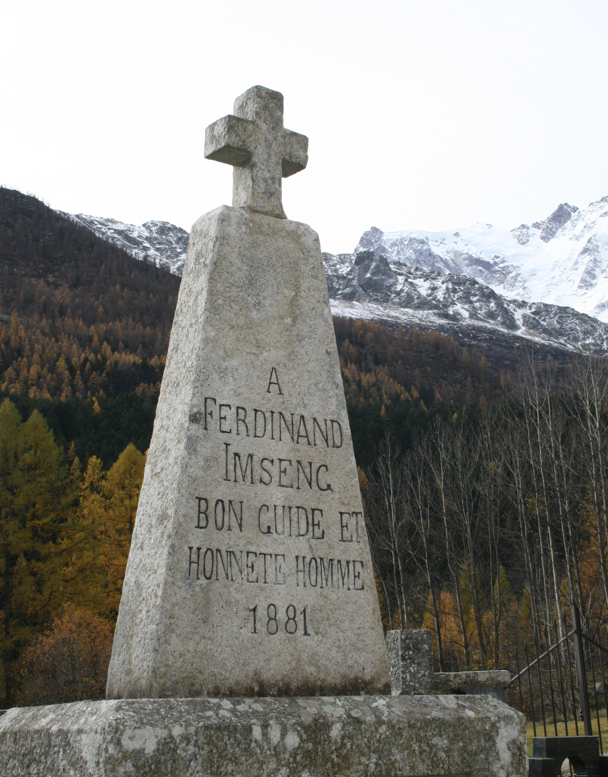
Ferdinand Imseng gravestone, Old Church cemetery

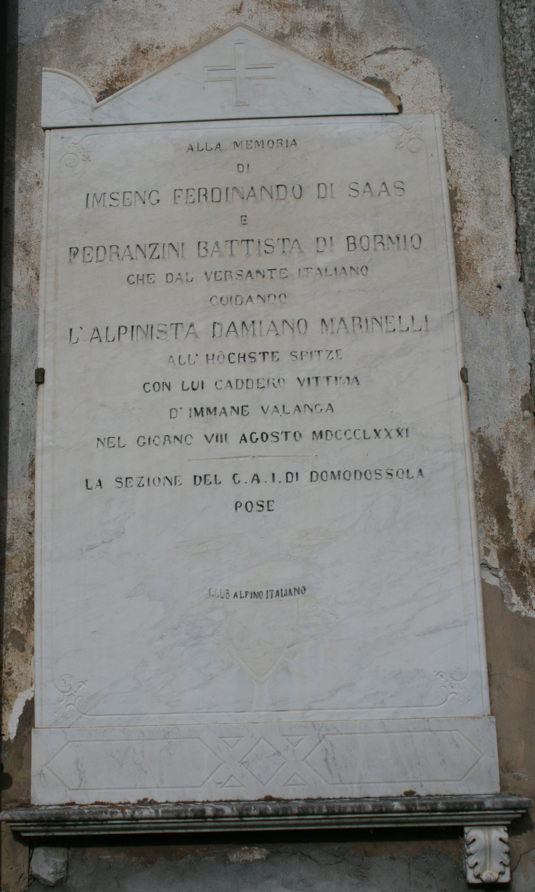
Plaque in honour of Ferdinand Imseng di Saas, Battista Pedranzini di Bormio e Damiano Marinelli, Old Church cemetery

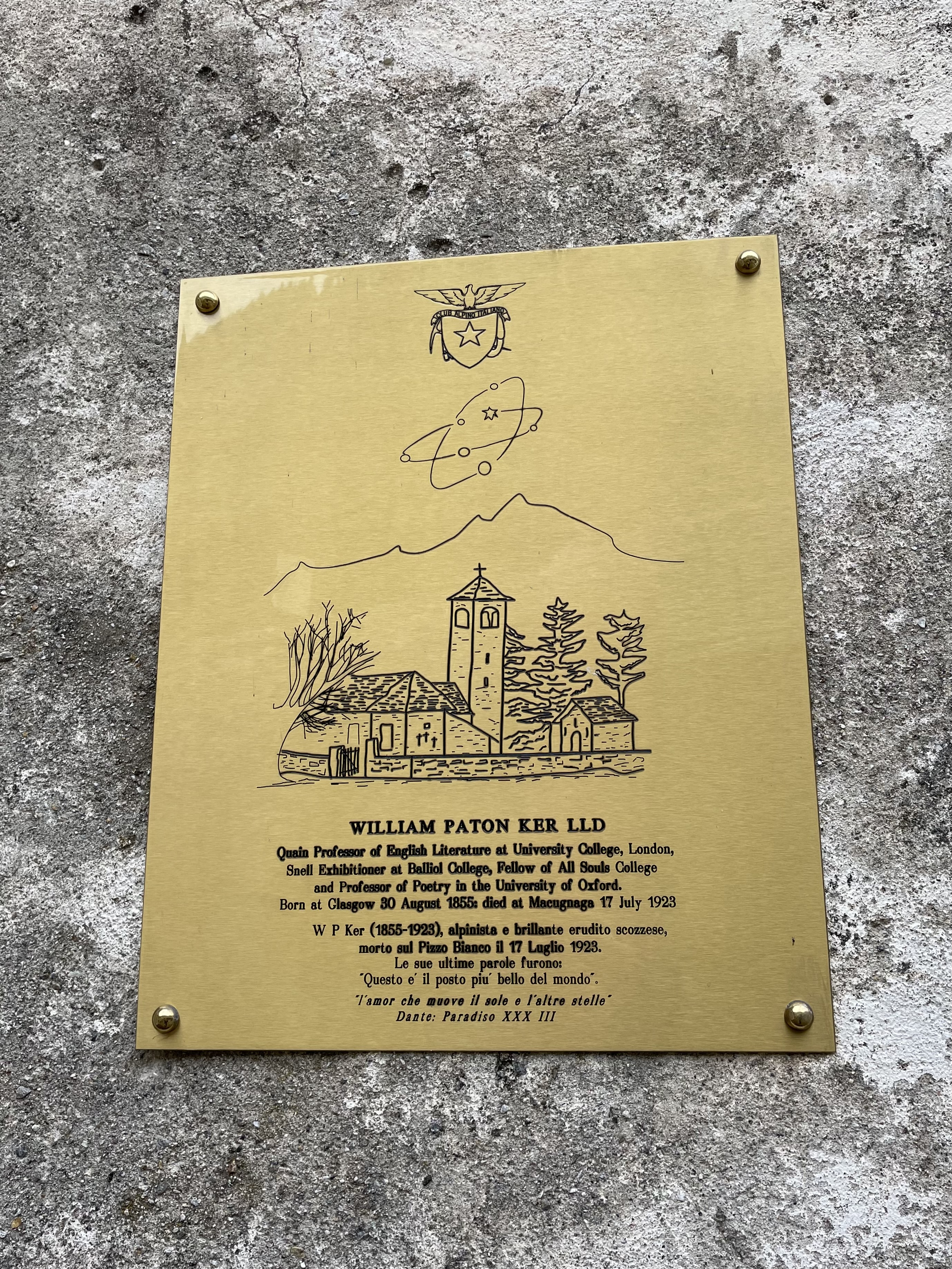
Plaque in honour of William Paton Ker, Old Church cemetery

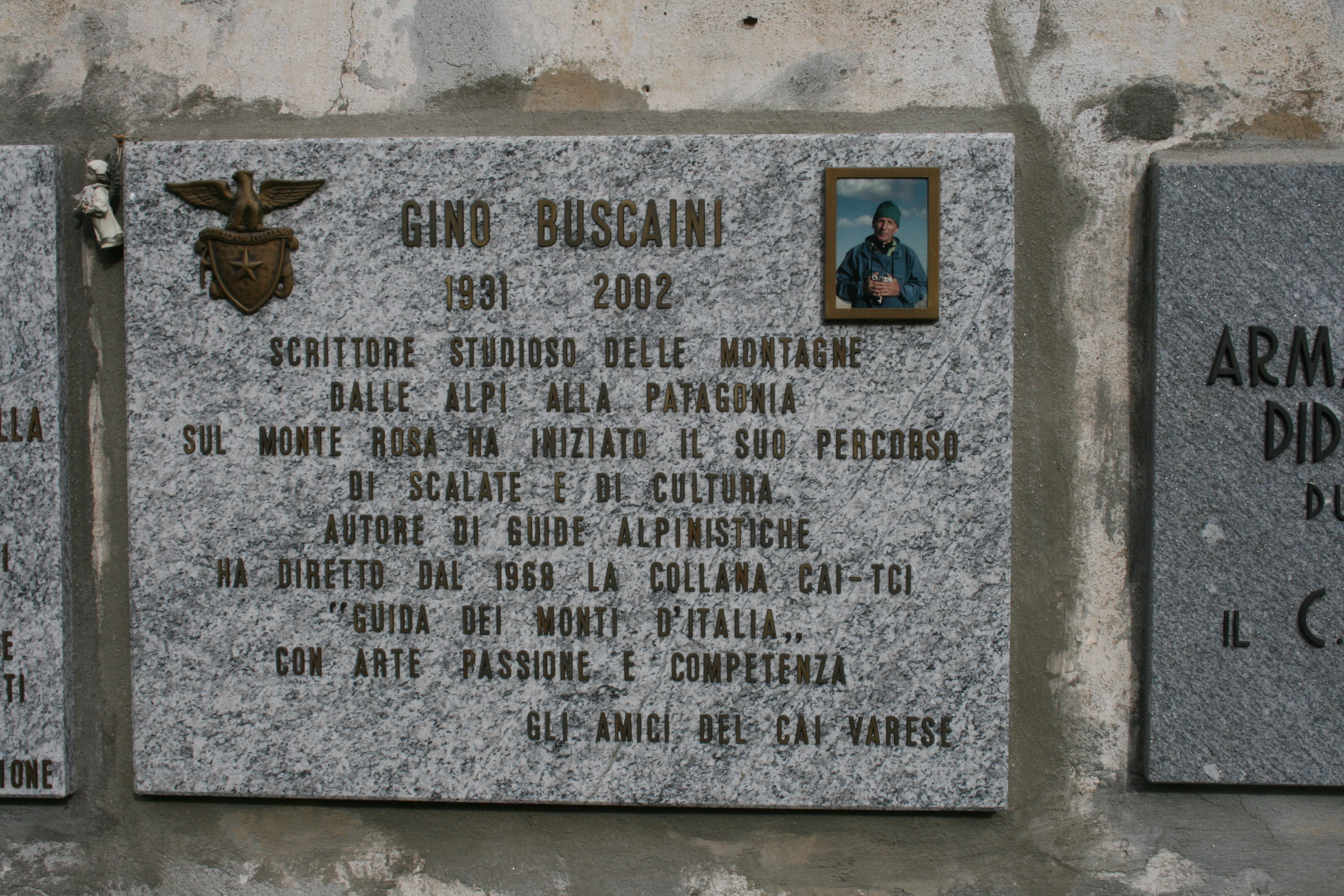
Gino Buscaini gravestone, Old Church cemetery

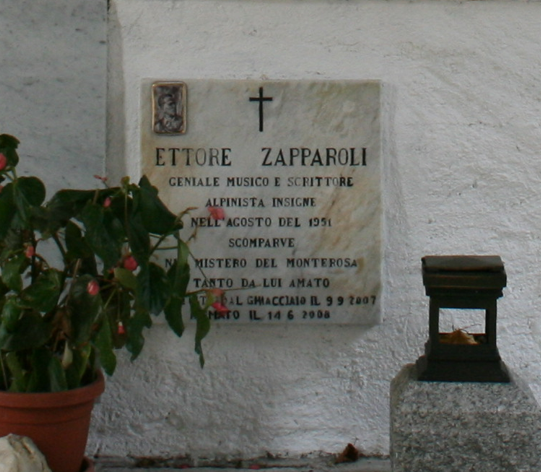
Ettore Zapparoli gravestone, Old Church cemetery

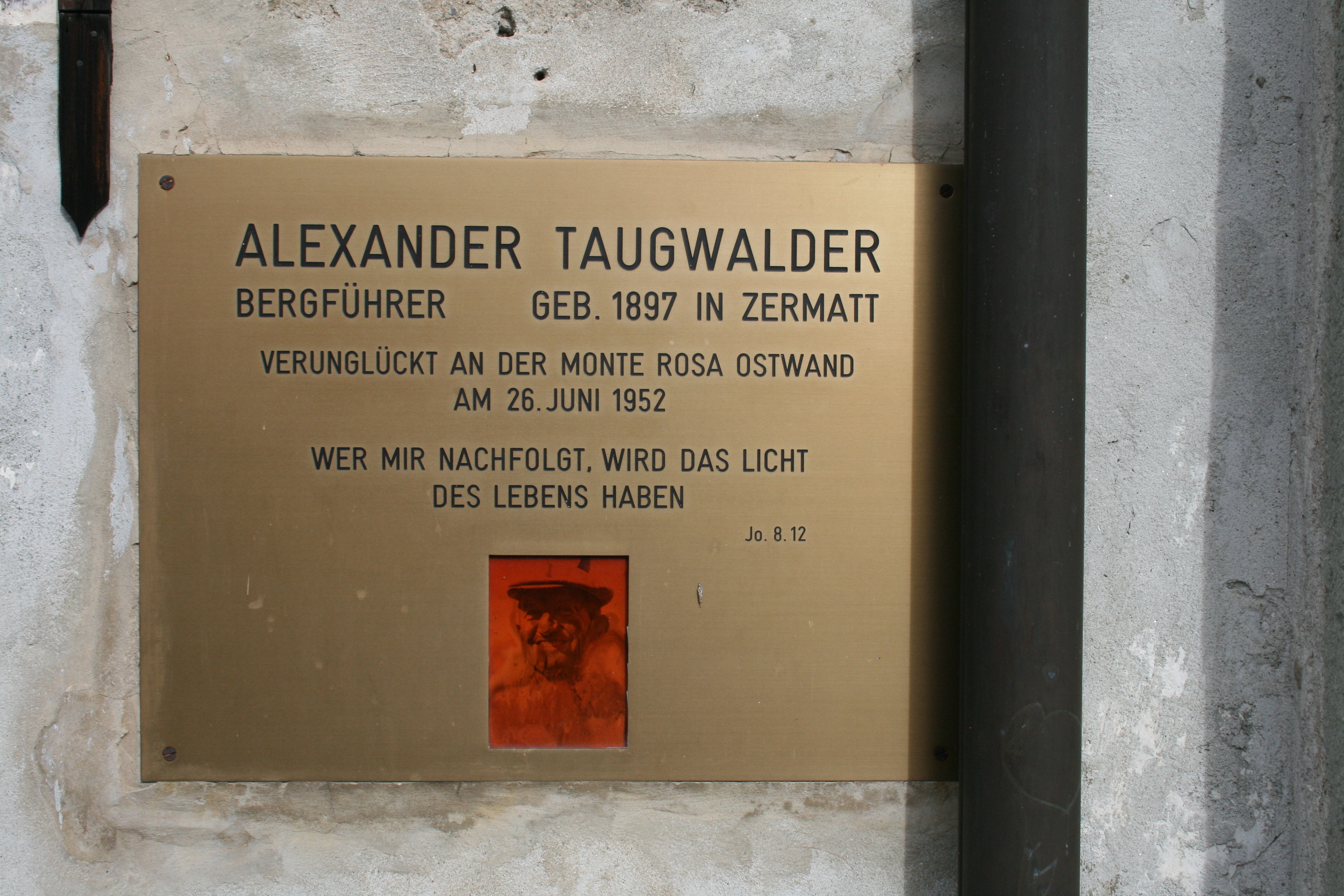
Alexander Taugwalder gravestone, Old Church cemetery

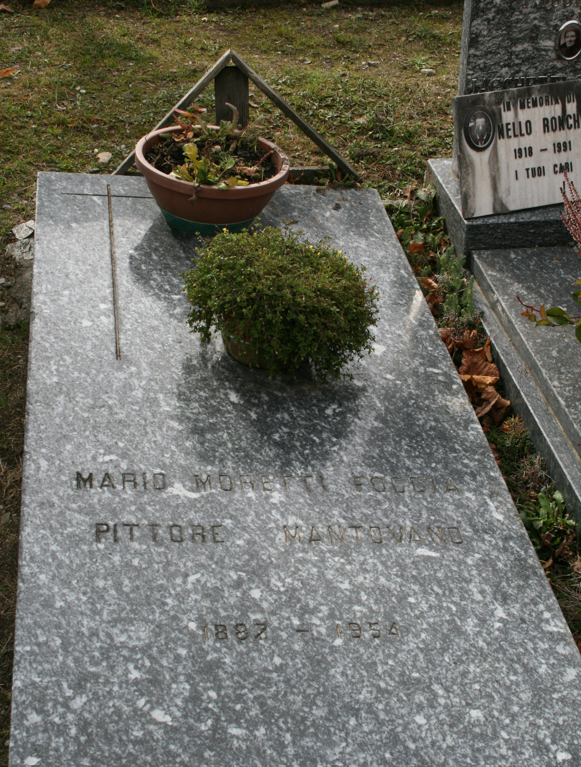
Mario Moretti Foggia gravestone, Old Church cemetery

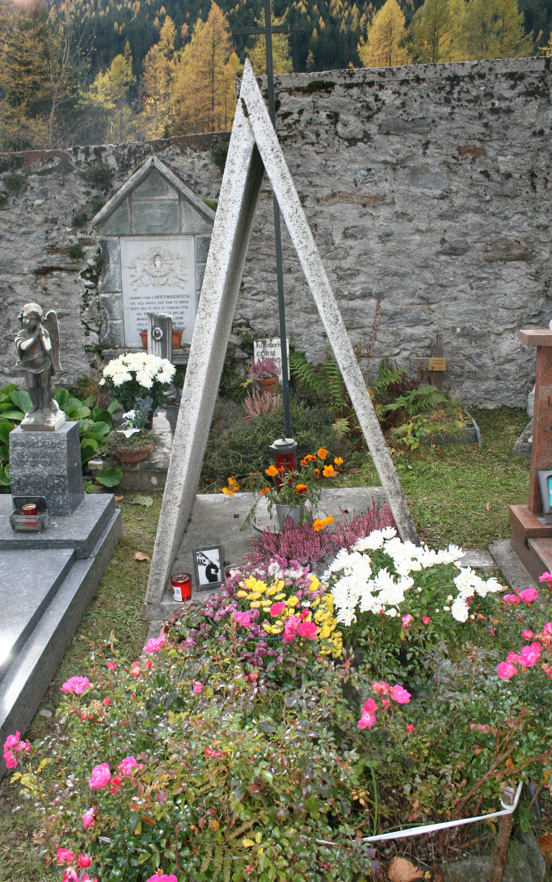
Don Sisto Bighiani gravestone, Old Church cemetery

== Old Linden Tree ==
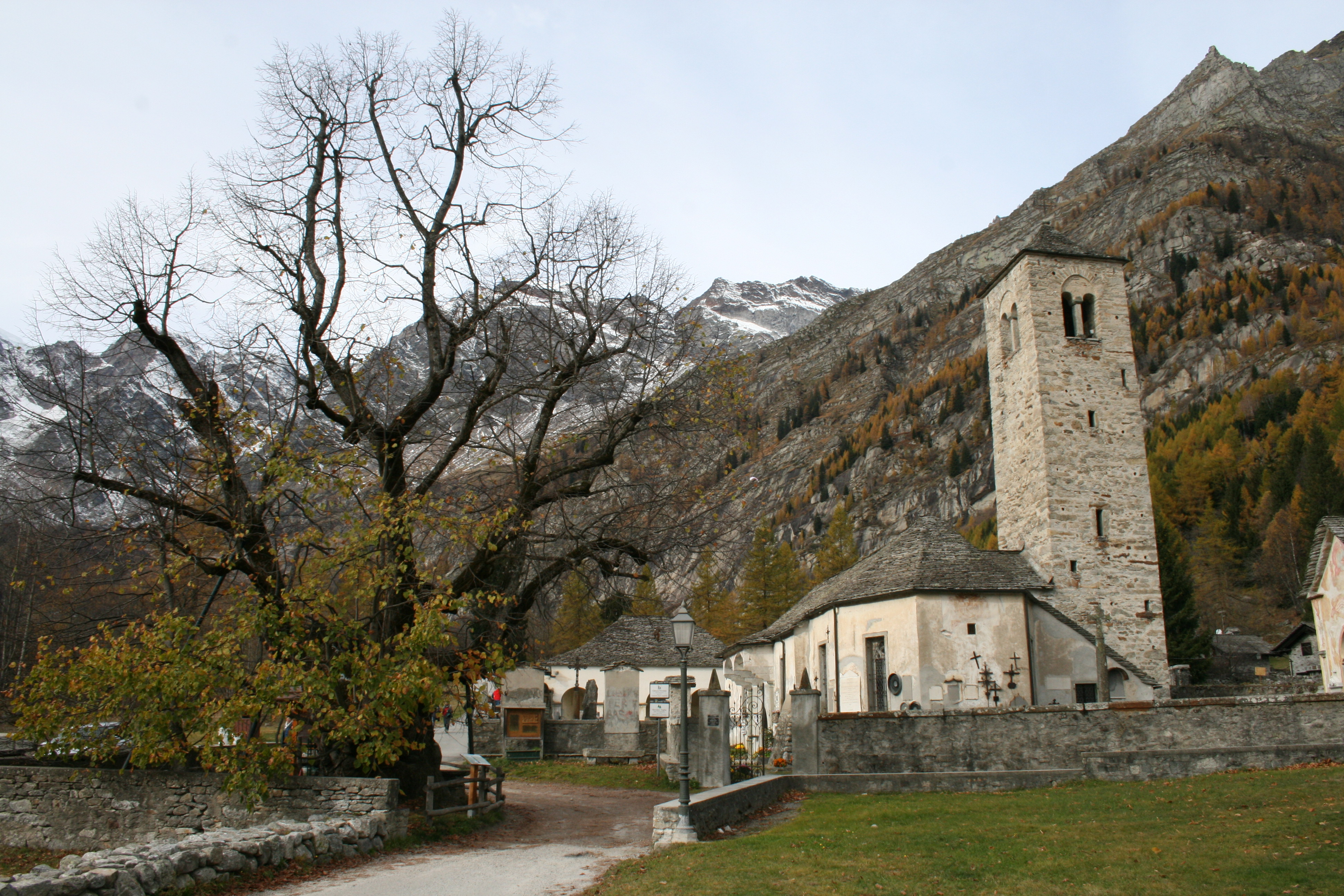
Old Linden Tree near Old Church

Near the Old Church and its cemetery is the Old Linden Tree (Alte Lindebum in the local Walser dialect), a symbol for the local community. In the past, it was a common practice to plant linden trees under which the community could gather. Indeed, this tree was used for judicial and administrative meetings by the Walser population, since it was considered to be a landmark for the entire community. Its dimensions are peculiar: a height of 15 meters and a circumference at the base of 8 meters.

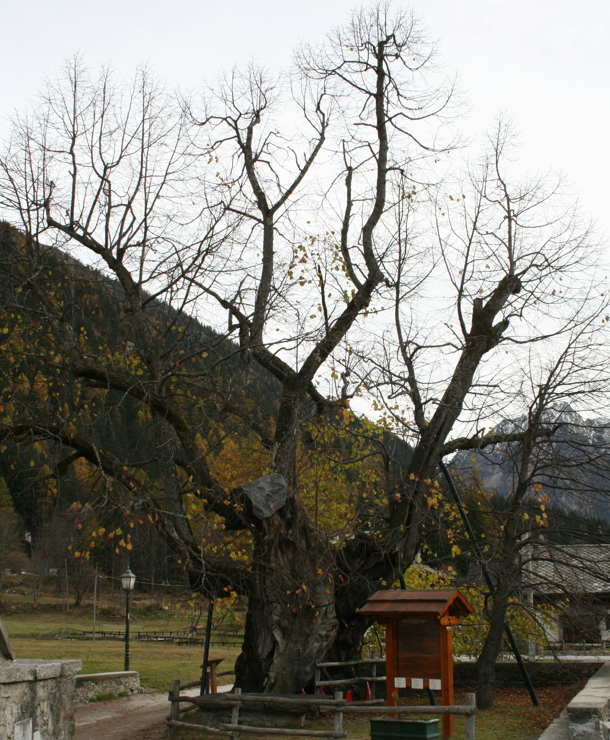
Old Linden Tree

Establishing the exact age of this authentic arboreal patriarch is difficult. According to a legend reported by the scholar Albert Schott in his book The German colonies in Piedmont, this linden tree was planted thanks to a seed brought from the Valais region in the second half of the 13th century by a woman who was part of the Walser founders of the village. This would give the tree an age of almost 800 years. A scientific commission of the University of Turin credited it with an age of around 500 years, based on the external size. It was impossible to carry out a scientific study with the precise measurement of the age since the trunk, inside, was empty. According to the experts of the Piedmont Region, however, the linden tree is 200 years old; this roughly agrees with the age suggested by the local historian don Tullio Bertamini, who in 1999 controversially determined the tree to be only half its suspected age. In reality, an age of 200 years is historically inadequate, given that in 1825 the linden appears in a painting by the English painter William Brockedon. Furthermore, a few years later, in 1859, the English traveller Lady Cole (in her book A Lady's tour round Monte Rosa) defined the linden tree as "large and magnificent", adjectives difficult to attribute if the tree had been young.

== Legends and myths ==
There are many legends and myths related to the Old Church and its cemetery that trace back to the Walser community which used to live in Macugnaga. Their main features, such as the strict relationship between the real and spiritual world and the supernatural elements, are common to Germanic culture.

=== Bregnala and Strechala ===
According to this legend, when the Tambach overflowed in 1640, inundating the entire plain surrounding the Dorf, two witches named Bregnala and Strechala worked hard to bury the whole church under the landslide. However, they failed because the Blessed Mary of the Assumption (to whom the church was dedicated) intervened to save the building, which therefore remained almost intact.

=== The monk soothsayer ===
This legend takes place in 1698 when the bishop of Novara, worried that floods and avalanches could hit the Old Church again, gave the order to look for a safer place where to build a new parish church. The population of Macugnaga was deeply split on the choice of the place. To resolve the matter fairly, a monk named Lorenzo organized a procession in which he participated blindfolded and carried a cross in his hand that he was going to plant in the place approved by God for the construction of the new parish church. That is how the community chose the place where to build the new parish church.

There is a malicious claim that it was not an enlightenment of God that made the monk choose that particular place, but that an inhabitant of Staffa, who had previously agreed on the place with the monk, pinched him to make him understand he had arrived at the point where to stop and plant the cross.

=== The mountain guide ===
According to this legend, a woman used to go every day to the Old Church to say a prayer for the deceased buried in the cemetery. One evening, she heard the noise of ice axes and mountain pitons beating behind her back. She turned and she saw, on the grave of an English mountaineer who had died on Monte Rosa a few years earlier, the severed head of a mountain guide she knew very well. She ran back home, thinking that something sinister was going to happen. The next day, that mountain guide died during a climb, hit by a stone on the head.

=== The count of the dead ===
According to this legend, the first day of November is the day of celebration for the dead, who can return to visit the places where they used to live. Before going to visit their own homes, the deceased of Macugnaga gather in the Old Church, near the cemetery, to participate together with the population in the suffrage functions. Once these are finished and the members of the religious community return to their homes, the dead stay a little longer to count those who are going to die the following year. One year, a middle-aged man, overcome by curiosity, decided to listen to the names of fellow villagers who were going to die in the following year. He hid behind the altar, where he listened to the names, until one of the dead added that also the man hidden behind the altar would die the following year; and so it happened.

=== The woman without candlelight ===
On 2 November, the bell of the Old Church played its five usual strokes to announce the start of the function in commemoration of the dead. A local woman hurried to the church to attend the service, carrying a lantern to light the path. A gust of wind blew out the candle that burned in the lantern. Luckily, she saw a procession of people equipped with lights coming towards her. Thinking they were miners who were going to the mine, she stopped one of them and kindly asked him to light her candle. He gave her the stub of a candle, with which she lighted her lantern, and then she pocketed it. The following day she checked her pocket and discovered that what she believed to be a candle stub was actually a man's finger.

== Gallery ==
Panoramic views of the Old Church and its cemetery
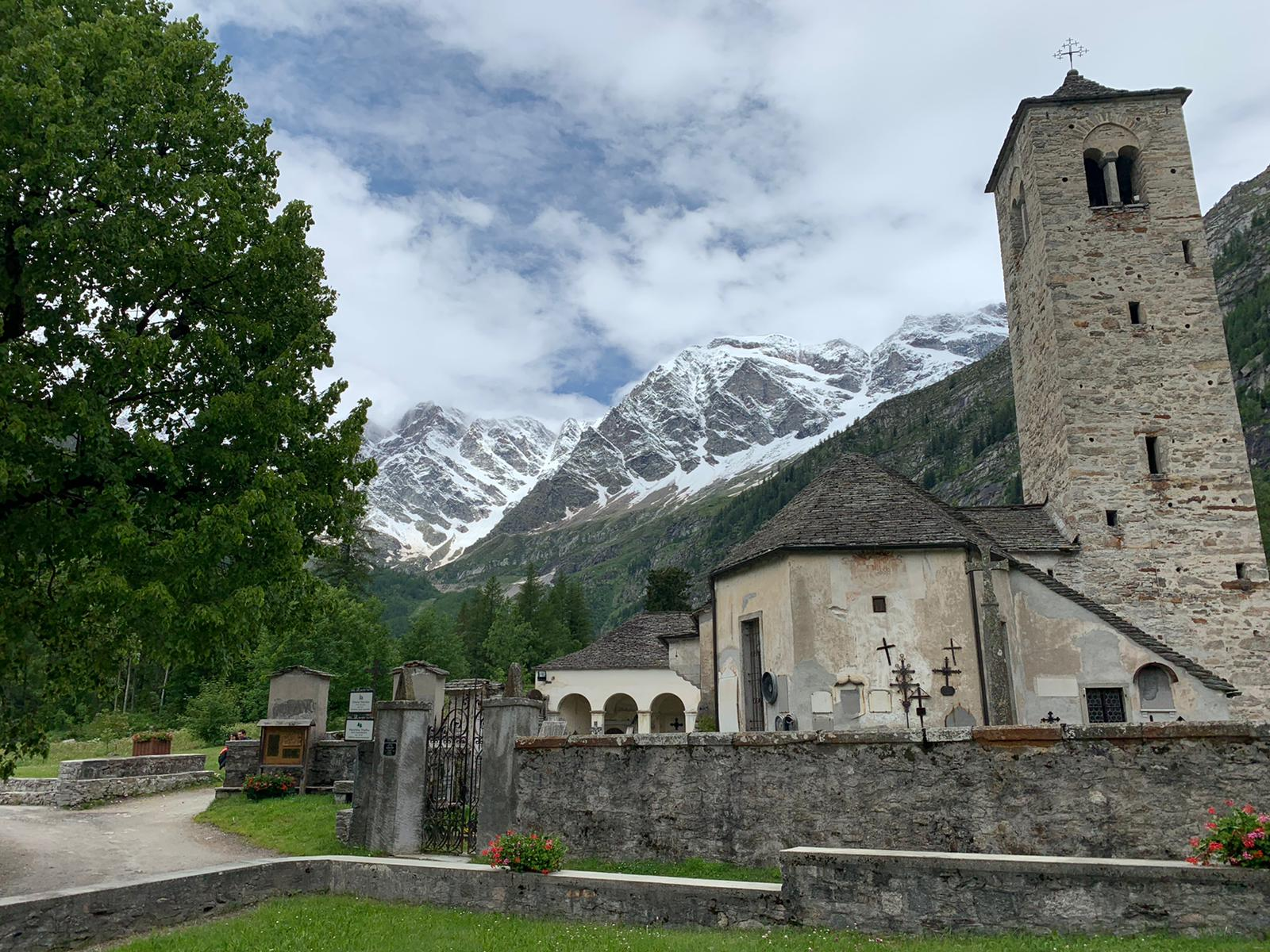
Old Church and the east wall of Monte Rosa

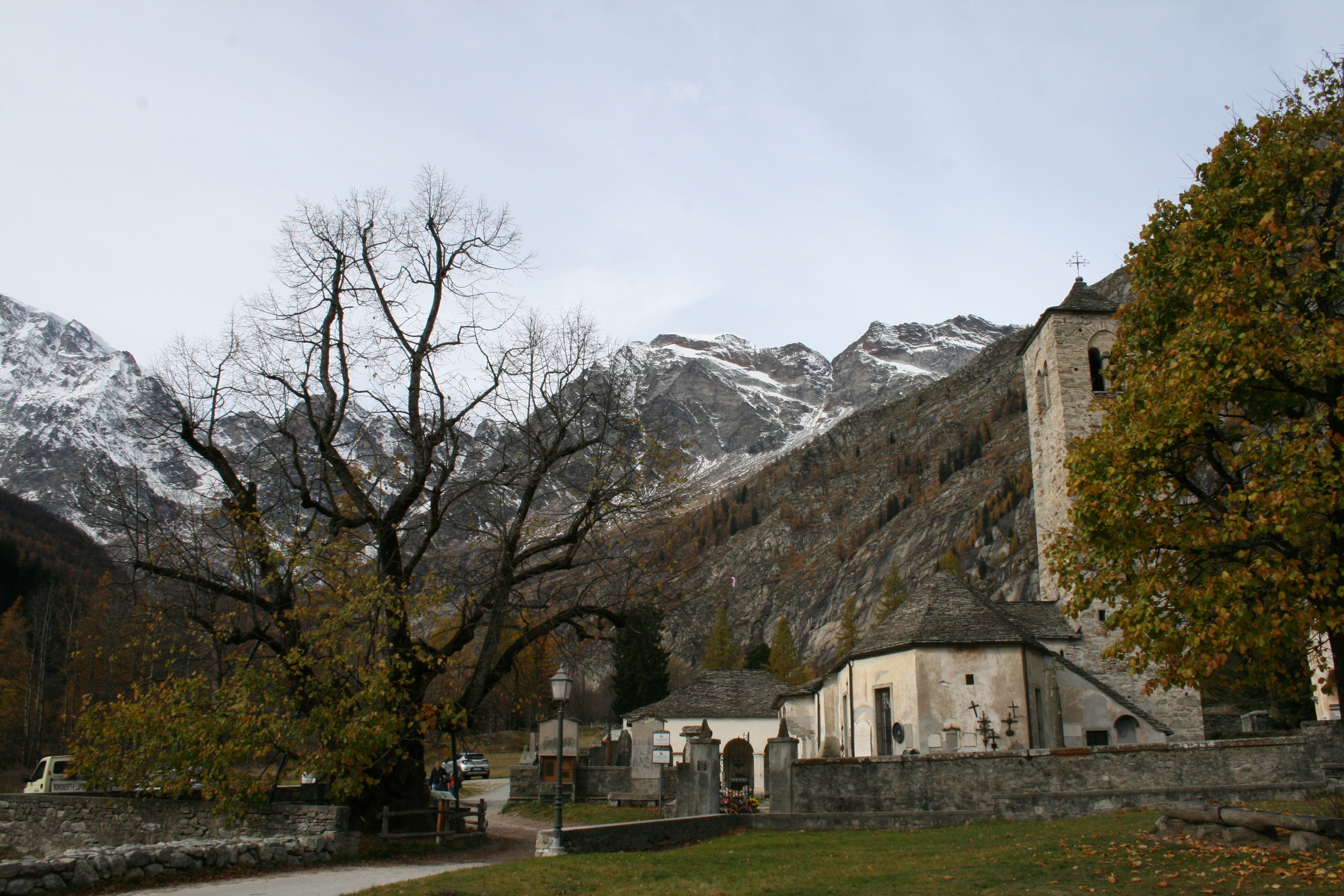
Old Church and Old Linden Tree with the east wall of Monte Rosa in the background

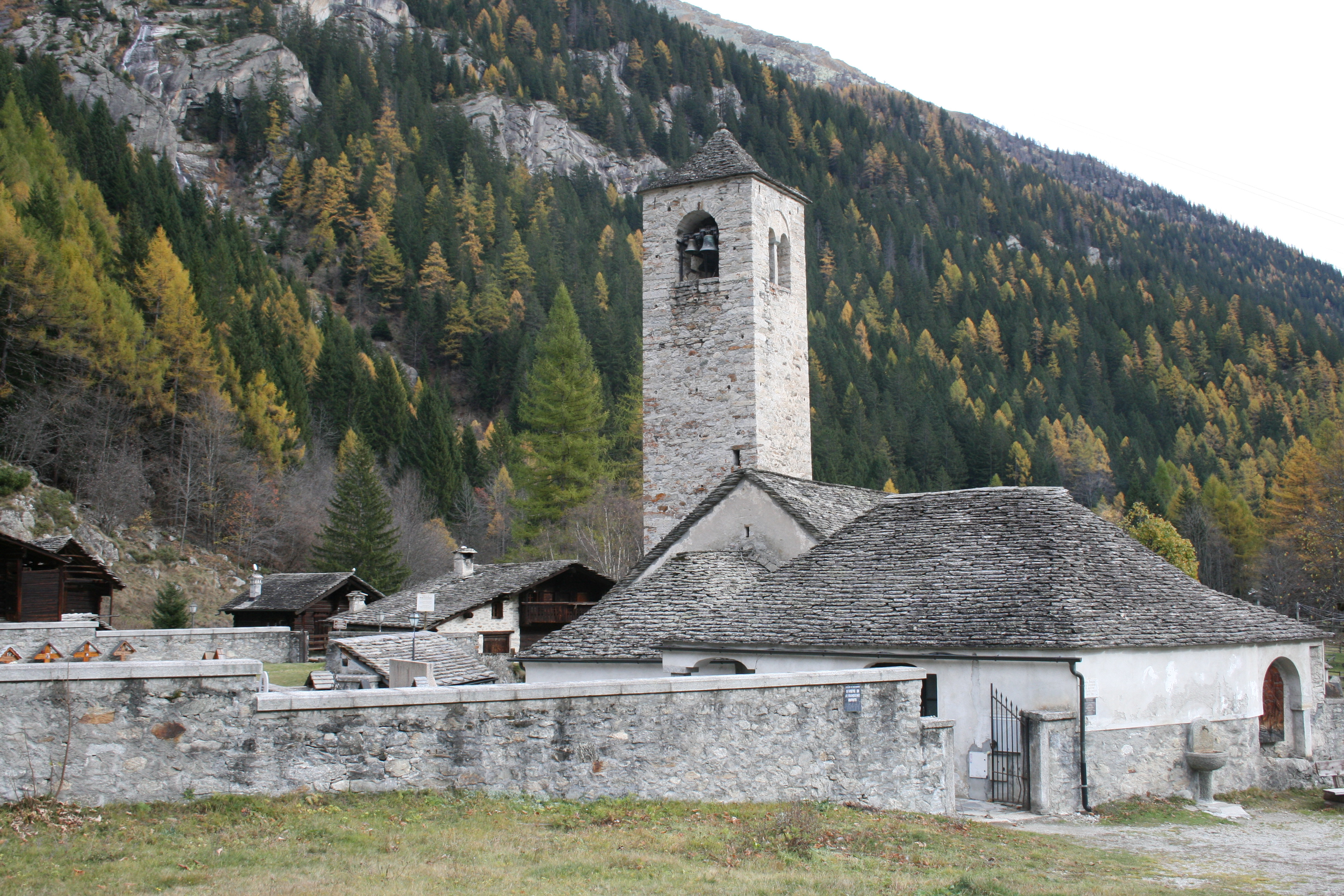
Old Church

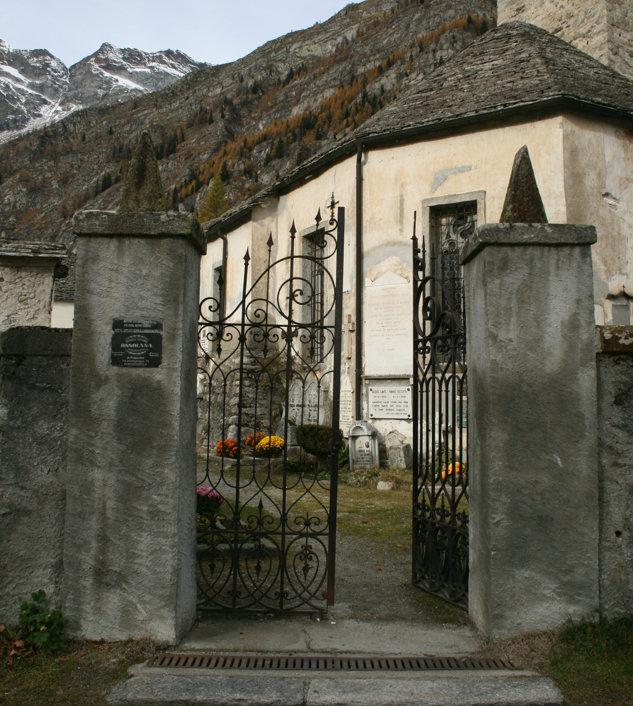
Old Church cemetery entrance gate

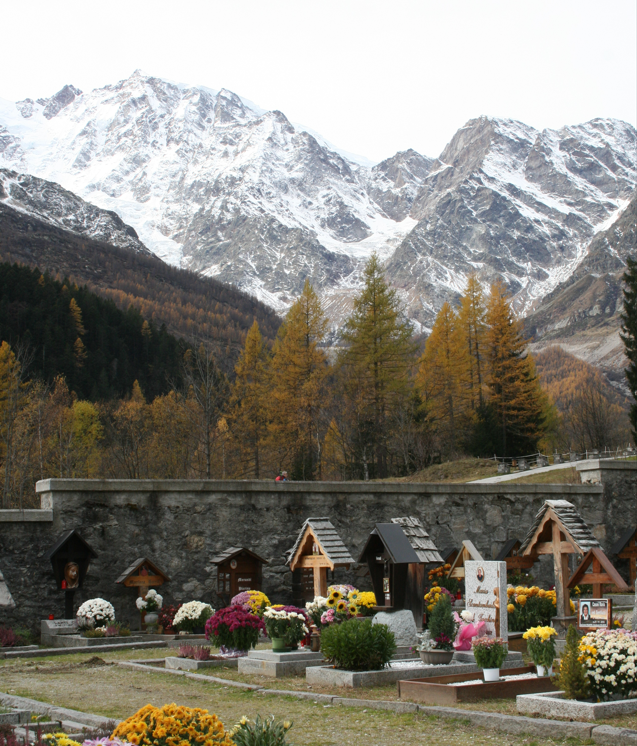
Old Church cemetery surrounded by Monte Rosa

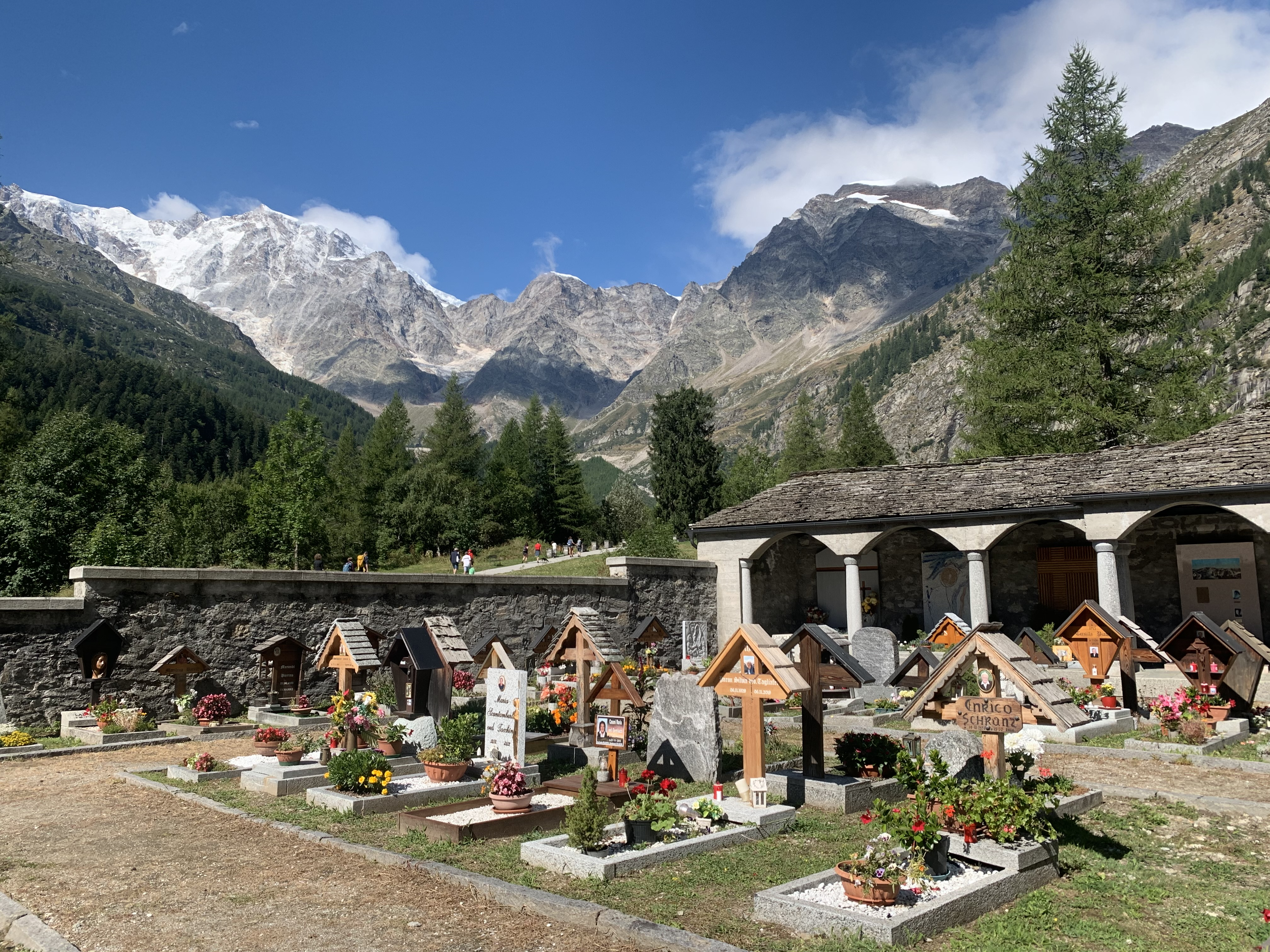
Old Church cemetery graves surrounded by the east wall of Monte Rosa

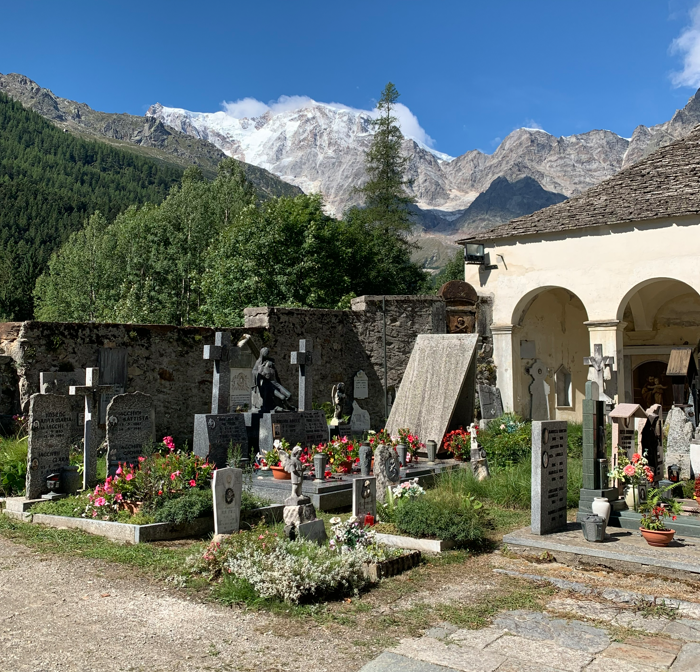
Old Church cemetery graves

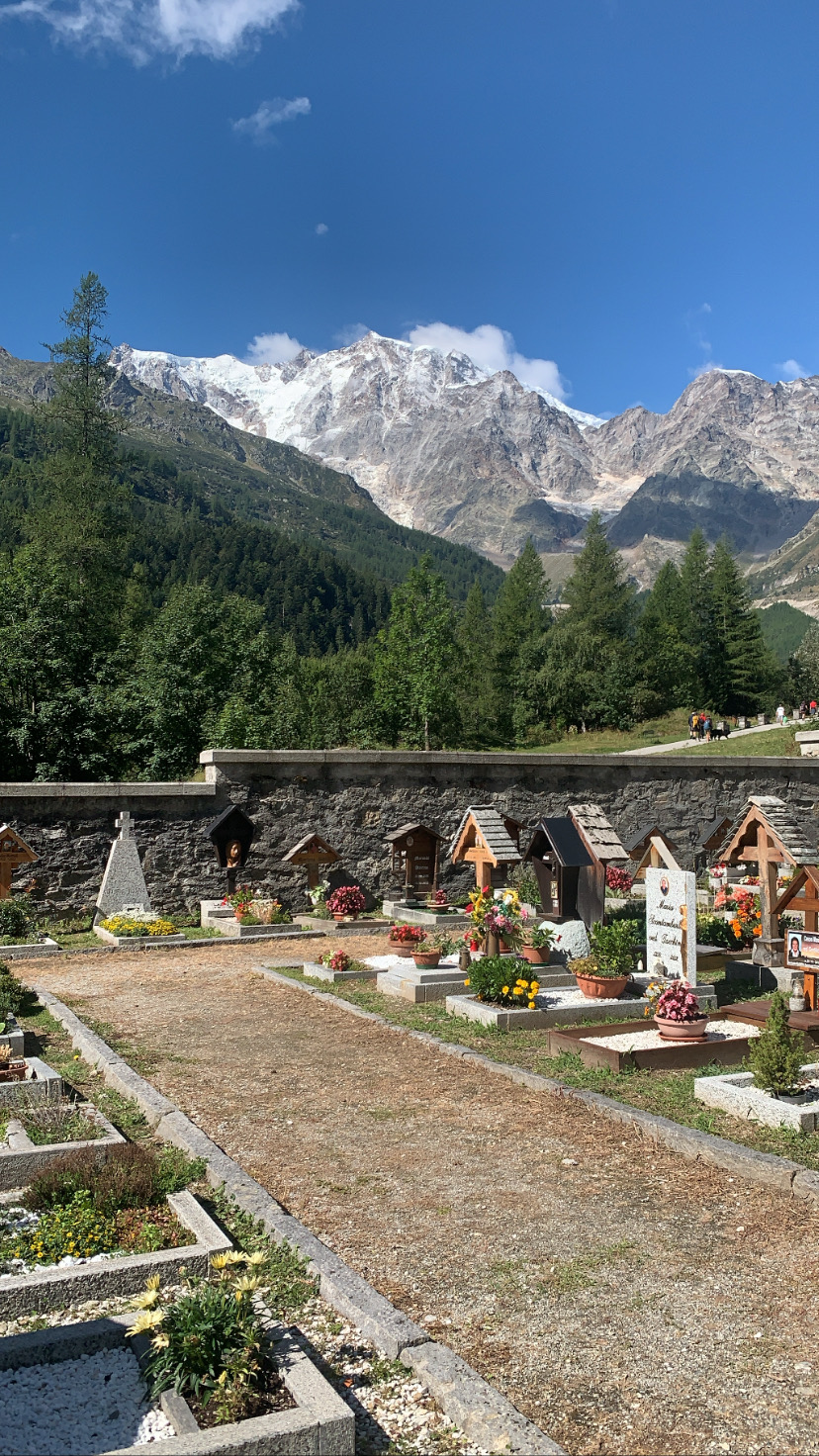
Old Church cemetery with the east wall of Monte Rosa in the background

== See also ==
- Ossola
- Roman Catholic Diocese of Novara
