= W. P. Ker =

Scottish literary scholar and essayist (1855–1923)

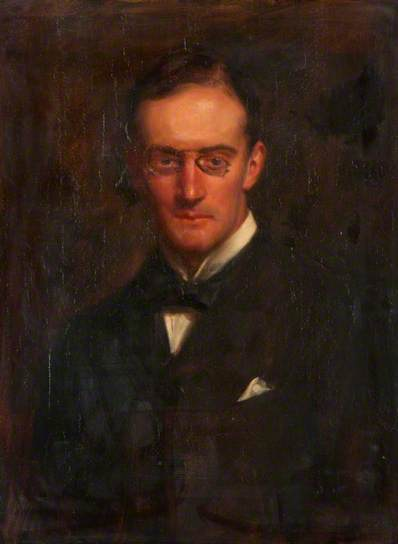
Portrait of William Paton Ker, oil on canvas by Sir Johnstone Forbes-Robertson

William Paton Ker, FBA (30 August 1855 – 17 July 1923), was a Scottish literary scholar and essayist.

== Life ==
Born in Glasgow in 1855, Ker studied at Glasgow Academy, the University of Glasgow, and Balliol College, Oxford.

He was appointed to a fellowship at All Souls College, Oxford, in 1879. He became Professor of English Literature and History at the University College of South Wales, Cardiff, in 1883, and moved to University College London as Quain Professor in 1889. He retained, however, his links with Oxford and was there almost every week during the 1910s, making himself available to keen students there. He was later the Oxford Professor of Poetry from 1920 to his death, at 67, of a heart attack while climbing the Pizzo Bianco (a summit near Macugnaga in northern Italy). A plaque commemorates his death in the Old Church cemetery in Macugnaga. A W. P. Ker Memorial Lecture is held at Glasgow University in his honour.

== Influence ==
He is referred to repeatedly in J. R. R. Tolkien's essay Beowulf: The Monsters and the Critics. W. H. Auden's discovery of Ker was a turning point:

"... what good angel lured me into Blackwell's one afternoon and, from such a wilderness of volumes, picked out for me the essays of W. P. Ker? No other critic whom I have subsequently read could have granted me the same vision of a kind of literary All Souls Night in which the dead, the living and the unborn writers of every age and tongue were seen as engaged upon a common, noble and civilizing task. No other could have so instantaneously aroused in me a fascination with prosody, which I have never lost."

== Works ==
- Epic and Romance: Essays on Medieval Literature (1897; second edition 1908)
- The Dark Ages (Edinburgh: Blackwood, 1904).
- Sturla the Historian (1st ed.), Oxford: Clarendon Press, 1906, Wikidata Q19069364
- Tennyson: the Leslie Stephen lecture: Delivered in the senate house, cambridge on 11 November 1909 (1st ed.), Cambridge: Cambridge University Press, 1909, Wikidata Q107398701
- "Browning". Essays and studies: by members of the English Association. 1: 70–84. 1905. ISSN 1359-1746. Wikidata Q107801431.
- English Literature; Medieval (1912) – also known as Medieval English literature
- Two Essays (1918)
- Sir Walter Scott (1919)
- The Art of Poetry (1923)
- Collected Essays (1925)
- Form And Style In Poetry (1928)
- On Modern Literature (1955)
- Collected Essays (1968) edited by Charles Whibley
