= Carcoforo =

- Comune
- Comune di Carcoforo
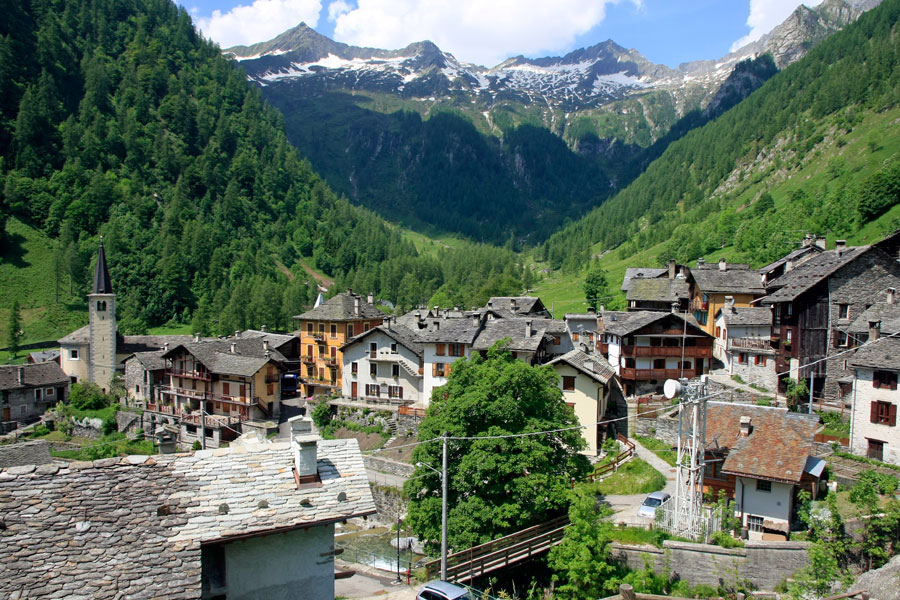

- Location within Italy Location within Piedmont
- Coordinates: 45°54′N 8°3′E
- Country: Italy
- Region: Piedmont
- Province: Vercelli (VC)

Government
  - Mayor: Marino Sesone

Area
  - Total: 22.8 km^{2} (8.8 sq mi)
- Elevation: 1,304 m (4,278 ft)

Population (31 May 2017)
  - Total: 73
  - Density: 3.2/km^{2} (8.3/sq mi)
- Demonym: Carcoforesi
- Time zone: UTC+1 (CET)
  - Summer (DST): UTC+2 (CEST)
- Postal code: 13026
- Dialing code: 0163
- Website: Official website

Carcoforo is a comune (municipality) in the province of Vercelli in the Italian region Piedmont, located about 100 kilometres (62 mi) northeast of Turin and about 70 kilometres (43 mi) northwest of Vercelli.

Carcoforo borders the following municipalities: Alto Sermenza, Bannio Anzino, Ceppo Morelli, Fobello and Macugnaga.

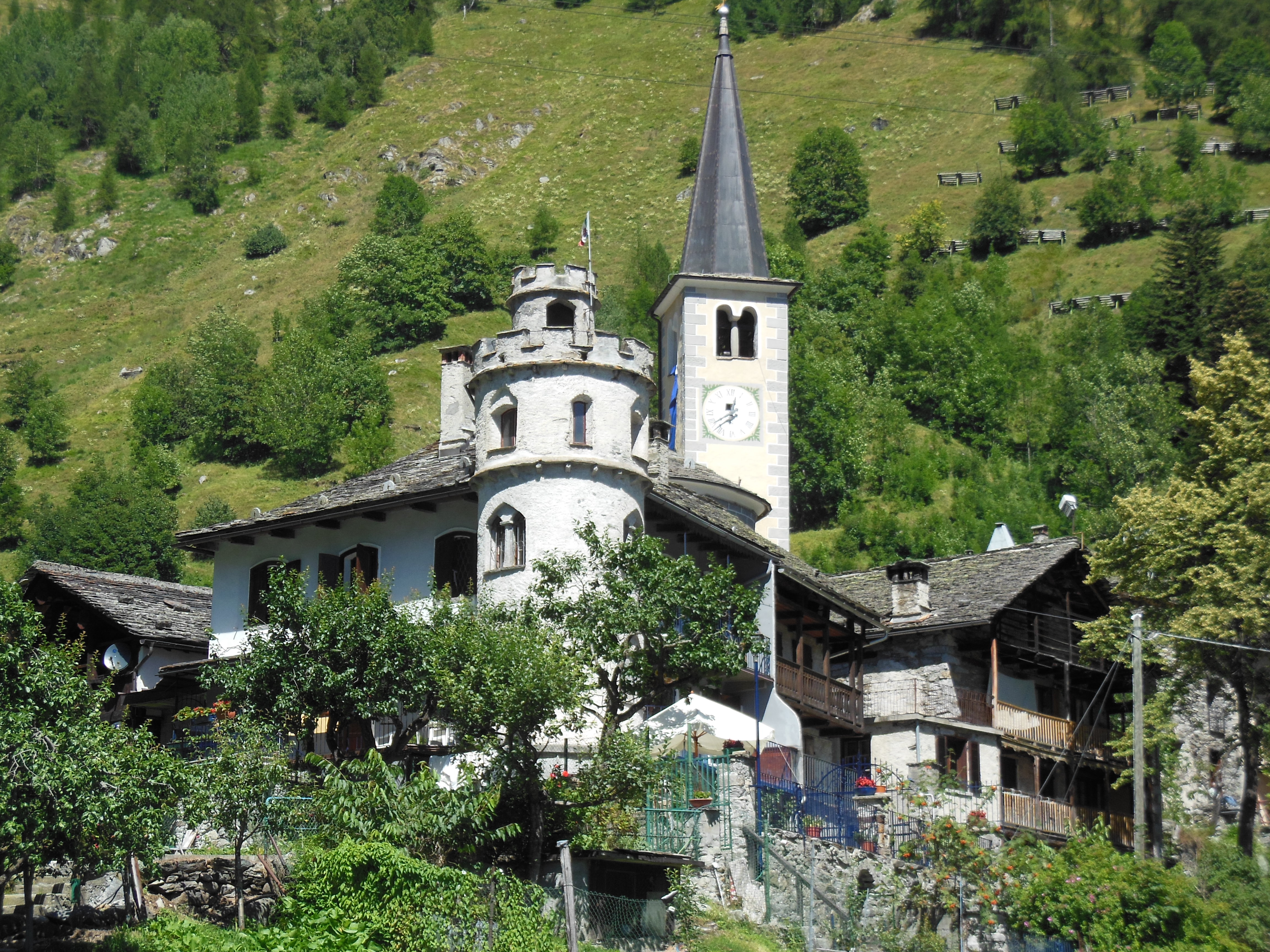
Campanile and the tower house
