= Vanzone con San Carlo =

- Comune
- Comune di Vanzone con San Carlo
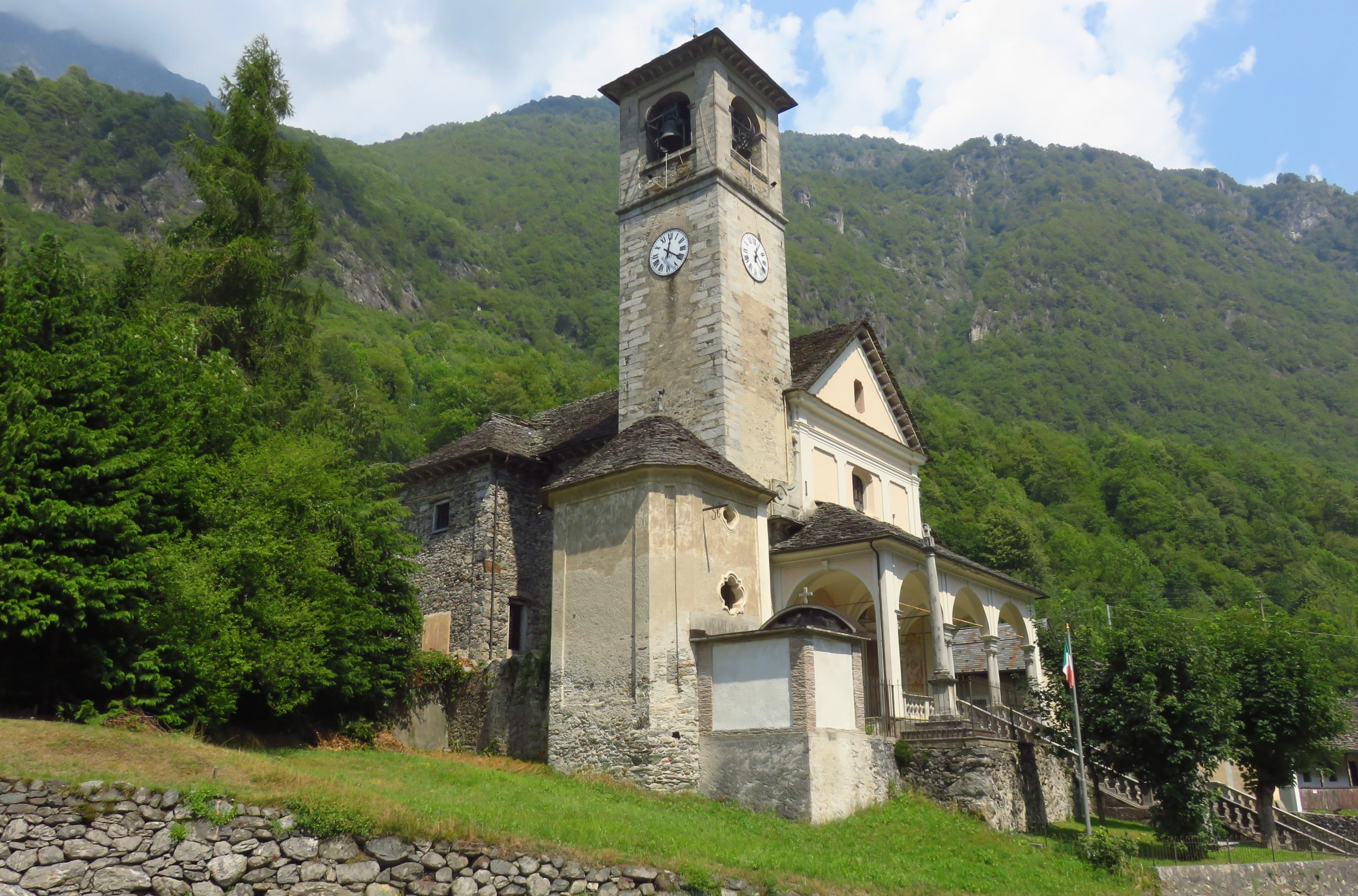

- Location within Italy Location within Piedmont
- Coordinates: 45°58′N 8°6′E
- Country: Italy
- Region: Piedmont
- Province: Verbano-Cusio-Ossola (VB)
- Frazioni: Roletto, Ronchi Dentro, Ronchi Fuori, Valeggio, Croppo

Government
  - Mayor: Claudio Sonzogni

Area
  - Total: 16.2 km^{2} (6.3 sq mi)
- Elevation: 677 m (2,221 ft)

Population (28 February 2017)
  - Total: 394
  - Density: 24.3/km^{2} (63.0/sq mi)
- Demonym: Vanzonesi
- Time zone: UTC+1 (CET)
  - Summer (DST): UTC+2 (CEST)
- Postal code: 28030
- Dialing code: 0324
- Website: Official website

Vanzone con San Carlo is a comune (municipality) in the Province of Verbano-Cusio-Ossola in the Italian region Piedmont, located about 100 kilometres (62 mi) northeast of Turin and about 35 kilometres (22 mi) west of Verbania.

Vanzone con San Carlo borders the following municipalities: Antrona Schieranco, Bannio Anzino, Calasca-Castiglione, Ceppo Morelli.
