= Bannio Anzino =

- Comune
- Comune di Bannio Anzino
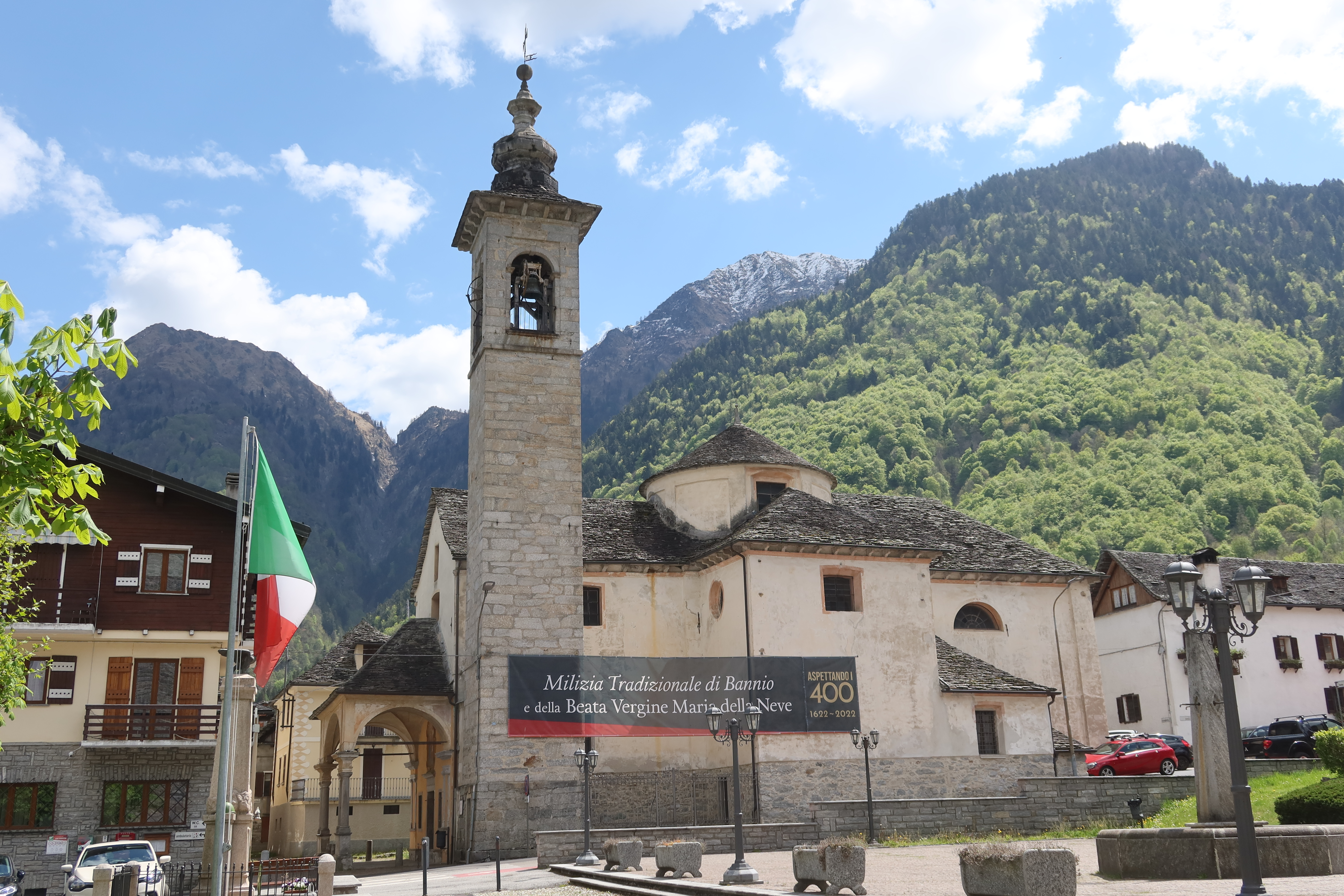

- Coat of arms

- Location within Italy Location within Piedmont
- Coordinates: 45°59′2″N 8°8′46″E
- Country: Italy
- Region: Piedmont
- Province: Verbano-Cusio-Ossola (VB)
- Frazioni: Bannio (communal seat), Anzino, Pontegrande.

Government
  - Mayor: Pierfranco Bonfadini

Area
  - Total: 39.47 km^{2} (15.24 sq mi)
- Elevation: 669 m (2,195 ft)

Population (28 February 2017)
  - Total: 484
  - Density: 12.3/km^{2} (31.8/sq mi)
- Demonyms: Banniesi, Anziniesi
- Time zone: UTC+1 (CET)
  - Summer (DST): UTC+2 (CEST)
- Postal code: 28032
- Dialing code: 0324
- Patron saint: Madonna della Neve
- Saint day: 5 August
- Website: Official website

Bannio Anzino (pop. 539) is a comune of the Province of Verbano-Cusio-Ossola in the Italian region Piedmont, located about 100 kilometres (62 mi) northeast of Turin and about 40 kilometres (25 mi) west of Verbania.

The main population centres within the municipality are the frazioni Bannio (site of the town hall), Pontegrande and Anzino (formerly a comune in its own right); further localities include Case Fornari, Case Prucci, Case Rovazzi, Castelletto, Fontane, Gaggieto, Parcineto, Scalaccia, and Valpiana.

Bannio Anzino borders the following municipalities: Calasca-Castiglione, Carcoforo, Ceppo Morelli, Fobello, Rimella, Vanzone con San Carlo.
