= Ceppo Morelli =

- Comune
- Comune di Ceppo Morelli
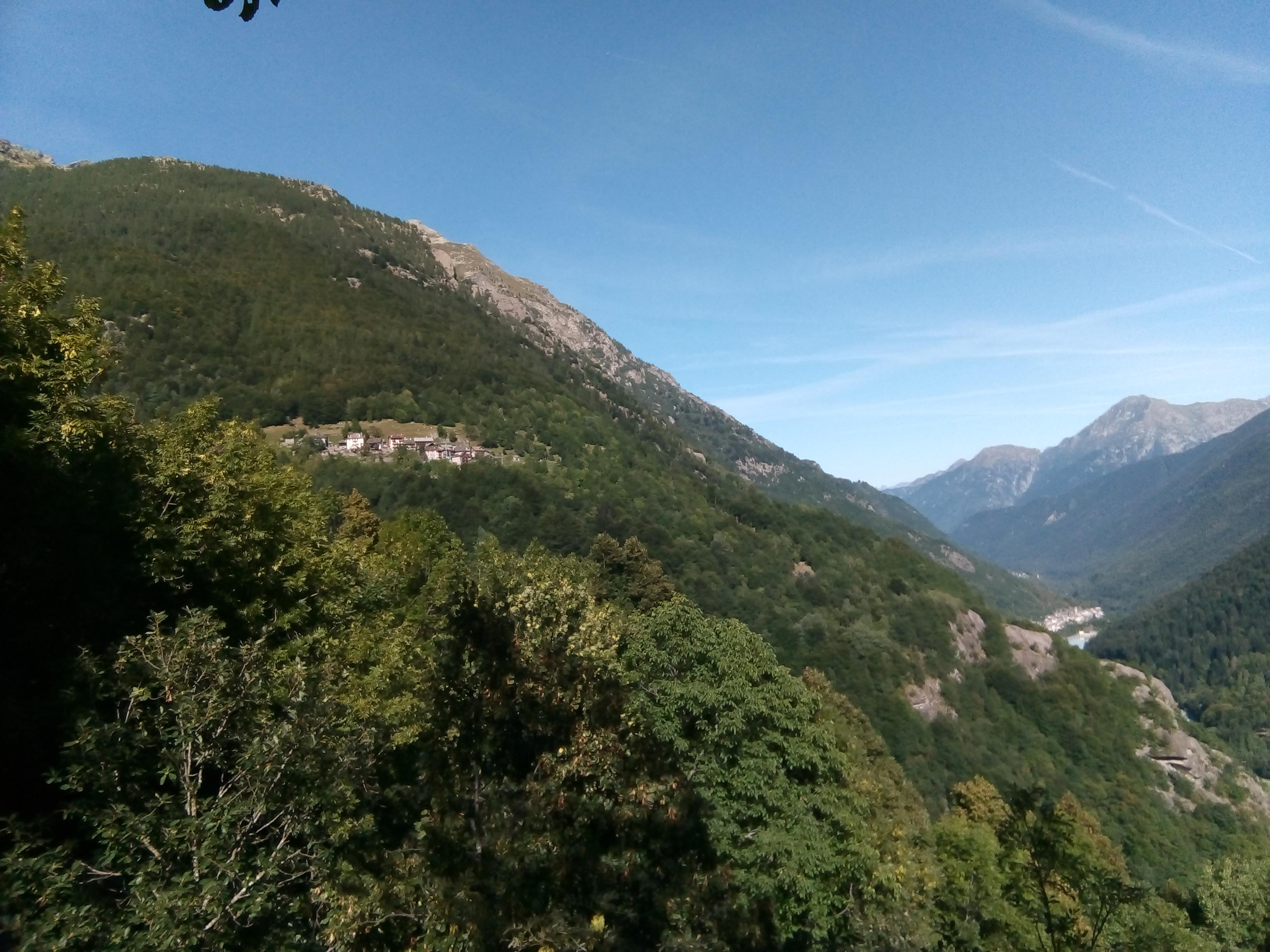

- Coat of arms

- Location within Italy Location within Piedmont
- Coordinates: 45°58′N 8°4′E
- Country: Italy
- Region: Piedmont
- Province: Verbano-Cusio-Ossola (VB)

Government
  - Mayor: Giovanni Consagra

Area
  - Total: 40.19 km^{2} (15.52 sq mi)
- Elevation: 793 m (2,602 ft)

Population (30 June 2017)
  - Total: 310
  - Density: 7.7/km^{2} (20/sq mi)
- Demonym: Ceppomorellesi
- Time zone: UTC+1 (CET)
  - Summer (DST): UTC+2 (CEST)
- Postal code: 28030
- Dialing code: 0324
- Website: Official website

Ceppo Morelli is a comune (municipality) in the Province of Verbano-Cusio-Ossola in the Italian region Piedmont, located about 100 kilometres (62 mi) northeast of Turin and about 35 kilometres (22 mi) west of Verbania, on the border with Switzerland.

Ceppo Morelli borders the following municipalities: Antrona Schieranco, Bannio Anzino, Carcoforo, Macugnaga, Saas Almagell (Switzerland), Vanzone con San Carlo.
