= Macugnaga =

- Comune
- Comune di Macugnaga
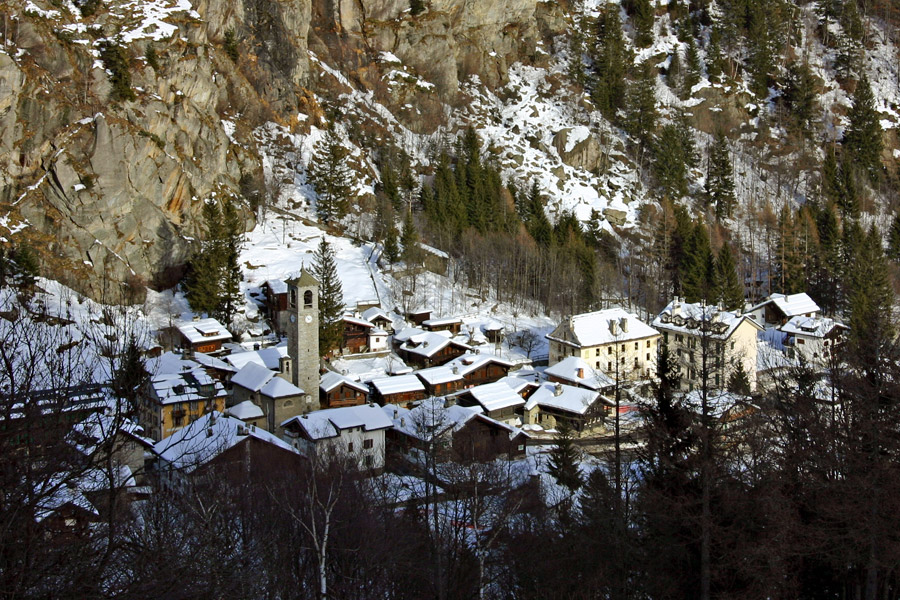

- Flag Coat of arms

- Location within Italy Location within Piedmont
- Coordinates: 45°58′N 7°58′E
- Country: Italy
- Region: Piedmont
- Province: Verbano-Cusio-Ossola (VB)
- Frazioni: Borca, Pestarena, Fornarelli, Isella, Motta, Stabioli, Staffa (municipal seat)

Government
  - Mayor: Alessandro Bonacci

Area
  - Total: 99.57 km^{2} (38.44 sq mi)
- Elevation: 1,327 m (4,354 ft)

Population (1 January 2021)
  - Total: 532
  - Density: 5.34/km^{2} (13.8/sq mi)
- Demonym: Macugnaghese(i)
- Time zone: UTC+1 (CET)
  - Summer (DST): UTC+2 (CEST)
- Postal code: 28876
- Dialing code: 0324
- Patron saint: Assumption of Mary
- Saint day: 15 August
- Website: Official website

Macugnaga (Walser German: Z'Makana) is a mountain village and a comune at 1,327 metres (4,354 ft) elevation, in the province of Verbano-Cusio-Ossola, in the north of the Piedmont region of Italy.

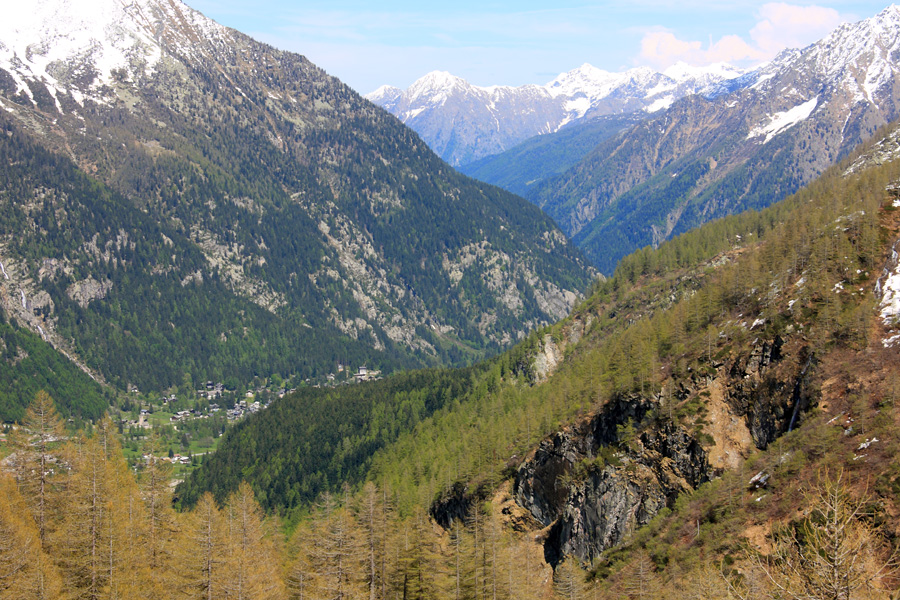
Valle Anzasca

It is located at the base of Monte Rosa (4,638 metres (15,217 ft)), the second-tallest mountain in western Europe, along Valle Anzasca, one of the seven valleys around the mount.

Sights in the town include the Chiesa Vecchia (old church) and its linden also of the 13th century, the Chiesa Nuova (new church) built in 1707, the 17th century Casa Pala. The town also houses a museum of mountaineering, while in the hamlet of Borca is the Walser Museum, devoted to the local German population who colonised the valley during the Middle Ages coming from the Swiss canton Wallis.

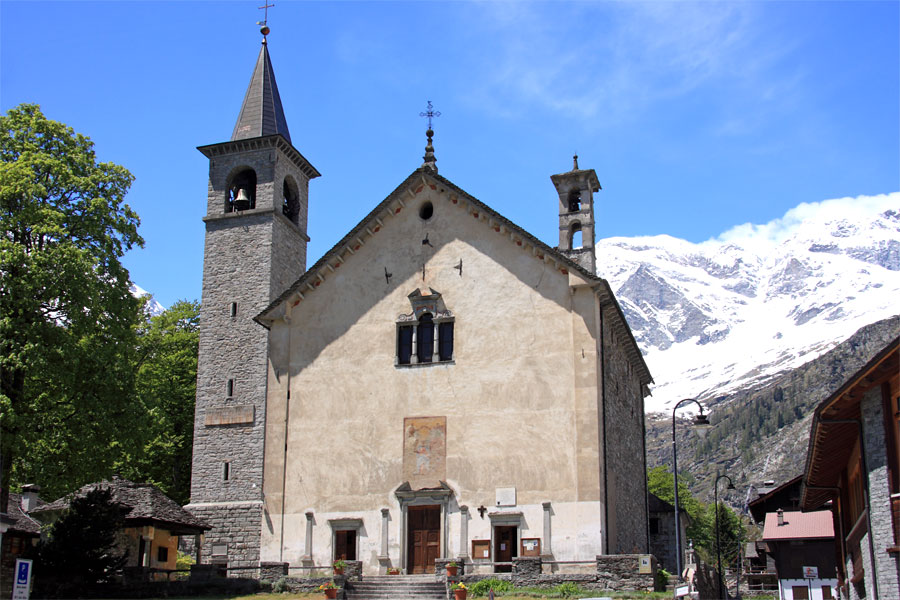
The parish church.

The area gives many opportunities for skiing in winter (a cableway brings from the central square of the town to the 3000 m (9800 ft) of the Passo del Monte Moro on the border with Switzerland), and hiking and mountaineering in summer. There are a swimming pool, a tennis centre, and a football field for sport activities.

The village is also known for its mine (Miniera della Guia).

== Geography ==
The territory is characterised by numerous rivers, some of which are Horlovono, Pedriola, Tambach, Testa / Tieschtbach, Quarazza / Kratz and Val Rossa, all of them coming from Anza / Vispu. This last one is born from the union between the Belvedere Glacier. A lot of small lakes can be found around the village, as well as a dam, known as Lago delle Fate (lake of the fairies).

== Dorf ==
The Dorf is an area of the village of Macugnaga, located near the Old Church and its cemetery, where the ancient huts made of larch trunks, in which the Walser community used to live, are located.

The houses followed the style of the Nordic populations: they were made of larch wood to protect its inhabitants from the cold weather. They were equipped with a stove together with an oven, there was also a kitchen, two bedrooms and a cellar. In the most recent structures, the kitchen was built in brickwork to prevent the risk of fires. Other buildings, apart from the houses, can include farmhouses with a stable and a barn.

In the Dorf, there is also a traditional stone bakery oven which was used by the Walser people once a year to bake bread. It was an important moment for the community to ensure food supplies in the following months.

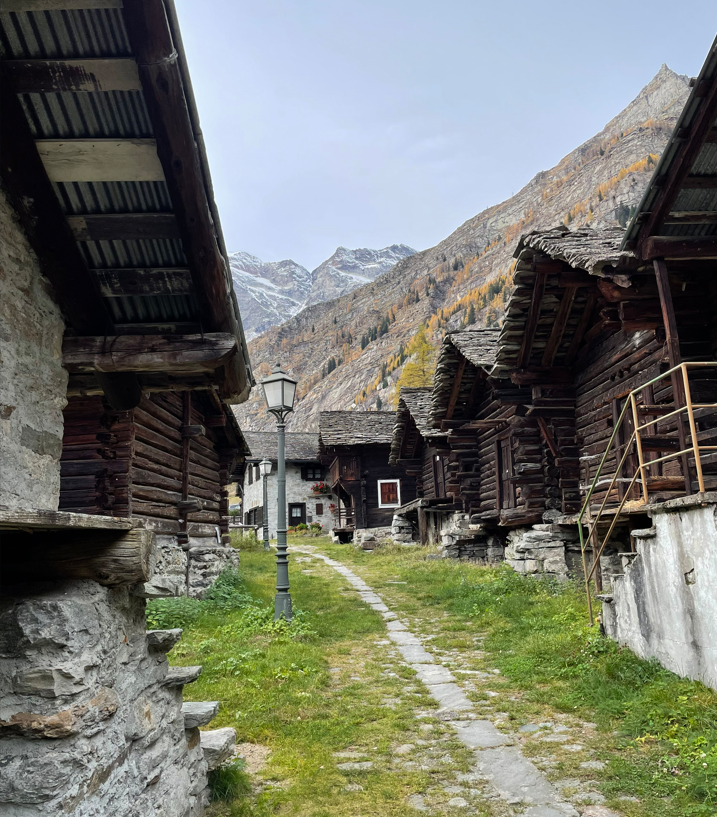
The Dorf, Macugnaga, Italy

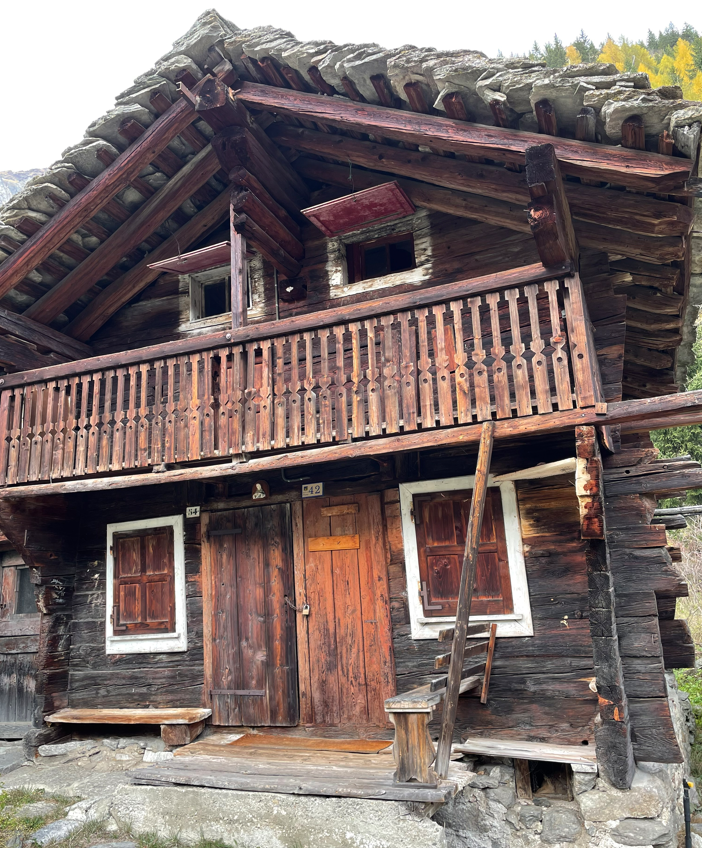
Traditional Walser hut located in the Dorf, Macugnaga, Italy

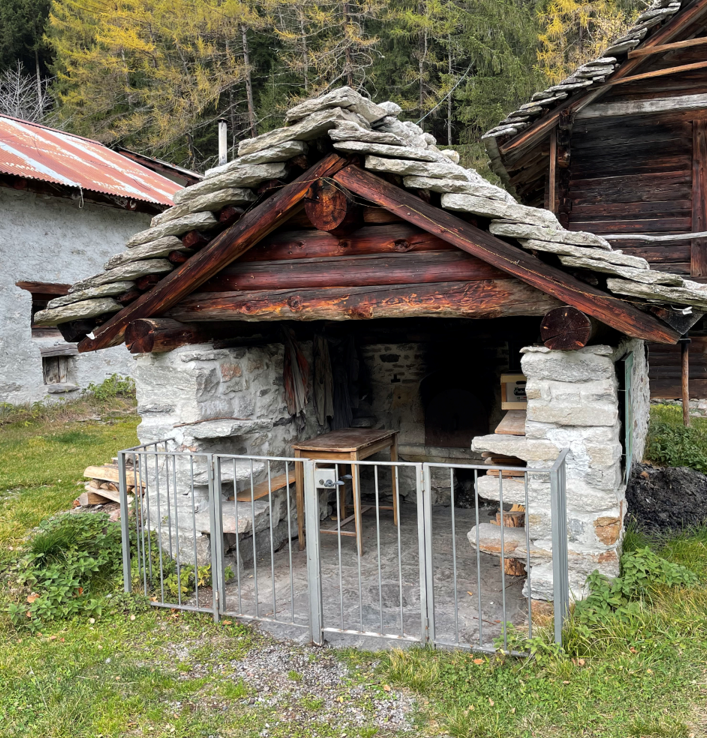
Stone bakery oven located in the Dorf, Macugnaga, Italy

== Twin cities ==
- Edmonton, Alberta, Canada and Predeal, Romania.
