= Pizzo Bianco =

Mountain in Italy

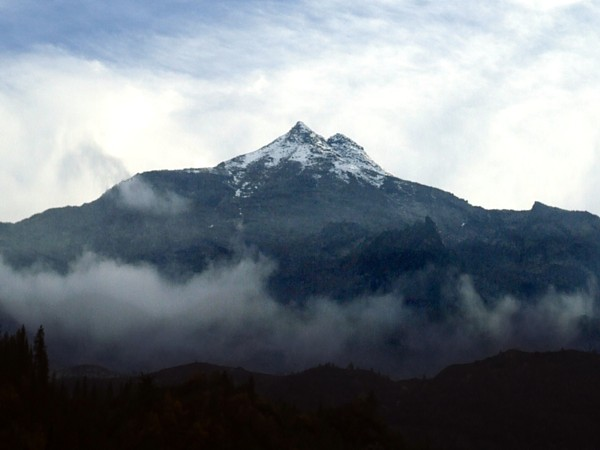
- View from the Belvedere (north side)

Highest point
- Elevation: 3,215 m (10,548 ft)
- Prominence: 225 m (738 ft)
- Parent peak: Monte Rosa
- Coordinates: 45°56′17″N 7°56′24″E

Geography
- Location within Alps
- Location: Piedmont, Italy
- Parent range: Pennine Alps

Pizzo Bianco is a mountain of the Pennine Alps, overlooking Macugnaga in the Italian region of Piedmont. It lies on the range north of the Punta Grober, between the Belvedere Glacier and the valley of Quarazza.

Pizzo Bianco faces the east wall of Monte Rosa and is a popular vantage point. In 1789 Horace-Bénédict de Saussure reached its summit in order to measure the height of Monte Rosa.
