= Dunantspitze =

Mountain in Switzerland

- Ostspitze
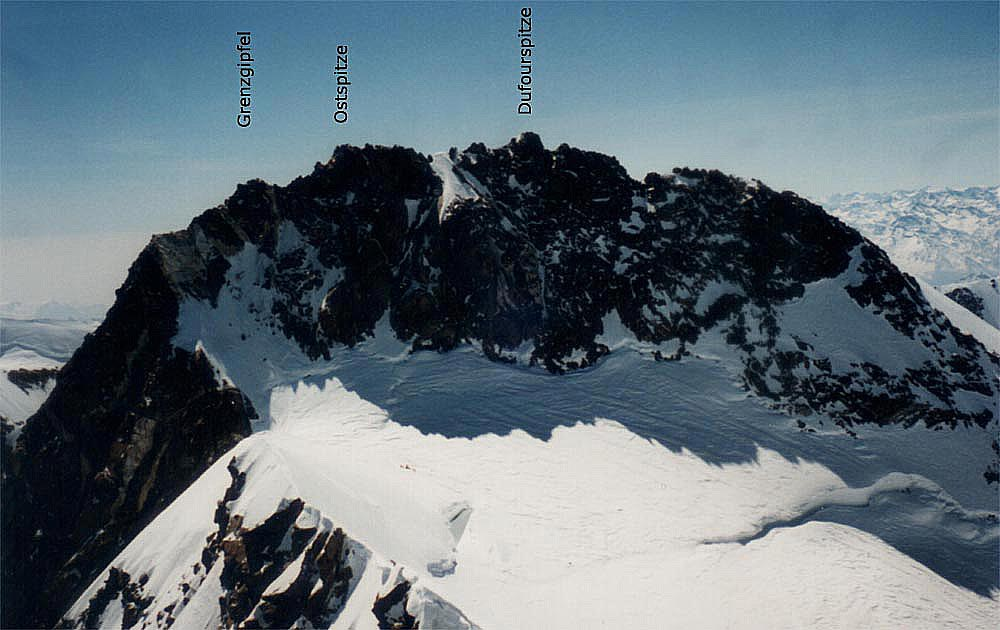
- The Dunantspitze, lying between the Grenzgipfel and the Dufourspitze (seen from Nordend)

Highest point
- Elevation: 4,632 m (15,197 ft)
- Prominence: 15 m (49 ft)
- Parent peak: Monte Rosa
- Isolation: 0.08 km (0.050 mi) to Dufourspitze
- Coordinates: 45°56′13″N 7°52′04″E

Naming
- English translation: Peak Dunant

Geography
- Location within Switzerland
- Location: Valais, Switzerland
- Parent range: Pennine Alps

Climbing
- First ascent: 12 August 1848 by Johann Madutz and Matthias Zumtaugwald or 1 September 1854 by Ulrich Lauener, Johann and Matthias Zumtaugwald guiding Christopher, Edmund and James G. Smyth
- Easiest route: West ridge from the Sattel or south-east ridge via the Grenzgipfel.

The Dunantspitze (German for "Peak Dunant", 4,632 m), formerly called Ostspitze ("Eastern Peak"), is a peak of the Monte Rosa Massif in the Pennine Alps in Switzerland. It is the second highest peak of the massif, after the Dufourspitze (4,634 m) and the second highest summit in Switzerland, but its prominence is only about 15 metres. At the time of its first ascent it was unclear which of the summits was the higher.

== Naming ==
Dunantspitze and Dufourspitze were originally just the eastern and western summits (Ostspitze and Westspitze) of the Gornerhorn. Westspitze was renamed Dufourspitze in 1863 in honour of Guillaume-Henri Dufour, while Ostspitze retained its name until October 2014. It was then renamed Dunantspitze in honour of Henry Dunant, the Swiss founder of the International Committee of the Red Cross (ICRC) in 1863.

== First ascents ==
The first approaches to the Gornerhorn were made from the northern slopes over the Gorner glacier via the Silbersattel (4,510 m). This pass was first reached on August 12, 1847, by the Zermatt guides Matthias and Johann Zumtaugwald/zum Taugwald, Johann Brantschen and Joseph Moser guiding the French professors Victor Puisieux and Edouard Ordinaire. Precisely a year later (12 August 1848), Johann Madutz from Matt, Glarus, and Matthias Zumtaugwald guided the Swiss theologian de:Melchior Ulrich to the pass for an ascent of the highest summit. Ulrich had to give up, but the guides proceeded to climb to what they thought to be the Ostspitze and established a new altitude record in Switzerland (which since 1820 had been held at 4,563 m by the climbers of the Zumsteinspitze). The descent over the same route was so tricky that Madutz at places had to lower down Zumtaugwald by rope. Three years later, on 22 August 1851, Johann Zumtaugwald returned, with Peter Taugwalder and Peter Inderbinen and the Swiss botanist brothers Adolf and Hermann Schlagintweit to repeat this ascent. They did not dare to traverse to the western summit, which the Schlagintweits measured to be 7 meters higher.

In 1891, W.A.B. Coolidge analyzed these ascents and concluded that both parties had reached the 4,618 m Grenzgipfel instead, which is a mere 50 meters to the east of Dunantspitze, an idea adopted by the Alpine historian Gottlieb Studer in 1899. Coolidge transferred the honor of first climbing Dunantspitze to the brothers Christopher, Edmund and James G. Smyth from Great Yarmouth and unnamed guides, who reached it on 1 September 1854, also from the Silbersattel. (The guides were Ulrich Lauener from Lauterbrunnen and Matthias and Johann Zumtaugwald.) Two more parties reached the Ostspitze within two weeks, each time with Zumtaugwald brothers as guides. The 1870 Siegfried Map, current in Coolidge and Studer's time, shows Grenzgipfel to be exactly 7 meters lower than the Ostspitze and Dufourspitze, perhaps helping Coolidge to make his assessment. The real, 14 m height difference (a ~24° instead of 12° angle from Grenzspitze) and the presence of Zumtaugwalds at every ascent suggest a weakness in Coolidge's argument, and modern writers like Pusch, Dumler and Burkhardt assume that the 1848 and 1851 ascendants reached Dunantspitze after all.

The first traverse of the entire summit ridge (Grenzgipfel (4,618 m) – Dunantspitze (4,632 m) – Dufourspitze (4,634 m)) was by Ferdinand Imseng, Gabriel Spechtenhauser, Giovanni Oberto, Richard Pendlebury, William Pendlebury and Charles Taylor, on July 23, 1872. This party had made the first ascent, earlier in the day, of the Macugnaga face.

== See also ==
- List of mountains of Switzerland named after people
