= Ferrino (company) =

Italian tent company

- Industry: Retail
- Founded: Turin, Italy (1870)
- Headquarters: Turin, Italy
- Products: Tents, clothing, outdoor gear
- Website: www.ferrino.com

Ferrino S.p.A. is an Italian tents, outdoor accessories and clothing manufacturer, founded in Turin by Cesare Ferrino in 1870. The company's product range includes tents and snowshoes.

Ferrino tents have been tested at high altitudes, including Monte Rosa and Mont Blanc in the Alps.

For years Ferrino has supplied equipment to some associations including the Department of Civil Protection, the Red Cross, Doctors without Borders, Emergency and the National Alpine and Speleological Rescue Corps.

In January 2008, one of the major manufacturers of snowshoes, Baldas, came under the Ferrino brand.
