= Anza (river) =

River in Italy

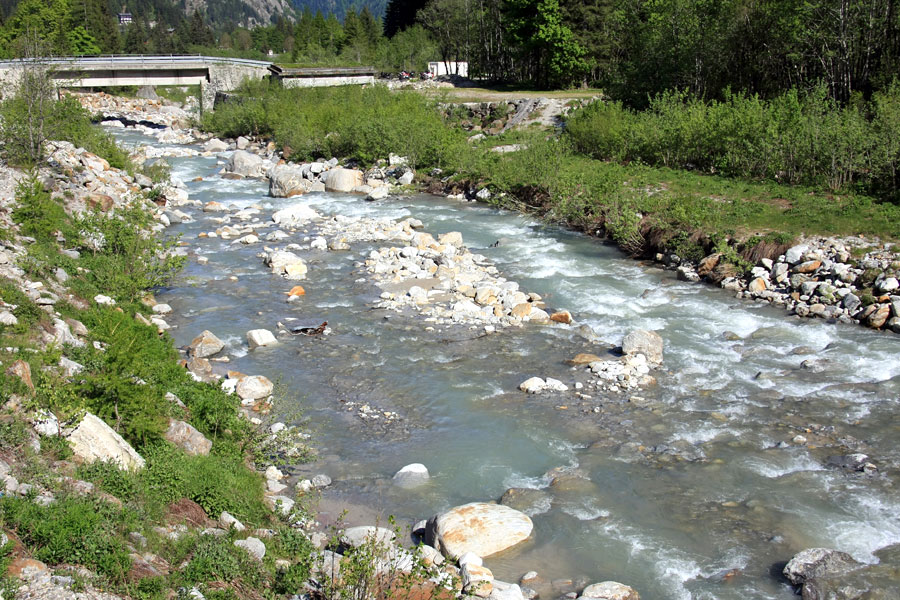

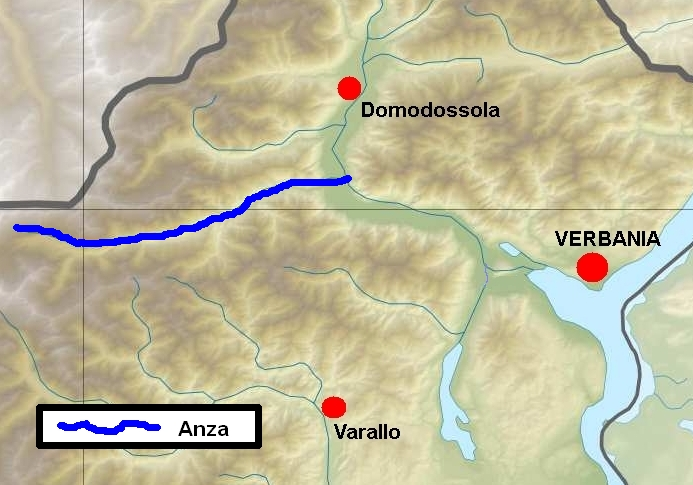
- Location within NE Piedmont

Location
- Country: Italy

Physical characteristics
- Source
  - location: Macugnaga, Belvedere Glacier
  - elevation: 1,800 m (5,900 ft)
- Mouth: Toce
  - coordinates: 46.0148°N 8.2825°E
- Length: 35 km (22 mi)

Basin features
- Progression: Toce

The Anza is a 35-kilometre (22 mi) Alpine torrent of the Ossola in northern Italy. It flows from the glaciers of Monte Rosa through the Valle Anzasca and into the river Toce, of which it is a right tributary.

Its own principal tributaries are the Pedriola, the Tambach, the Orlovono and the Quarazza near Macugnaga and the Olocchia at Bannio Anzino.
