= Margherita Hut =

Italian alpine mountain hut

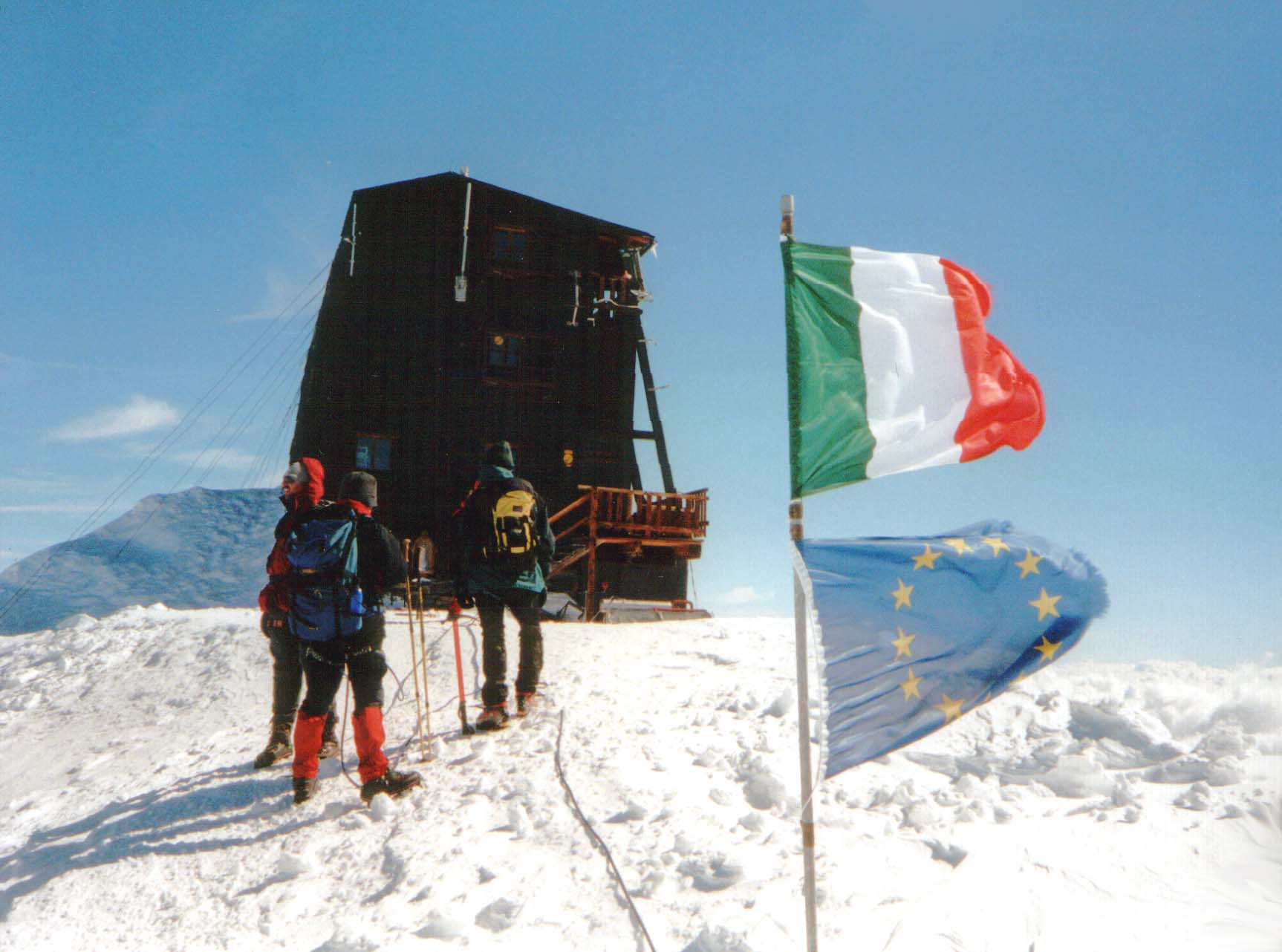
- The Margherita Hut in August 2002

- Location within Piedmont

General information
- Location: Punta Gnifetti
- Coordinates: 45°55′37″N 7°52′38″E
- Elevation: 4,554 m (14,941 ft)
- Year built: 1893 (133 years ago)
- Owner: Italian Alpine Club

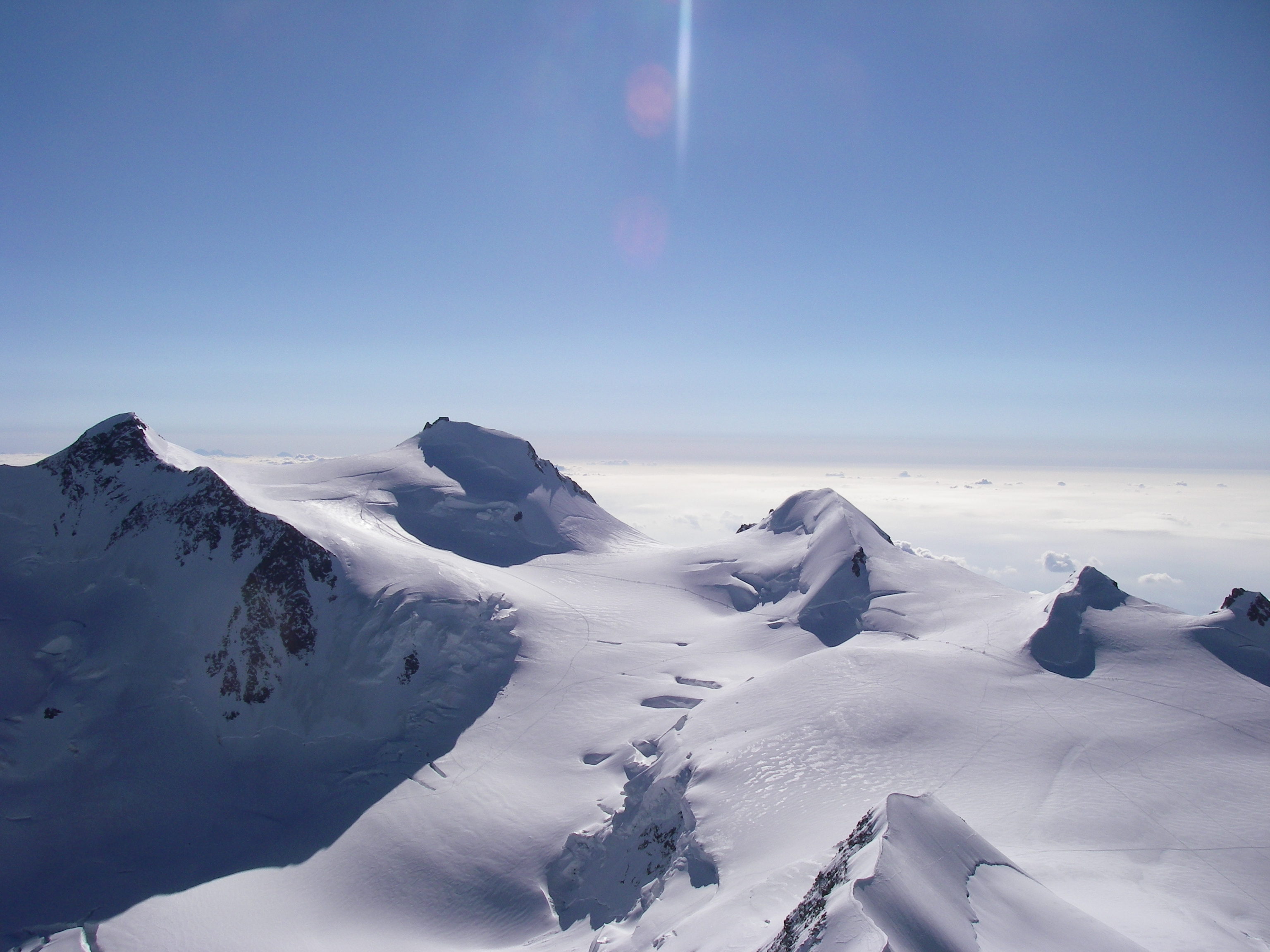
Monte Rosa massif, with Signalkuppe and Margherita Hut (visible on second skyline peak from the left)

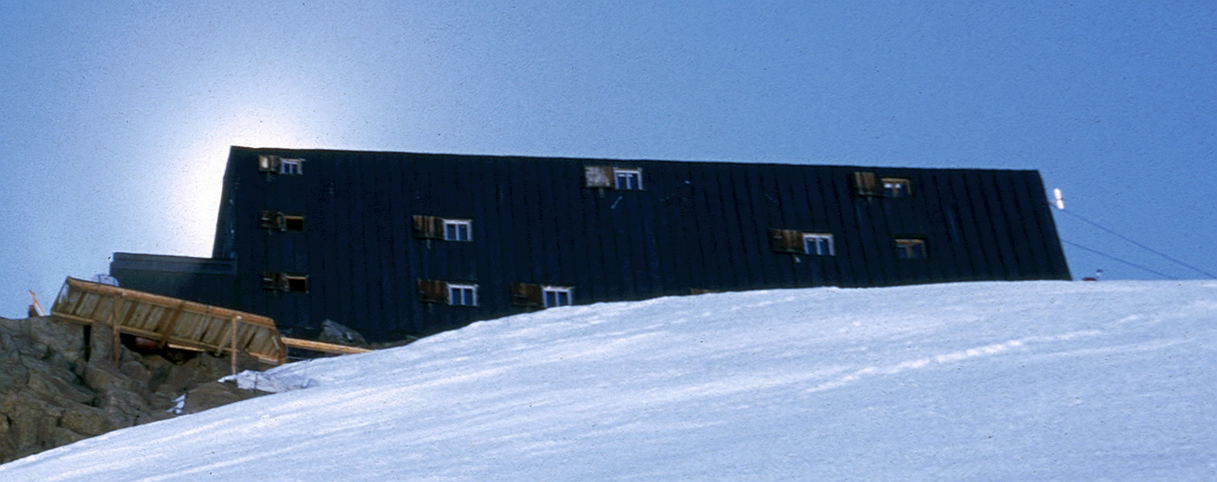
Margherita Hut visible in full length from the side

The Margherita Hut (Italian: Capanna Regina Margherita, French: Cabane reine Marguerite) is a mountain hut belonging to the Italian Alpine Club, located on the summit of Punta Gnifetti (Signalkuppe) of Monte Rosa, a mountain massif of the Alps lying near the border between Italy and Switzerland. At 4,554 metres (14,941 ft) above sea level, it is the highest building in Europe. It was originally opened in 1893 as a research station for high altitude medicine which it still is, but it also serves as a simply equipped mountain hut for alpinists.

== Location ==
It is also among the largest huts of the massif, together with the Monte Rosa Hut and Gnifetti Hut. The Margherita Hut is located in Italian territory, near the international border between Italy and Switzerland, in the Italian region of Piedmont. The nearest settlement is Alagna Valsesia, in Piedmont, starting point for the traditional climb to the hut.

== History ==
The construction of the hut was directed by the Italian Alpine Club in 1889. The hut was pre-built in the valley, then brought to its final destination by mule and then by men, and assembled on site. It was opened on 18 August 1893, in the presence of Margherita of Savoy, Queen of Italy, to whom the hut is dedicated.

The hut soon became an important research centre for high-elevation medicine, under the direction of Angelo Mosso. As the hut was quite small, in 1907 a newer, lower research centre ("Istituto Mosso") was built near the Salati Pass, in Valsesia Valley (Alagna Valsesia), at an elevation of about 2,900 metres (9,500 ft).

In 1899 a meteorological station was added. The lowest temperature registered was −41 °C in the winter of 1928–1929; in recent years the lowest was −37.5 °C registered on 25 January 2005.

A complete restoration started in 1977. The original hut was dismantled and was replaced by the current hut, built in Valsesia in the town of Failungo Superiore, very close to Alagna Valsesia, which opened in 1980.

== Features ==
The hut is owned by the central committee of the Italian Alpine Club (CAI), but it is managed by the local CAI section of Varallo Sesia.

The hut is open in the summer, from early June to early September, the exact dates varying from year to year. It provides recuperation and accommodation, having 70 beds. In winter, there is an unmanaged winter facility with 12 beds.

From summer 2017, the performance of civil marriage ceremonies within the Margherita Hut was authorised by the mayor of the nearest town, Alagna Valsesia. However, couples wishing to get married will be unable to arrive by helicopter, and will still have to make the long glacier hike via one of the normal mountaineering routes.

== Access ==
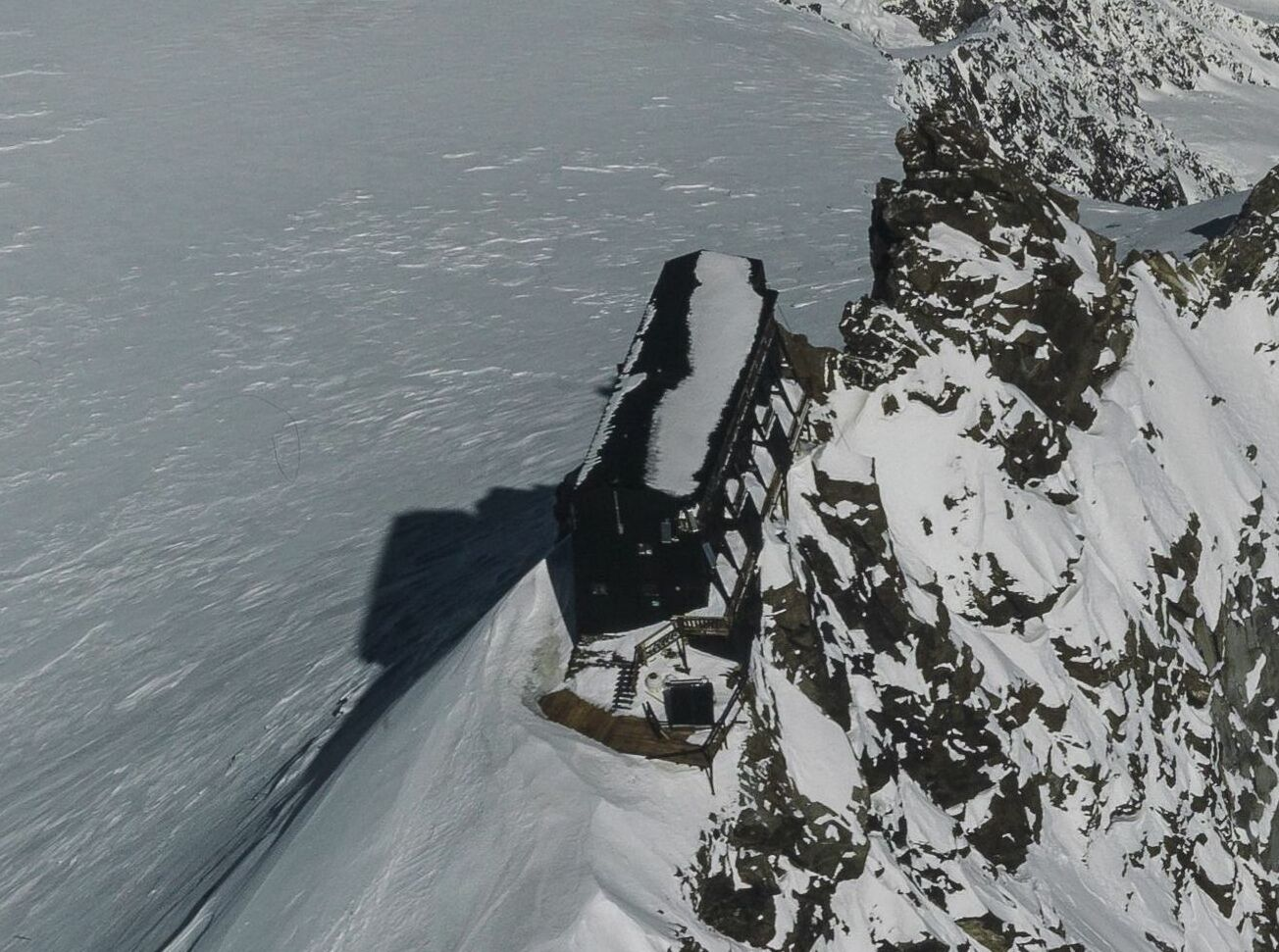
Aerial photo of the hut (1995)

The hut can only be accessed on foot. The traditional approach starts from Alagna Valsesia, the town where the first ascent to the summit in 1842 realized by the parish priest of Alagna Valsesia, Giovanni Gnifetti, was organised. The walk to the hut usually takes two days; climbers spend a night at the Gnifetti Hut, the Monte Rosa Hut or the Resegotti Hut (from the latter the climb is very difficult and technical since it requires climbing the Signal ridge), from where they set off for the Margherita Hut on the following morning. The walk requires physical fitness and a good knowledge of alpine techniques.
