= Signalkuppe =

Mountain in Switzerland

- Punta Gnifetti
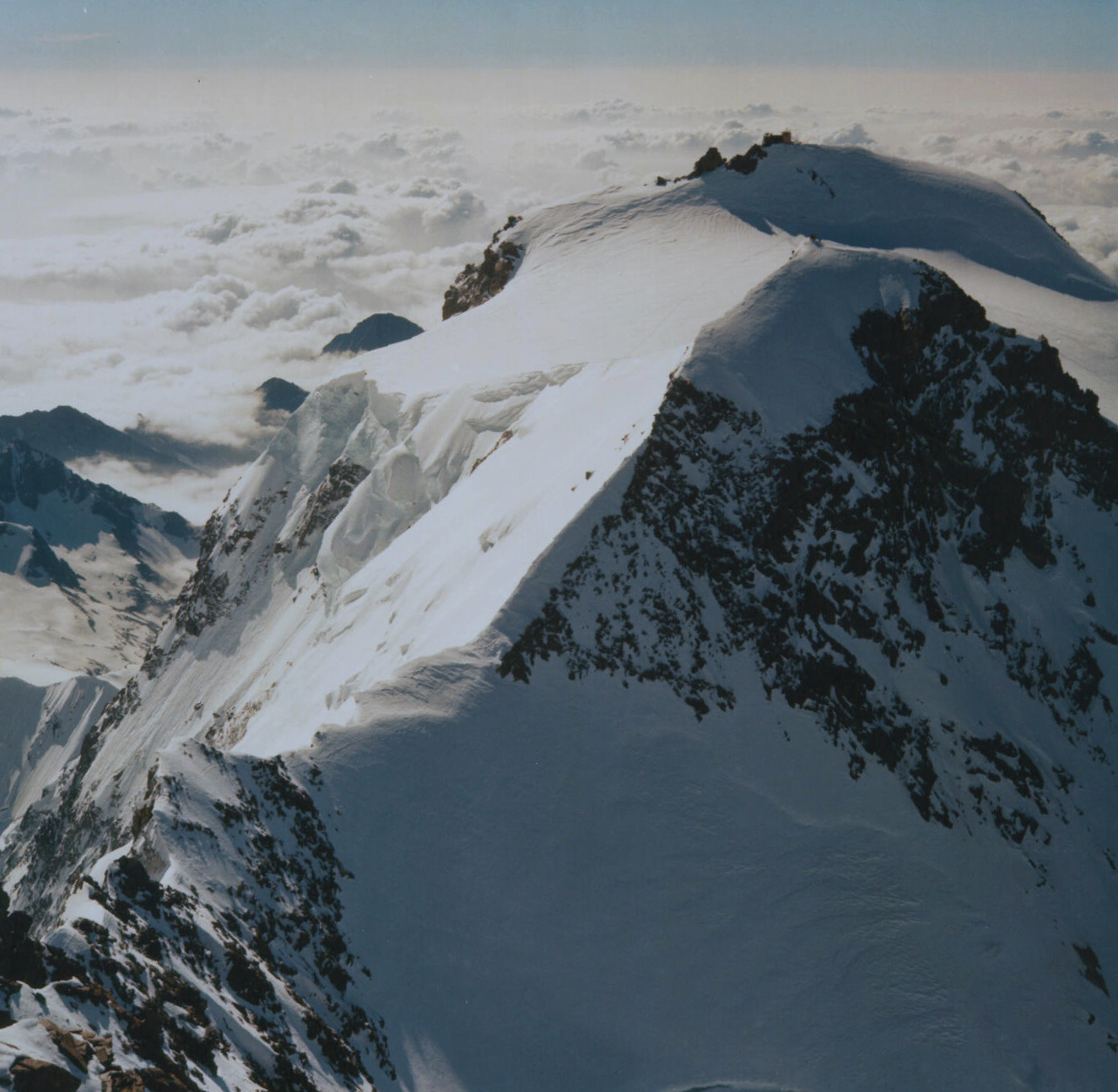
- The Signalkuppe lying behind the Zumsteinspitze. The Margherita hut is just visible on the summit.

Highest point
- Elevation: 4,554 m (14,941 ft)
- Prominence: 98 m ↓ Colle Gnifetti
- Parent peak: Dufourspitze of Monte Rosa
- Isolation: 0.7 km → Zumsteinspitze
- Coordinates: 45°55′38″N 7°52′37″E

Geography
- Location within Alps
- Location: Piedmont, Italy / Valais, Switzerland
- Parent range: Pennine Alps

Climbing
- First ascent: 9 August 1842 by Giovanni Gnifetti and party
- Easiest route: Glacier tour via west flank, south-west ridge (F)

The Signalkuppe (in German, pronounced seeg-nall-koo-pay) also known as Punta Gnifetti (in Italian) (4,554 m) is a peak in the Pennine Alps on the border between Italy and Switzerland. It is a subpeak of Monte Rosa. The mountain is named after 'the Signal', a prominent gendarme atop the east ridge, named Cresta Signal.

The first ascent was made by Giovanni Gnifetti, a parish priest from Alagna Valsesia, together with J. Farinetti, C. Ferraris, C. Grober, J. and G. Giordiano and their porters on 9 August 1842.

The highest hut in Europe, the Margherita Hut (Capanna Margherita, named after Italy's Queen consort Margherita of Savoy) lies on the summit of the mountain. Work started in 1890, supported by the Italian crown, and Queen Margherita opened it in 1893. The new hut, effectively a high-altitude Faraday cage, is clad in sheet copper to shield against unwanted electrical fields.

The Signalkuppe (Punta Gnifetti) is connected to the Zumsteinspitze (Italian: Punta Zumstein) (German: Zumsteinspitze) by the high-alpine glaciated saddle Colle Gnifetti.

== See also ==
- List of Alpine four-thousanders
- List of mountains of Switzerland named after people
