= Monte Rosa Hut =

Mountain hut in Switzerland

Coordinates: 45°57′28.5″N 7°48′44.6″E

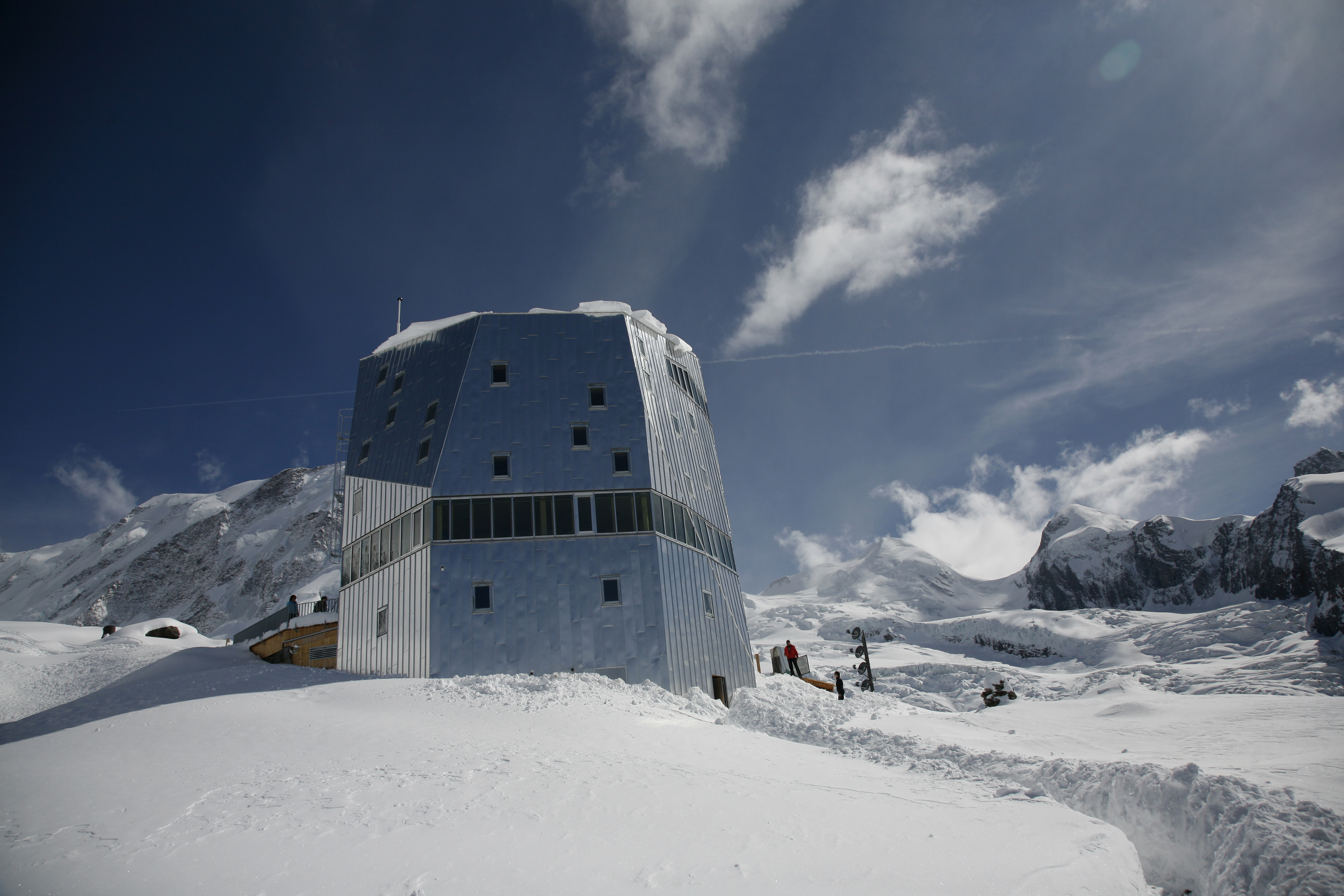
View on the new hut, opened in 2009, from the west side. On the left behind it the Lyskamm. More to the left, but outside of the viewing angle, is the Monte Rosa massif.

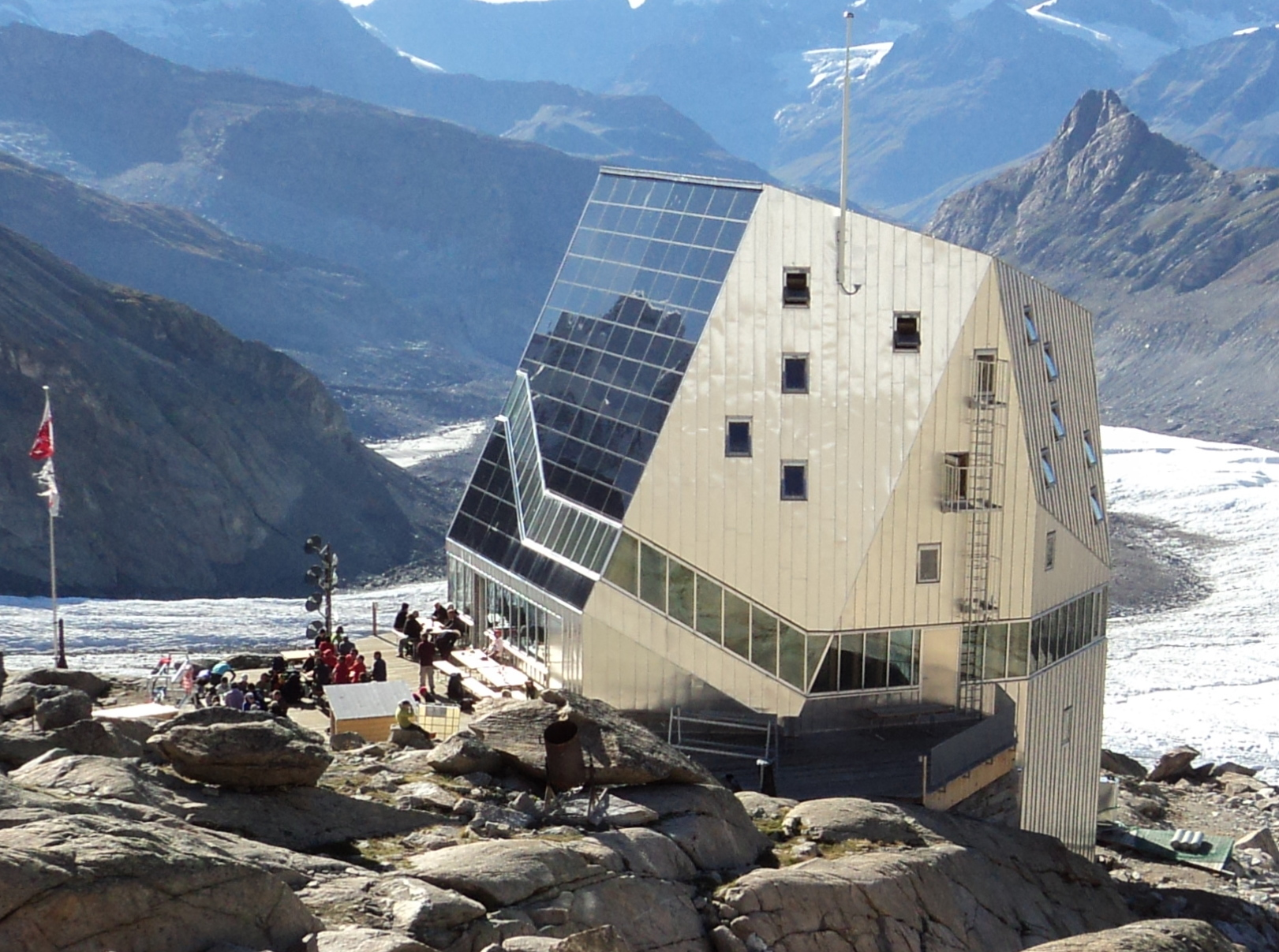
The hut seen from the direction of the Monte Rosa massif, behind it the Grenzgletscher (border glacier)

The Monte Rosa Hut (German: Monte Rosa Hütte) is a mountain hut located near Zermatt on the Monte Rosa massif (up to 4,634 m (15,203 ft)) and above the Grenzgletscher (Border Glacier) sitting on a glacier-free rocky part called Untere Platte at an altitude of 2,883 metres (9,459 ft). It is owned by the Swiss Alpine Club. The hut is the start of the normal route to the summit and other mountains in the area. The first hut was built in 1894–1895 just next to the then still much higher Border Glacier at an altitude of 2,795 metres (9,170 ft). A completely new building was inaugurated in 2009, a hi-tech, energy-wise almost self-sufficient, environmentally friendly mountain hut based on wood with an aluminium shell.

== Location ==
The Monte Rosa Hut lies on the western side of Monte Rosa massif, on the place named Untere Plattje. It dominates the Grenzgletscher (Border Glacier) to the south and west, and further down the Gorner Glacier, and is surrounded by many four-thousanders, such as Nordend, Dufourspitze, Liskamm, Castor, Pollux, Roccia Nera and the Breithorn.

The hut can be reached using the Gornergratbahn; from the station Rotenboden a trail leads to the Gorner Glacier (blue and white paint markings). Then the Gornergletscher has to be crossed (route usually marked with poles), then over the lower end of the Grenzgletscher, finally at around 2,600 m the trail continues directly to the hut (blue and white paint markings).

== History ==
=== The first hut from 1895 ===
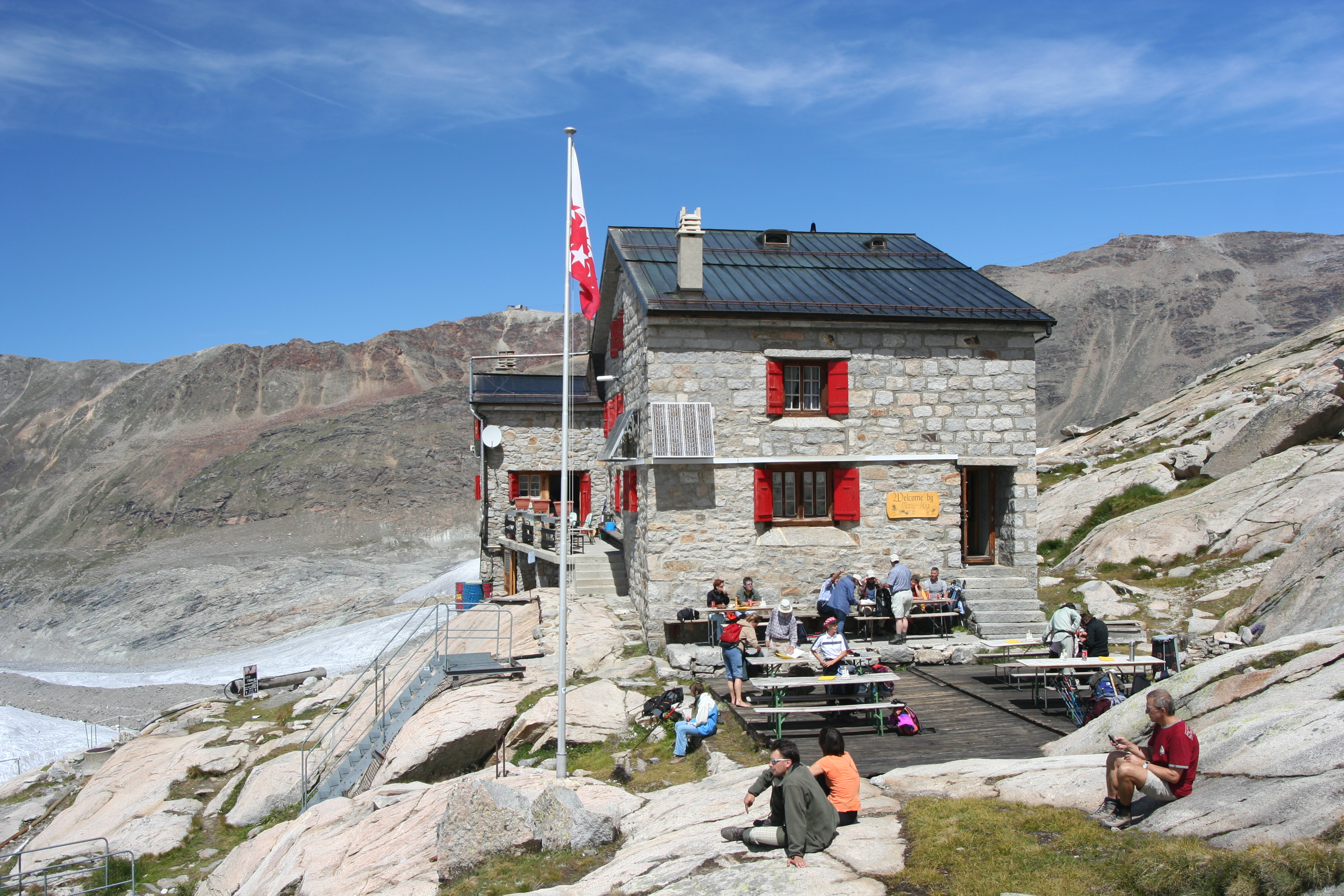
Old stone-based hut (1895–2011)

The first hut, known under the name Bétemps hut after a family sponsoring the construction, was originally built between 1894 and 1895. It had 25 beds and was owned by the Swiss Alpine Club central committee. The hut was enlarged in 1918 to host 20 more people. The Bétemps hut was offered to the Monte Rosa section in 1929 then transformed and renamed Monte Rosa hut. Between 1939-1940 a new hut with 86 beds was built. The capacity was raised up to 146 in 1972 and 160 in 1984.

After the new hut was opened in September 2009, the old hut was disassembled for 100,000 Swiss francs and was demolished on 14 July 2011 by a unit of the Swiss Armed Forces using more than 100 kg of military plastic explosive. The demolition was a condition for the allowance to build the new hut close by.

=== The new hut ===
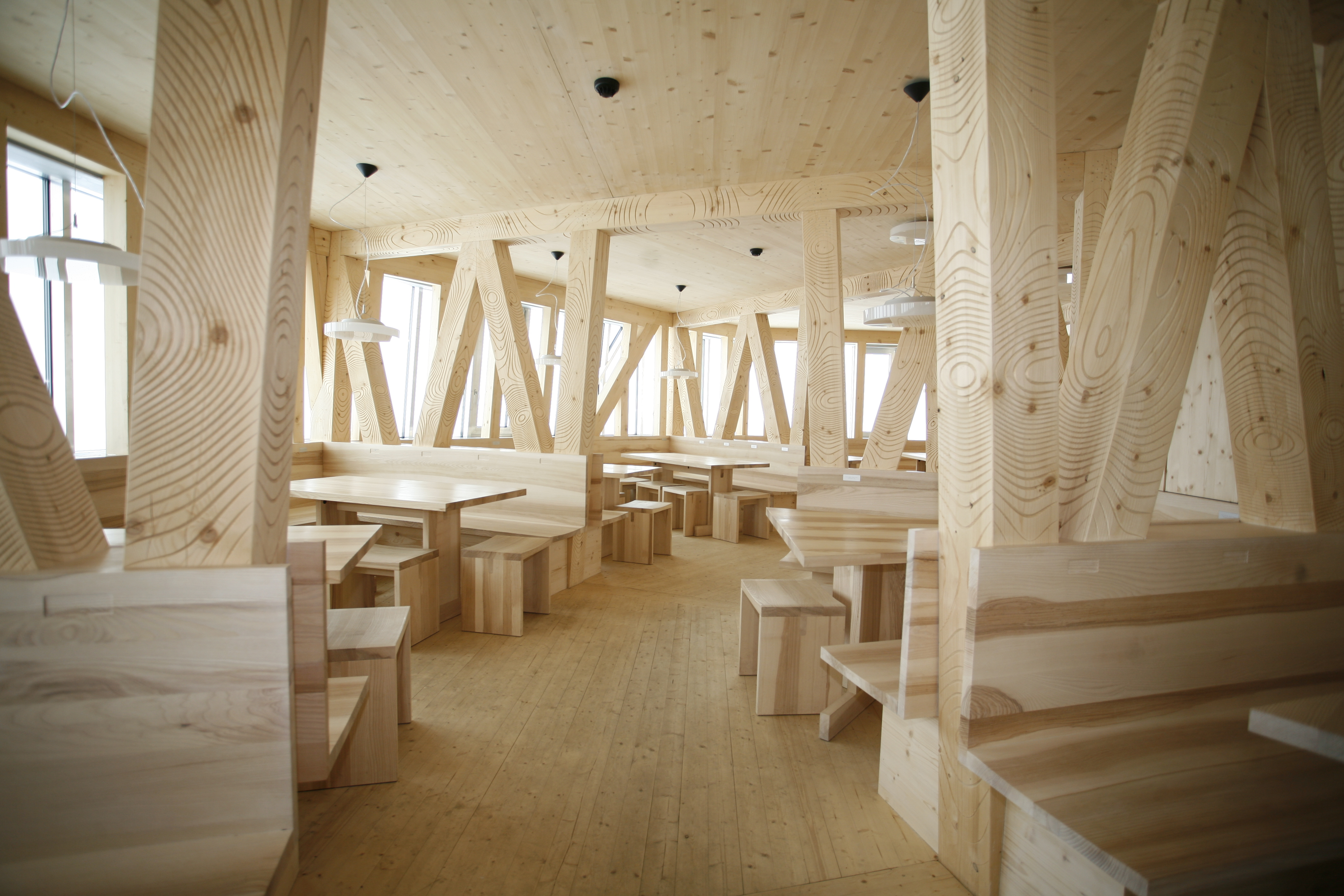
Inside the new hut

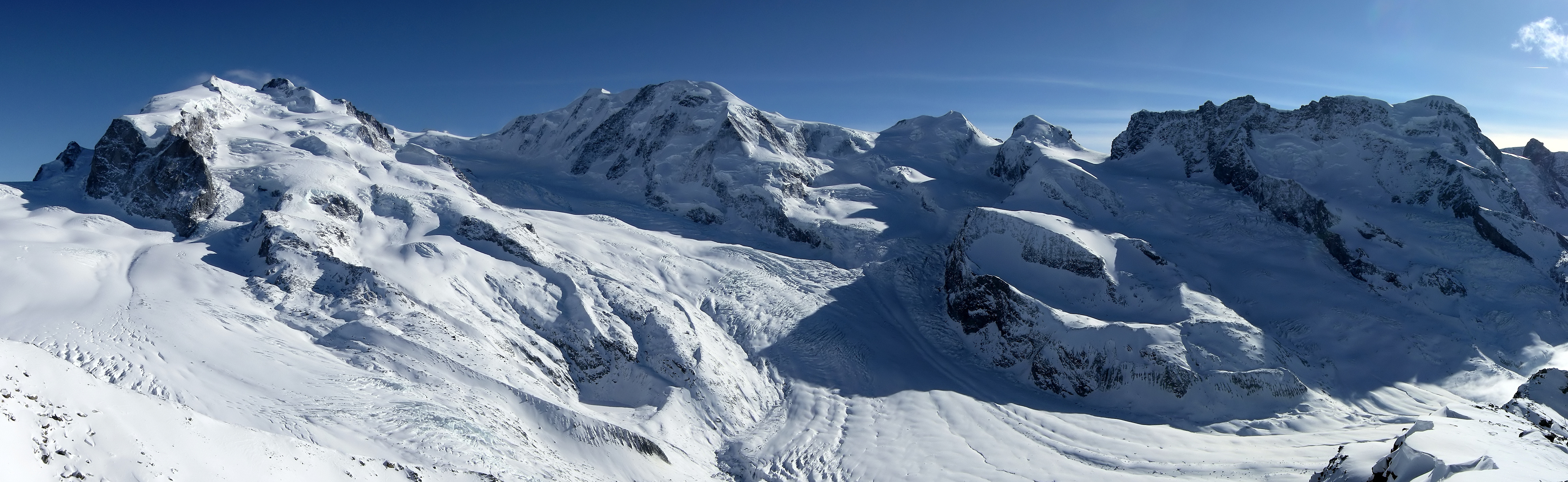
Panoramic view of the surroundings from 2010 showing (when enlarged) both the new hut and the old hut which was demolished in 2011, both left below the middle of the image. From left: Monte Rosa massif, Lyskamm, Castor, Pollux, Breithorn (see larger version with annotations in picture)

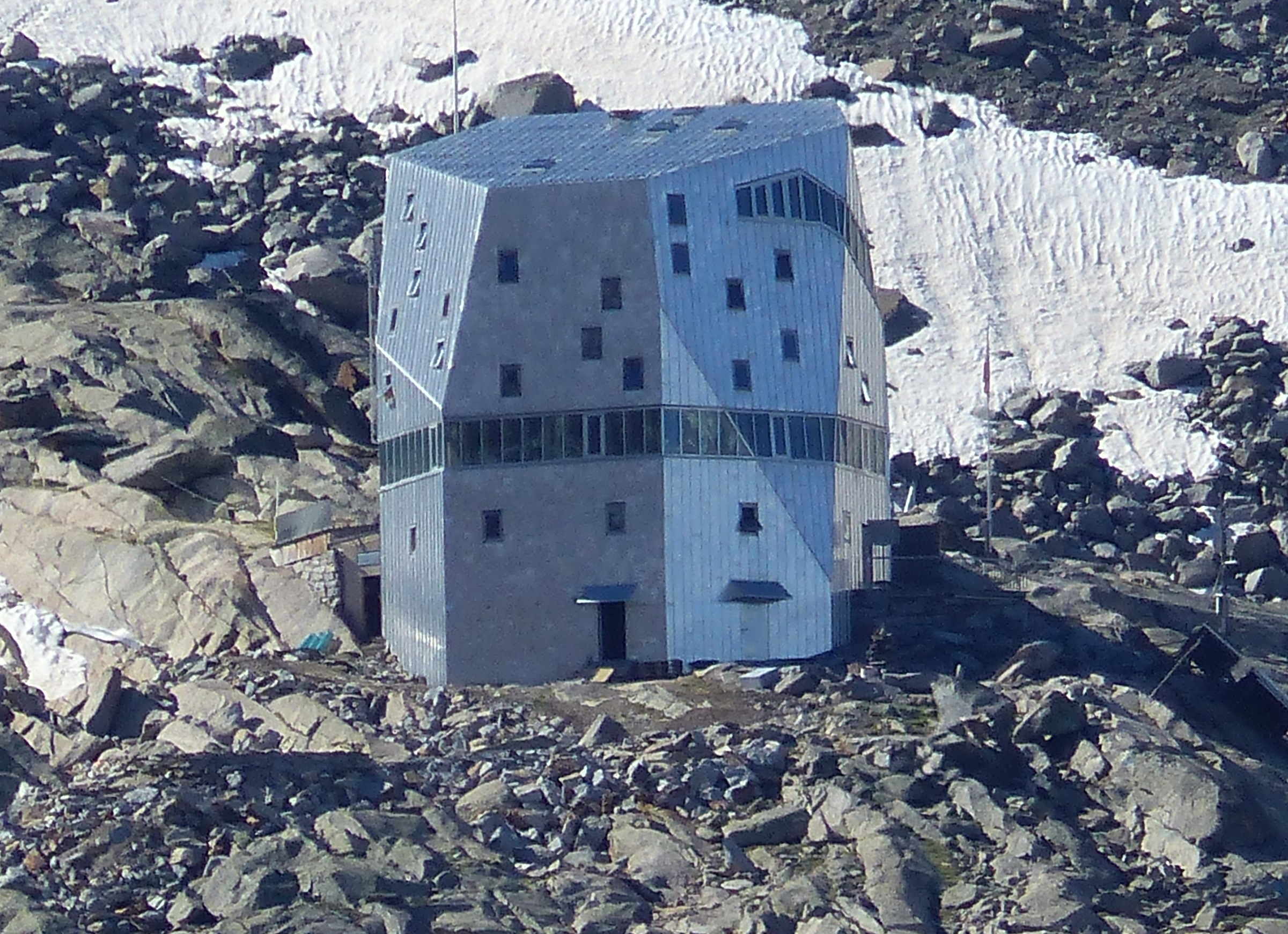
The hut in summer

A new hi-tech environmentally friendly mountain hut was designed by architect Andrea Deplazes of ETH Zurich and inaugurated in September 2009. The project of the Swiss Alpine Club, to mark the 150th anniversary of ETH Zurich, was launched in 2003. The construction materials prefabricated elements were transported by train to Zermatt and 3,000 helicopter trips were needed to take 35 workers and materials up to the glacier. The five-story polygonal building was built on stainless steel foundations with a spiral interior made out of wood, the exterior being covered with an aluminum shell. The building is designed to obtain 90 percent of its power needs from the sun. Excess energy was originally stored in valve-regulated lead-acid battery cells, which supply power when it is overcast. These batteries were replaced by Lithium-phosphate batteries in 2020. Water is collected from melting glaciers and stored in a large reservoir 40 metres above the hut. Bands of windows allow the sun to heat air inside the spiral building with the redistribution of thermal energy produced by visitors. The hut has capacity for 120 guests (as of July 2024).

Over the next few years the hut will become a research station for the students from the ETH Zurich. They will use it to investigate how to use energy and resources efficiently.

== Bibliography ==
- ETH Zurich, ed. (2010) New Monte Rosa Hut SAC. Self-Sufficient Building in the High Alps Zurich, gta, 2010. ISBN 978-3-85676-274-2
