= Valle Anzasca =

Valley in Piedmont, Italy

Coordinates: 45°59′00″N 8°07′35″E

Valle Anzasca (Anzasca Valley) is a valley of the Alps, situated in the Pennine range. The valley is drained by the Anza, a tributary of the Toce at Piedimulera. It is situated to the south of the Valle Antrona.

The valley is located in the Province of Verbano-Cusio-Ossola, in the Piedmont region of Italy. It is politically divided into six municipalities: Piedimulera, Calasca-Castiglione, Macugnaga, Bannio Anzino, Vanzone con San Carlo en Ceppo Morelli.

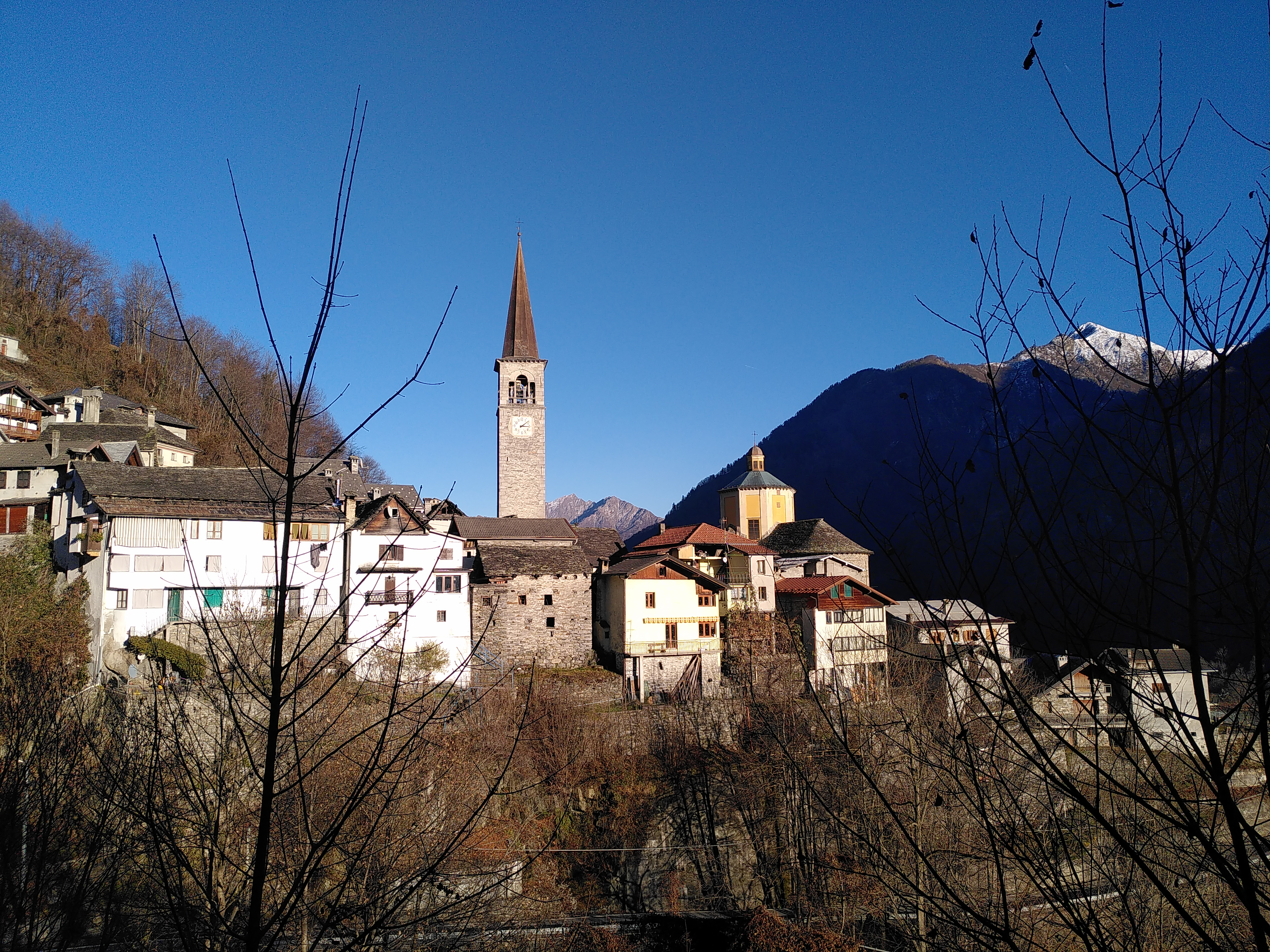
View of Antrogna (in Calasca-Castiglione) with the church called 'Cattedrale tra i boschi', in winter.

Macugnaga is located at the western most end of the Anzasca valley. It was founded in the 13th century by Walser people of Germanic origin, who came from the current Canton Valais in Switzerland. Traditional Walser culture and traditions still remain and there is also a Walser museum at the small settlement of Borca.

The highest mountain in the valley is the Monte Rosa Massif. The highest peak of the massif, amongst several peaks of over 4,000 m (13,000 ft), is the Dufourspitze (4,634 m, 15,203 ft), the second highest mountain in the Alps and western Europe, after Mont Blanc. The eastern face of the Monte Rosa towards the Valle Anzasca, at Macugnaga has a height of about 2,470 metres (8,100 ft) and is the highest mountain face of the Alps.

Skiing and hiking activities can be undertaken in the part of the Anzasca valley around Macugnaga. There is a path going from the hamlet of Pecetto to the Margherita Hut, the highest in Europe at 4,554 metres (14,941 ft).

== Maps ==
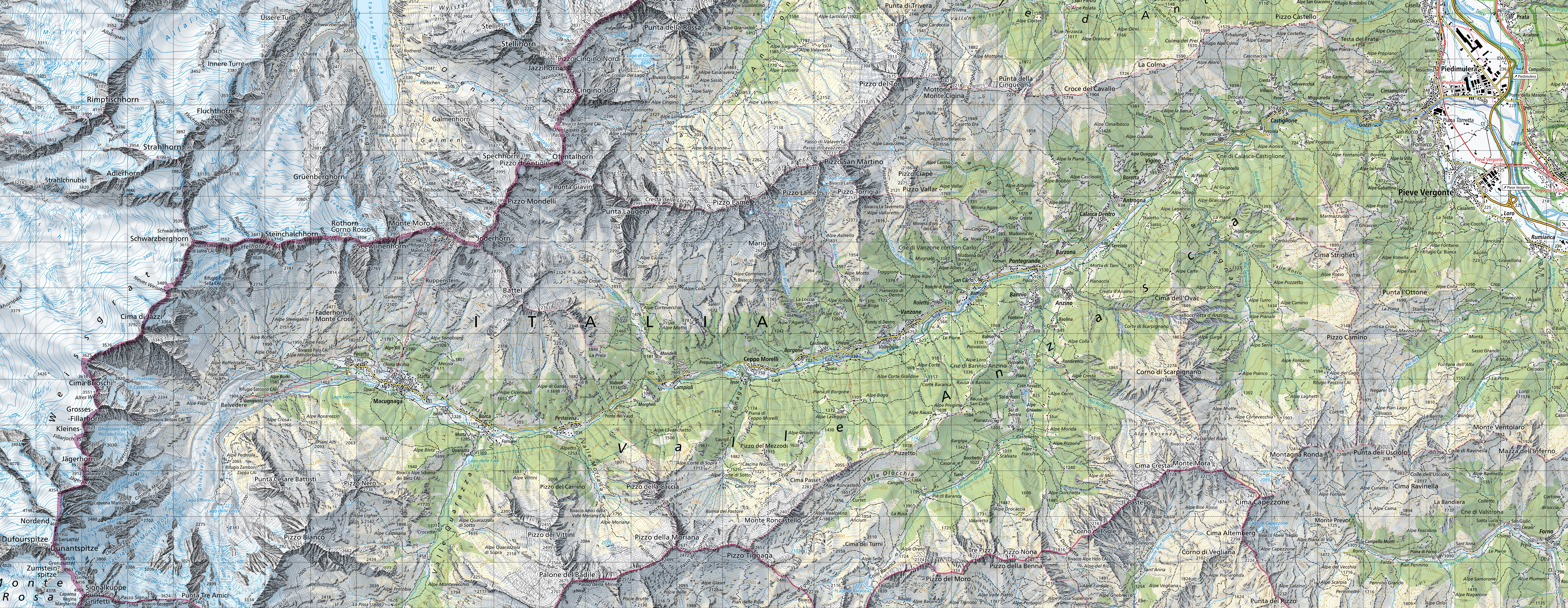
2015 Swisstopo map of the Anzasca Valley, Piedmont, Italy, showing the Italian-Swiss Border on the west, Valle Antrona on the north and Ossola Valley on the east.

== See also ==
- Valle Antrona
- Villadossola
