= Belvedere Glacier =

Glacier in Piedmont, Italy

- Italian: Ghiacciaio del Belvedere
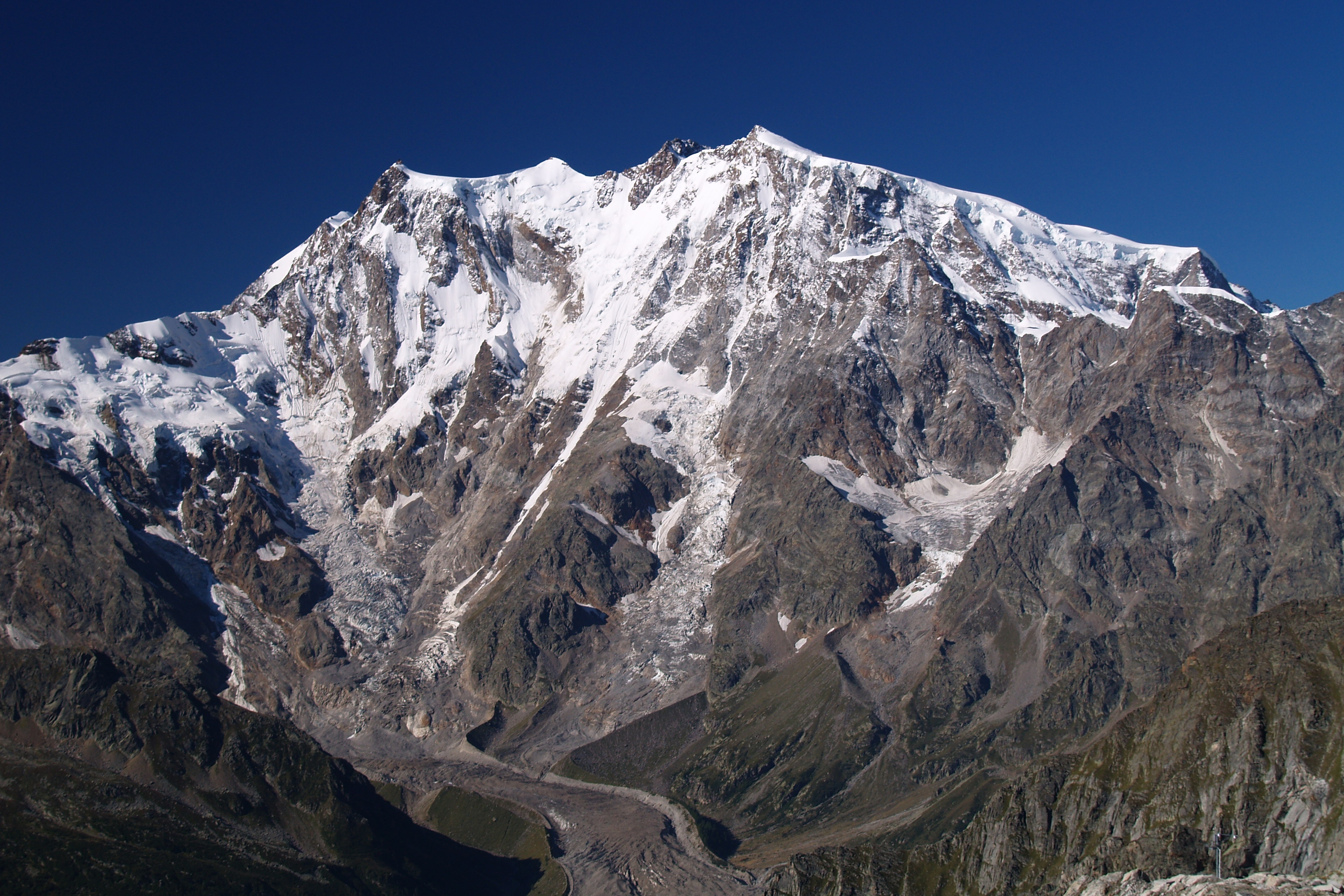
- The east face of Monte Rosa with the glacier at the bottom

- Location within Alps Location within Northern Italy
- Interactive map of Belvedere Glacier
- Type: Valley glacier
- Location: Valle Anzasca, Verbano-Cusio-Ossola (VB), Piedmont, Italy
- Coordinates: 45°57′02″N 7°54′35″E
- Terminus: Alpe Burki
- Status: receding

The Belvedere Glacier (Italian: Ghiacciaio del Belvedere) is a valley glacier located above Macugnaga of the Valle Anzasca in the region of Piedmont. The glacier lies at the base of the east face of Monte Rosa. It reaches approximately 2,200 metres (7,200 ft) above sea level at its highest point and terminates near the Alpe Burki at about 1,800 metres (5,900 ft). The glacier is mostly covered by rocks.

The glacier is fed by the snows and glaciers on the east side of Monte Rosa, including the Ghiacciaio del Monte Rosa, not to be confused with the Monte Rosagletscher on the Swiss west side, culminating above 4,500 metres, and also the Ghiacciaio Nord delle Loccie on the north side of the Punta delle Loccie (German: Punta Gruber, 3,497 m (11,473 ft)).

The glacier gives birth to the Anza, a tributary of the Toce River.
