= Zumsteinspitze =

Mountain in Switzerland

- Punta Zumstein
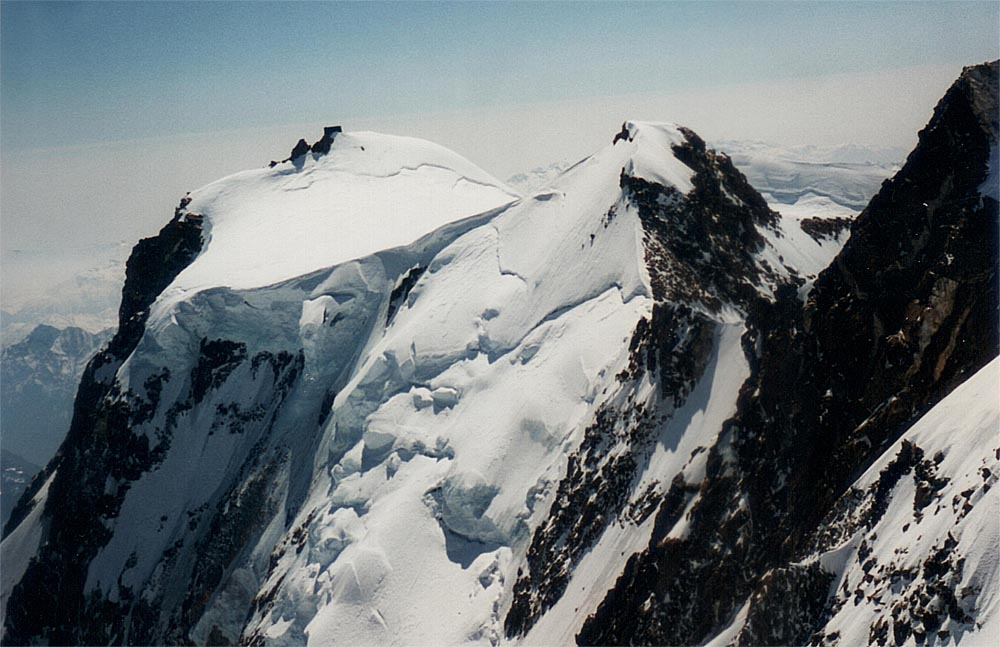
- The Zumsteinspitze (centre) with the Signalkuppe (left)

Highest point
- Elevation: 4,563 m (14,970 ft)
- Prominence: 112 m ↓ Grenzsattel
- Parent peak: Dufourspitze of Monte Rosa
- Isolation: 0.5 km → Grenzgipfel
- Coordinates: 45°55′55″N 7°52′17″E

Geography
- Location within Alps
- Location: Piedmont, Italy / Valais, Switzerland
- Parent range: Pennine Alps

Climbing
- First ascent: 1 August 1820 by Joseph and Johann Niklaus Vincent, Joseph Zumstein, Molinatti, Castel and porters unknown
- Easiest route: Lysjoch (4,248 m) - Colle Gnifetti (4,454 m)

The Zumsteinspitze (Punta Zumstein in Italian) (4,563 m) is a peak in the Pennine Alps on the border between Italy and Switzerland. It is a subpeak of Monte Rosa.

The summit lies between the Dufourspitze (to which it is joined by the Grenzsattel) and the Signalkuppe (to which it is joined by the Colle Gnifetti).

== Climbing ==
On 1 August 1820 the mountain was ascended by the brothers Joseph and Johann Niklaus Vincent, Joseph Zumstein, Molinatti, Castel and some unknown porters. During the expedition they thought they had climbed the highest peak of the Monte Rosa massif, but when they reached the summit they found out there was another "highest peak": the Dufourspitze. The Vincent brothers and Zumstein agreed to name the successfully climbed mountain "Cima de la belle Alliance", but Zumstein, forest inspector and member of the Royal Society of Science in Turin, managed to name the mountain after himself.

The first winter ascent was by E. Allegra and guides on 30 March 1902.

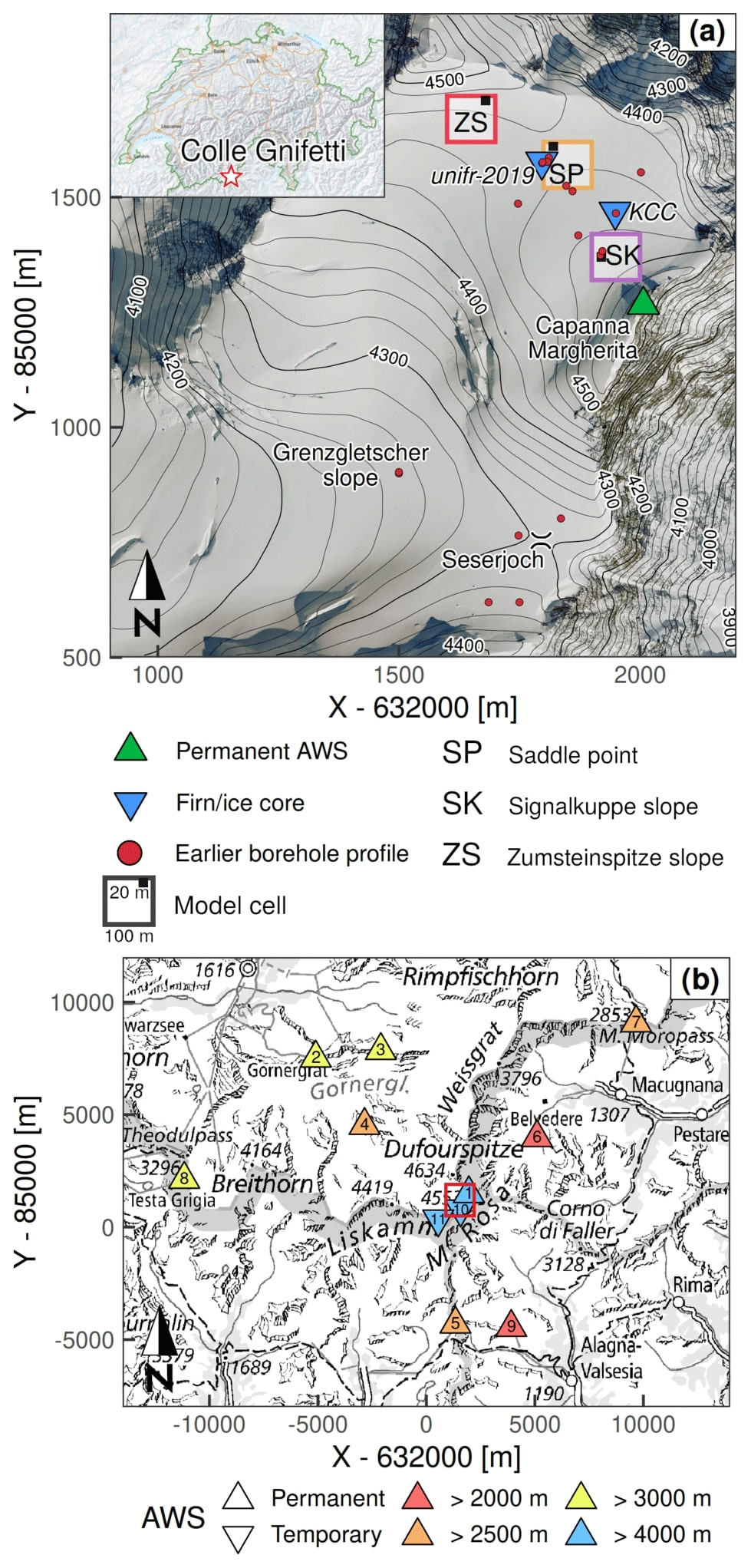
Location map for Zumsteinspitze and Colle Gnifetti and Monte Rosa overview map, 2021

== See also ==
- List of Alpine four-thousanders
- List of mountains of Switzerland named after people
