= Findeln =

Group of hamlets in the canton of Valais, Switzerland

Coordinates: 46°12′N 7°55′E

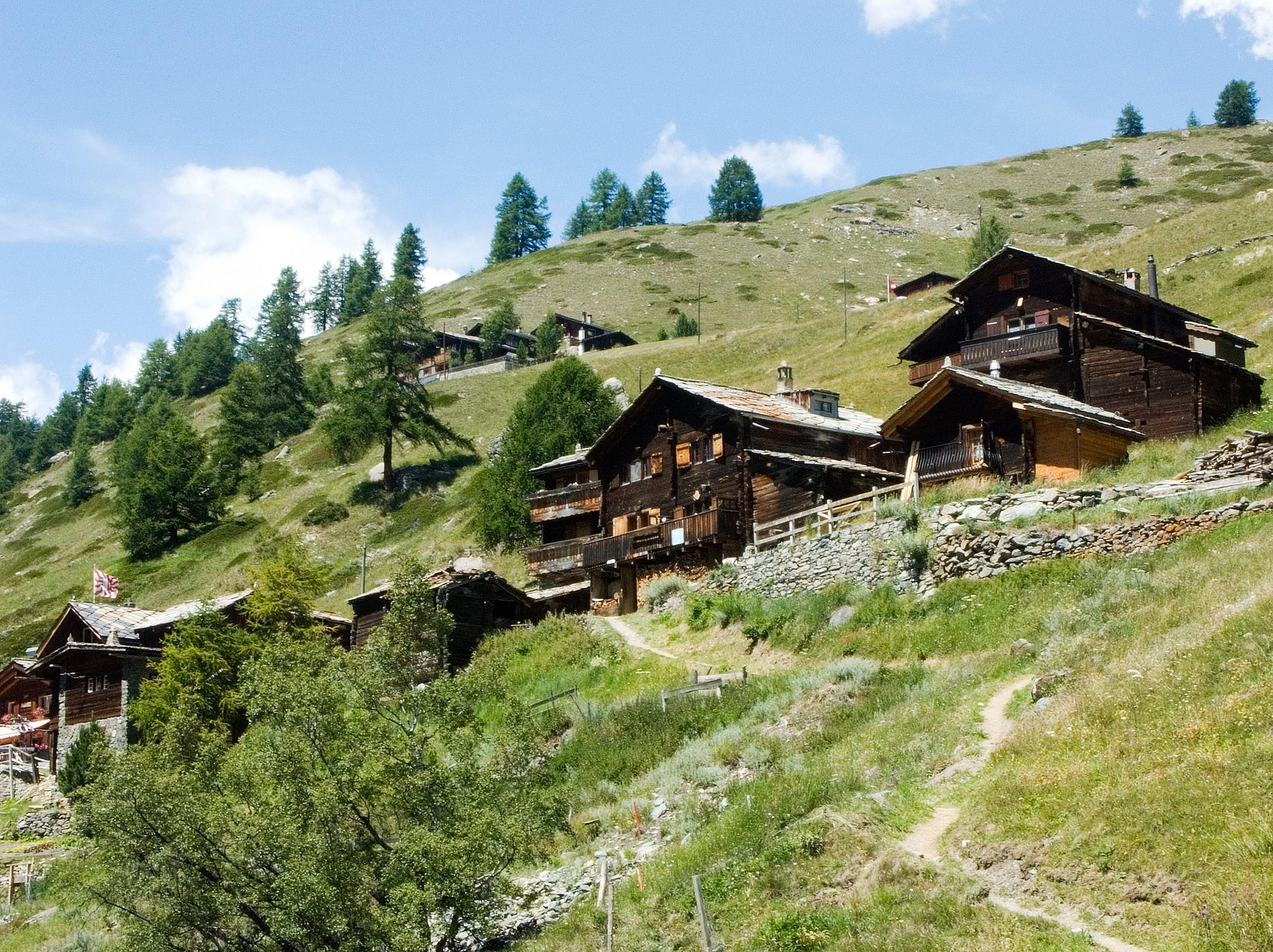
Findeln

Findeln is a group of hamlets above Zermatt in the canton of Valais. They are located on the south facing slopes of the Sunnegga–Unterrothorn–Oberrothorn mountains. The main hamlets are Eggen (2,177 m) and Ze Gassen (2,051 m), where there is a chapel. Both are easily accessible by the Zermatt–Sunnegga funicular.
