= Nordend =

Summit in the Pennine Alps

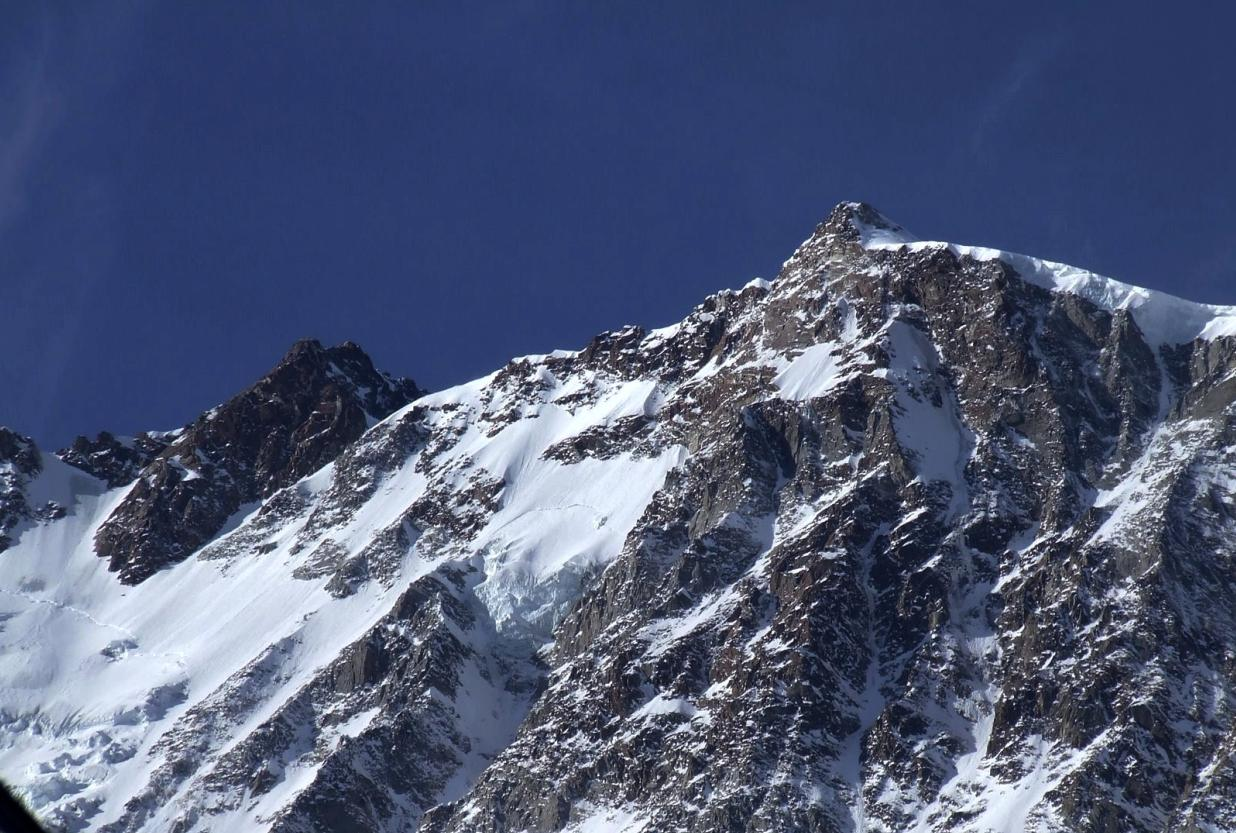
- East face

Highest point
- Elevation: 4,608 m (15,118 ft)
- Prominence: 89 m ↓ Silbersattel
- Parent peak: Dufourspitze of Monte Rosa
- Isolation: 0.575 km → Grenzgipfel
- Coordinates: 45°56′32″N 7°52′12″E

Naming
- English translation: North End
- Language of name: German

Geography
- Location within Alps Location within Piedmont Location within Switzerland
- Location: Swiss (Valais) - Italian (Piedmont) border
- Countries: Switzerland; Italy
- Topo map: Swiss Federal Office of Topography swisstopo

Geology
- Mountain type: peak

Climbing
- First ascent: 1861
- Easiest route: rock/snow/ice climb

Nordend (meaning north end in German) is a northern peak of the Monte Rosa Massif. Nordend is the fourth highest peak of the massif, after the Dufourspitze (4,634 m), the Dunantspitze (4,632 m) and the Grenzgipfel (4,618 m).

== See also ==
- List of Alpine four-thousanders
