= Grenzgipfel =

Mountain in Switzerland

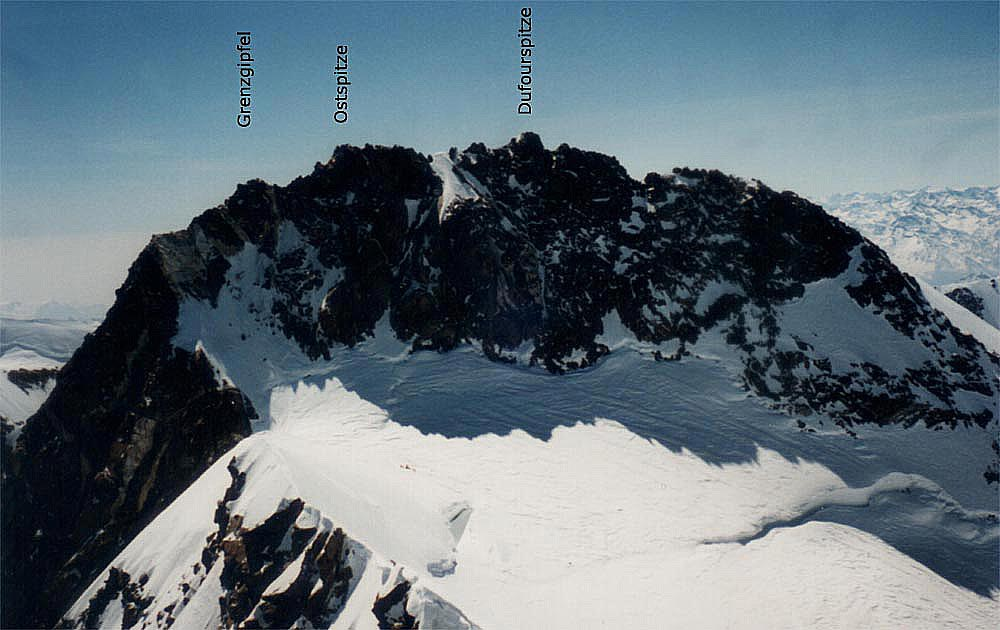
- The Grenzgipfel to the left of the Dunantspitze (formerly called Ostspitze) and the Dufourspitze (seen from Nordend)

Highest point
- Elevation: 4,618 m (15,151 ft)
- Prominence: 10 m (33 ft)
- Parent peak: Dufourspitze
- Listing: Italian region high point
- Coordinates: 45°56′12.3″N 7°52′04.8″E

Naming
- English translation: Border Summit
- Language of name: German

Geography
- Location within Alps
- Location: Italian (Piedmont) - Swiss (Valais) border
- Countries: Italy and Switzerland
- Parent range: Pennine Alps
- Topo map: Swiss Federal Office of Topography swisstopo

Climbing
- First ascent: 12 August 1848 by Johann Madutz and Matthias zum Taugwald.

The Grenzgipfel (4,618 m) (German for Border Summit) is a peak of Monte Rosa Massif (Pennine Alps), located on the border between Italy and Switzerland.

The Grenzgipfel is the highest summit on the Italian side of the Monte Rosa massif and the highest point of the entire border between Italy and Switzerland; it is also the culminating point of the Italian region of Piedmont and of the Ticino river drainage basin.

The closest locality is Macugnaga, which is located east of the Monte Rosa Massif.

== See also ==
- List of Italian regions by highest point
