= Punta Grober =

Mountain in Italy

- Punta delle Locie
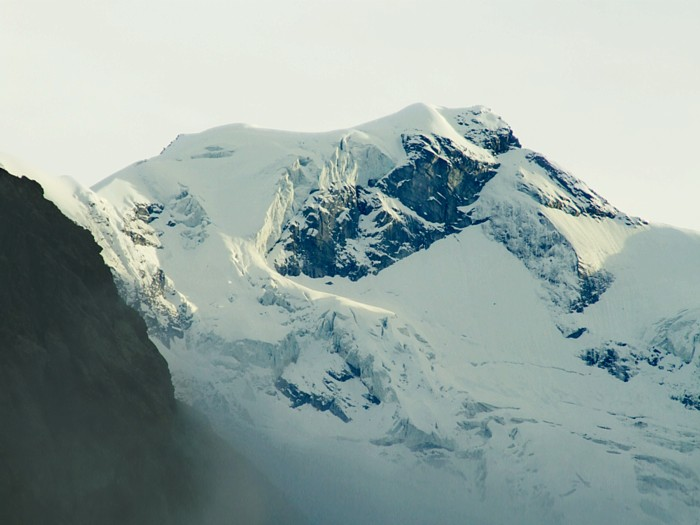

Highest point
- Elevation: 3,497 m (11,473 ft)
- Prominence: 179 m (587 ft)
- Coordinates: 45°55′19.83″N 07°55′18.48″E

Geography
- Location within Italy
- Location: Piedmont, Italy

Punta Grober is a mountain that is part of the Monte Rosa Alps in the Pennine Alps. It is located in Piedmont between the Valsesia and the Anzasca Valley.
