= Monte Rosa =

Massif in Switzerland and Italy

- Monte Rosa massif
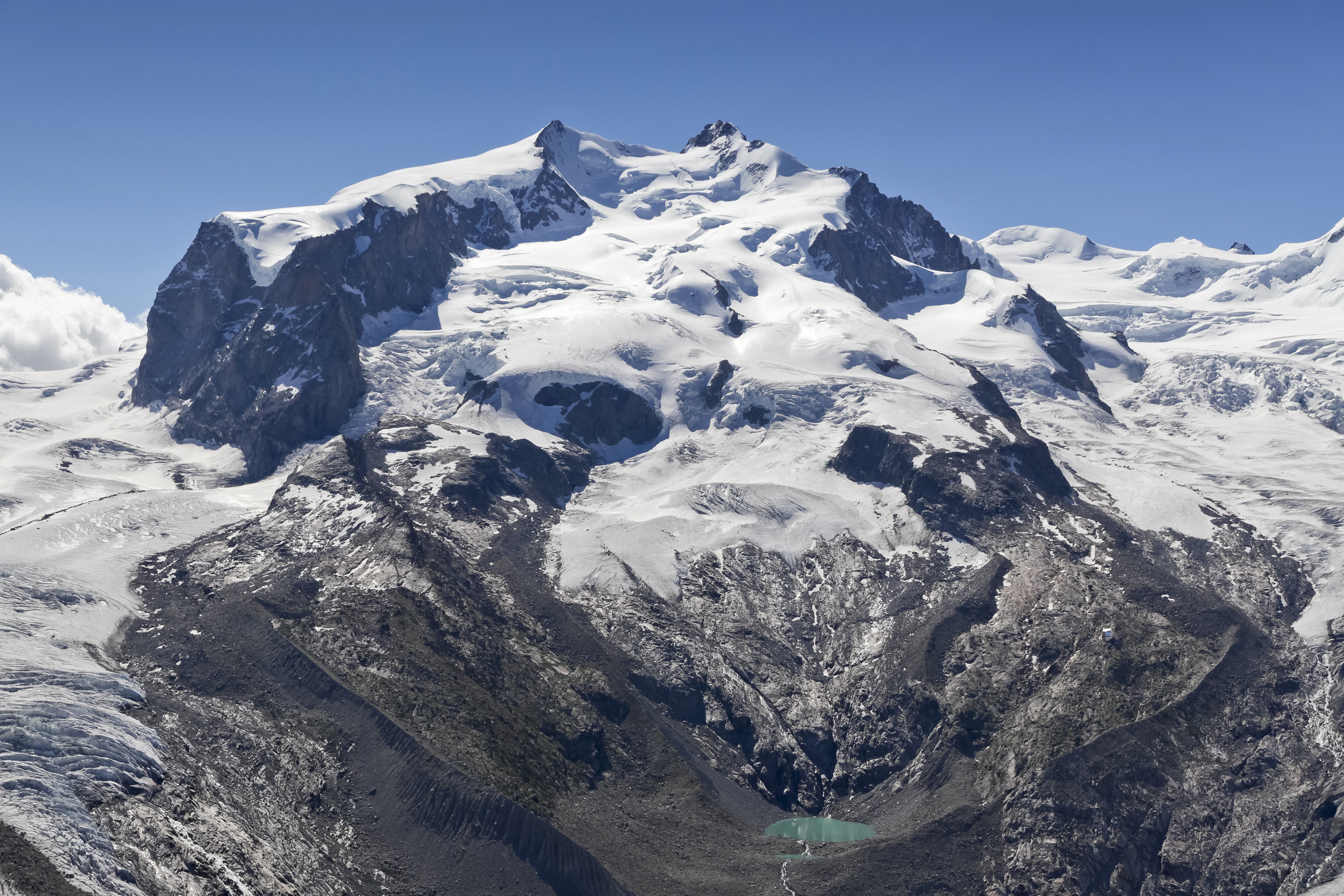
- Central Monte Rosa massif, with Dufourspitze to the south (right) and Nordend to the north (left), the Monte Rosa Glacier right below on its western wing, the upper Gorner Glacier on the left, and the Grenzgletscher to the right. The nearly vertical eastern wall (behind, not visible) has a height greater than the visible part in front.

Highest point
- Peak: Dufourspitze
- Elevation: 4,634 m (15,203 ft)
- Listing: Country high point Canton high point Ultra
- Coordinates: 45°56′13″N 07°52′00″E

Naming
- Native name: Mont Roeusa (Lombard); de Gletscher; de Gorner (Walser)

Geography
- Location within Switzerland
- Location of Mont Rosa Location in Switzerland/Italy
- Countries: Switzerland; Italy
- Canton, Regions: Valais; Piedmont; Aosta Valley
- Parent range: Pennine Alps, Western Alps
- Topo map: swisstopo: 3 – Suisse sud-ouest

Climbing
- First ascent: 1 August 1855 by Matthäus and Johannes Zumtaugwald, Ulrich Lauener, Christopher and James Smyth, Charles Hudson, John Birkbeck and Edward Stephenson.
- Easiest route: rock/snow/ice climb

Monte Rosa (Note: Italian: [ˈmonte ˈrɔːza]; Lombard: Mont Roeusa [ˌmũː(t) ˈrøːza]; Walser: de Gletscher or de Gorner; Piedmontese: Mont Reusa; French: Mont Rose [mɔ̃ ʁoz]; German: Monte Rosa.) is a mountain massif in the eastern part of the Pennine Alps, on the border between Italy (Piedmont and Aosta Valley) and Switzerland (Valais). The highest peak of the massif, amongst several peaks of over 4,000 m (13,000 ft), is the Dufourspitze (4,634 m, 15,203 ft), the second highest mountain in the Alps and western Europe, after Mont Blanc.

The group is on the watershed between the Rhône and Po basins and has a topographic prominence of 2,165 metres (7,103 ft), which is ranked fifth in the Alps.

The Monte Rosa massif has four faces: the Liskamm heading above the Val de Gressoney; the Valsesian face above Alagna Valsesia at the upper part of the Valle della Sesia; the east wall above Macugnaga in the Valle Anzasca; and the north-western flowing towards the Mattertal with Zermatt, which has one of the largest Alpine glaciers.

Its main summit, named Dufourspitze in honor of the surveyor Guillaume-Henri Dufour and wholly located in Switzerland, culminates at 4,634 m (15,203 ft) and is followed by the five nearly equally high subsidiary summits of Dunantspitze, Grenzgipfel, Nordend, Zumsteinspitze, and Signalkuppe. Some other peaks over 4,000 m (13,000 ft), such as Piramide Vincent, Punta Giordani, and Corno Nero, are wholly in Italy. Monte Rosa is the highest mountain in both Switzerland and the Pennine Alps and is also the second-highest mountain in the Alps and in Europe outside of the Caucasus.

The north-west side of the central Monte Rosa massif, with its enormous ice slopes and seracs, constitutes the boundary and upper basin of the large Gorner Glacier, which descends towards Zermatt and merges with its nowadays much larger tributary, the Grenzgletscher (lit. 'Border Glacier'), right below the Monte Rosa Hut on the lower end of the visible western wing. The Grenzgletscher is an impressive glacier formation between the western wing of the mountain and Liskamm, a ridge on its southwestern side on the Swiss-Italian border. On the eastern side, in Italy, the mountain falls away in an almost vertical 2,400-metre-high (7,900 ft) wall of granite and ice, the biggest in Europe, overlooking Macugnaga and several smaller glaciers.

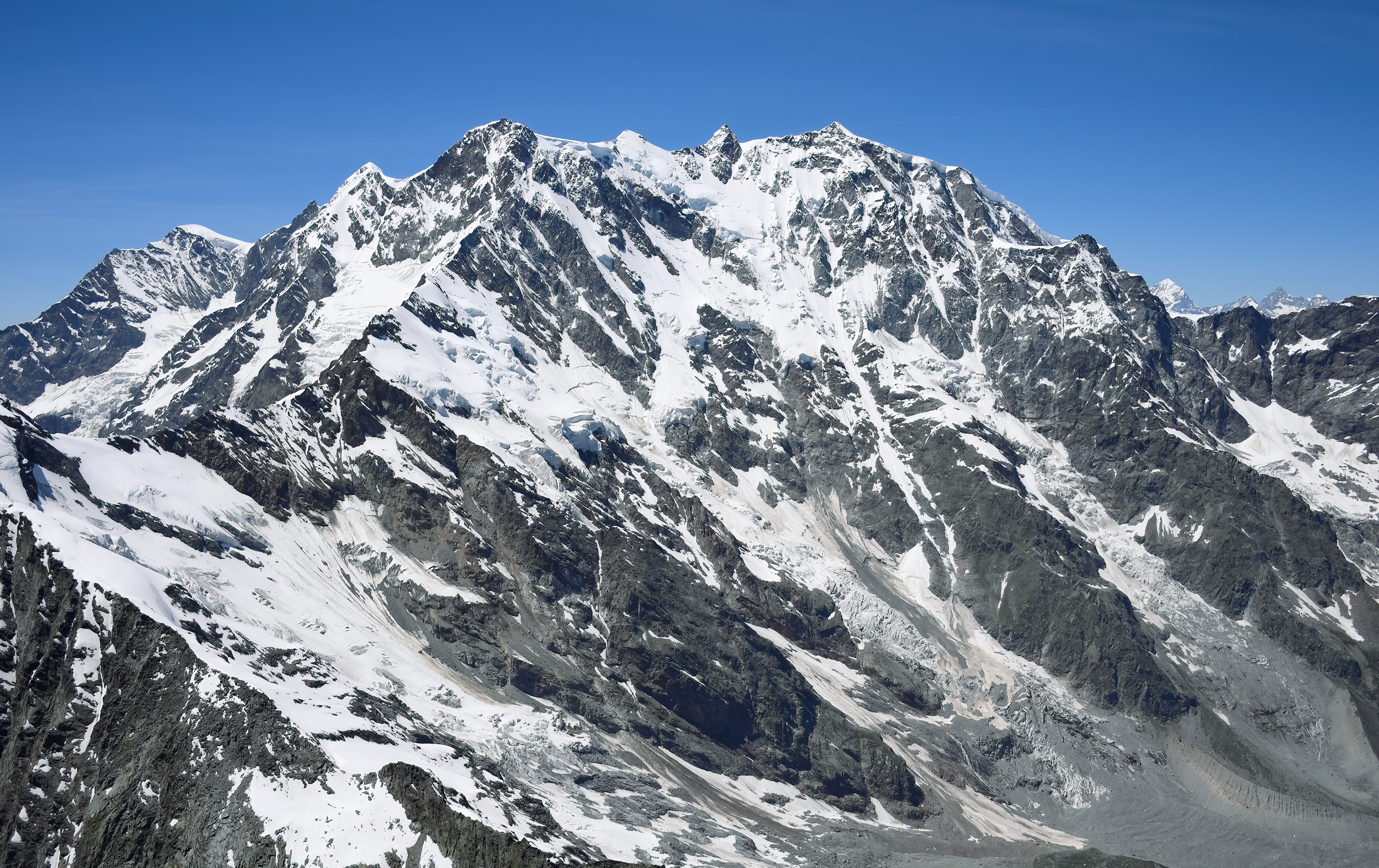
The Macugnaga wall rises ca. 2400 m above the upper Anzasca Valley and is one of the highest mountain walls in the Alps.

Monte Rosa was studied by pioneering geologists and explorers, including Leonardo da Vinci in the late fifteenth century and Horace-Bénédict de Saussure in the late eighteenth century. Following a long series of attempts beginning in the early nineteenth century, Monte Rosa's summit, then still called Höchste Spitze (lit. 'highest peak'), was first reached in 1855 from Zermatt by a party of eight climbers led by three guides. The great east wall was first climbed in 1872, from Macugnaga by Richard Pendlebury with his brother, W. M. Pendlebury, Rev. C Taylor and the guide Ferdinand Imseng.

Each summer, many climbers set out from the Monte Rosa Hut on the mountain's west wing for one of its summits via the normal route or for the Margherita Hut on the Signalkuppe (Italian: Punta Gnifetti), used as a research station. Many tourists and hikers also come to the Gornergrat on the northwest side of the massif to see a panorama that extends over some of the highest peaks in the Alps.

== Etymology ==
Although Italian rosa and French rose both mean 'pink' or 'rose', the name is unrelated to these words and is instead derived from the Franco-Provençal Valdôtain patois word rouése 'glacier'. On old maps as late as 1740, the mountain was named Monte Bosa and even Monte Biosa by the inhabitants of Val Sesia. The name Mon Boso, which appears in Leonardo da Vinci's notebooks, very likely designates the same mountain. From Zermatt the mountain was formerly known under the name Gornerhorn (lit. 'large/strong horn') in Walliser German, later shortened to de Gorner. In standard German, the name Gorner is still used for the western ridge protruding from the main mass (Gornergrat) and the glacier that lies at its foot (Gornergletscher) but not used for the mountain itself anymore. Nowadays, in German, the Italian name Monte Rosa is used instead (Monte Rosa-Gletscher, Monte Rosa-Hütte, etc.).

== Geography and climate ==
=== Geographic setting and description ===
Location in Europe

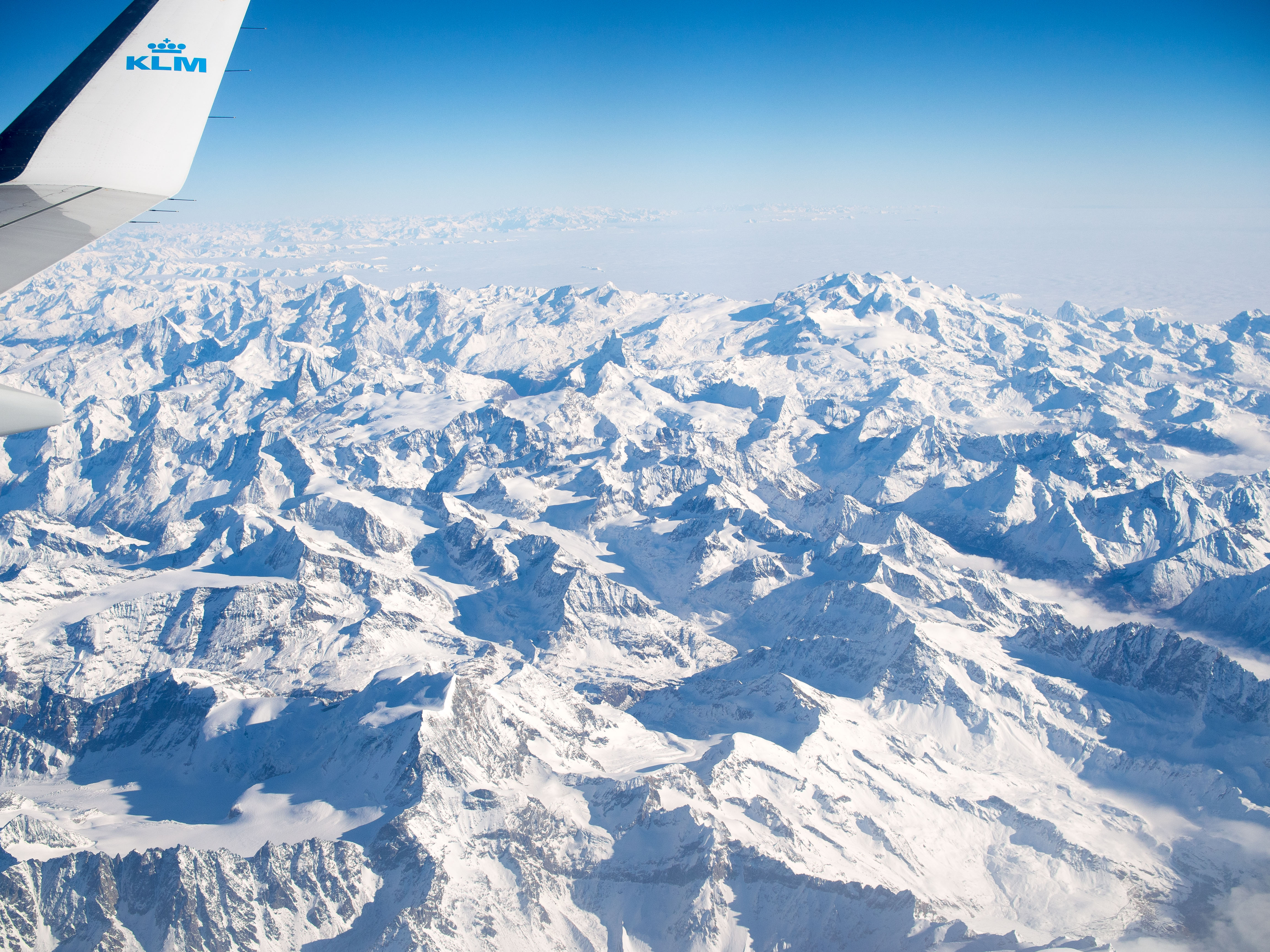
The Monte Rosa with Po Valley behind it, under a layer of clouds

Monte Rosa covers areas on both sides of the border between the Swiss canton of Valais and the Italian regions of Piedmont and Aosta Valley. The main summit of Monte Rosa is the Dufourspitze. On the Swiss side the town centre of Zermatt is about 13 km (8.1 mi) north-west and 3,000 m (9,800 ft) below it. On the Italian side of the massif are located 9 km (5.6 mi) north-east Macugnaga in the Valle Anzasca,11 km (6.8 mi) south-east-south Alagna Valsesia in the Valsesia and 13 km (8.1 mi) Gressoney-La-Trinité in the Val de Gressoney, respectively, away from the summit. The different sides of the mountain greatly differ from each other. The Swiss west side is almost completely covered by large glaciers, tributaries of the 57 km^{2} (22 sq mi) large Gorner Glacier, descending progressively with gentle slopes and forming a large uninhabited glacial valley. The Italian east side consists of a 2,400-metre-high (7,900 ft) wall overlooking Macugnaga, whose snows feed the Belvedere Glacier at its base. The southeast face, culminating at the Signalkuppe, overlooks the piedmontese Valsesia and the Val de Gressoney in the autonomous region of Aosta Valley.

The mountain is mainly covered by eternal snows and glaciers, except for its summit which is a rocky ridge orientated west–east, near to and perpendicular to the main watershed between Switzerland and Italy (the river basins of the Rhône and the Po on the Swiss and Italian side, respectively). The connecting point between them is the Grenzgipfel (English: Border Summit) right on the border, and therefore also the highest peak on the Italian side. Thus, Monte Rosa is the highest mountain in the Alps whose summit is not on the main alpine watershed, although it is off by only 150 metres (490 ft). The Silbersattel (English: Silver Saddle) and Grenzsattel (English: Border Saddle) are the passes located north and south to the summit. The three main secondary summits of Monte Rosa are (from north to south): the Nordend (4,609 m, 15,121 ft; north of the Dufourspitze), the Zumsteinspitze (4,563 m, 14,970 ft; south of the Dufourspitze) and the Signalkuppe (4,554 m, 14,941 ft; Italian: Punta Gnifetti), all of them being positioned right on the Swiss-Italian border. Other secondary summits are the Parrotspitze (4,432 m, 14,541 ft), the Ludwigshöhe (4,431 m, 14,537 ft) and the Vincentpiramid (4,215 m, 13,829 ft). All of them originally have German names, since even the Italian valleys used to be inhabited by German-based Walsers inhabited valleys.

Several perpendicular secondary ridges are connected to the central massif, dividing the glaciers that descend towards the Matter Valley. The ridge called Weissgrat connecting the Nordend with the Schwarzberghorn (Italian: Corno Nero) presents a wall of formidable precipices towards the east, but falls away in a gentle slope to the west. For a breadth of a few kilometres the upper snow-fields of the Weissgrat lie almost unbroken upon this slope, but as they begin to descend towards the Matter Valley they are divided into two ice streams (the upper Gorner Glacier and the Findel Glacier) by a ridge which gradually emerges from the névé, and finally presents a rather bold front to the glaciers on either side. The highest points of this ridge, appearing insignificant by contrast with the grand objects around, are the Stockhorn (3,532 m, 11,588 ft) and the lower Gornergrat at 3,090 m (10,138 ft). On their south sides is the lower Gorner Glacier, formed by the confluence of all the major (Gornergletscher and Grenzgletscher) and minor tributaries descending from the north, west and south sides of the central Monte Rosa massif, while on the north side, the Findel Glacier descends near the hamlet of Findeln.

Monte Rosa is one of the high mountains surrounding the 40-kilometre-long (25 mi) Matter Valley south of Stalden. On the southwest to west are Liskamm, Zwillinge with Castor and Pollux, the Breithorn and the Matterhorn; on the north are the Weisshorn and the Dom. The Gornergrat summit, lying 8 km (5.0 mi) on the north-west at 3,100 metres (10,200 ft), is a popular viewpoint of the massif, since it is accessible by train from Zermatt, using the highest open-air railway line in Europe.

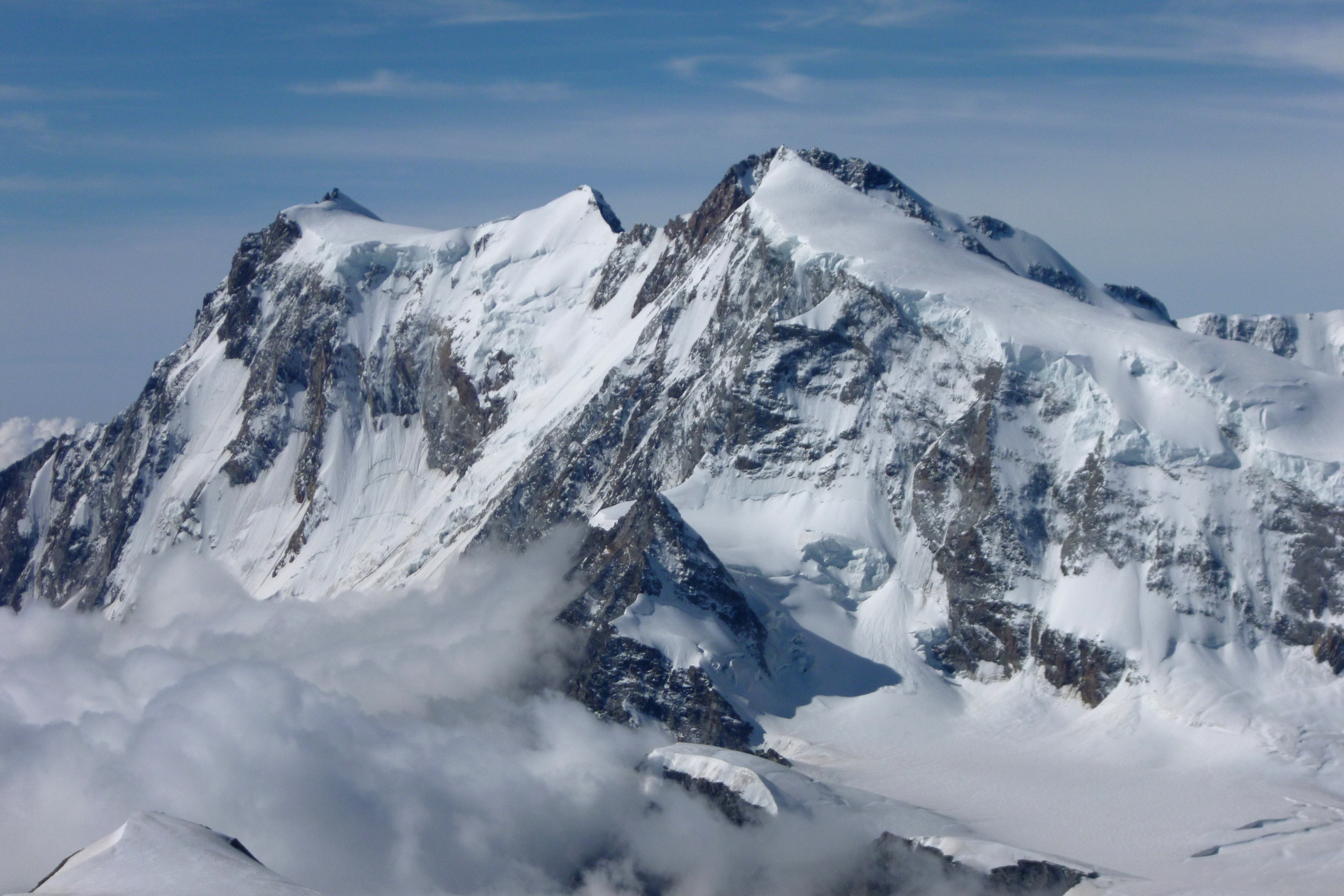
The east and north side with the 600-metre-high (2,000 ft) north face of the Nordend (as seen from the Strahlhorn)

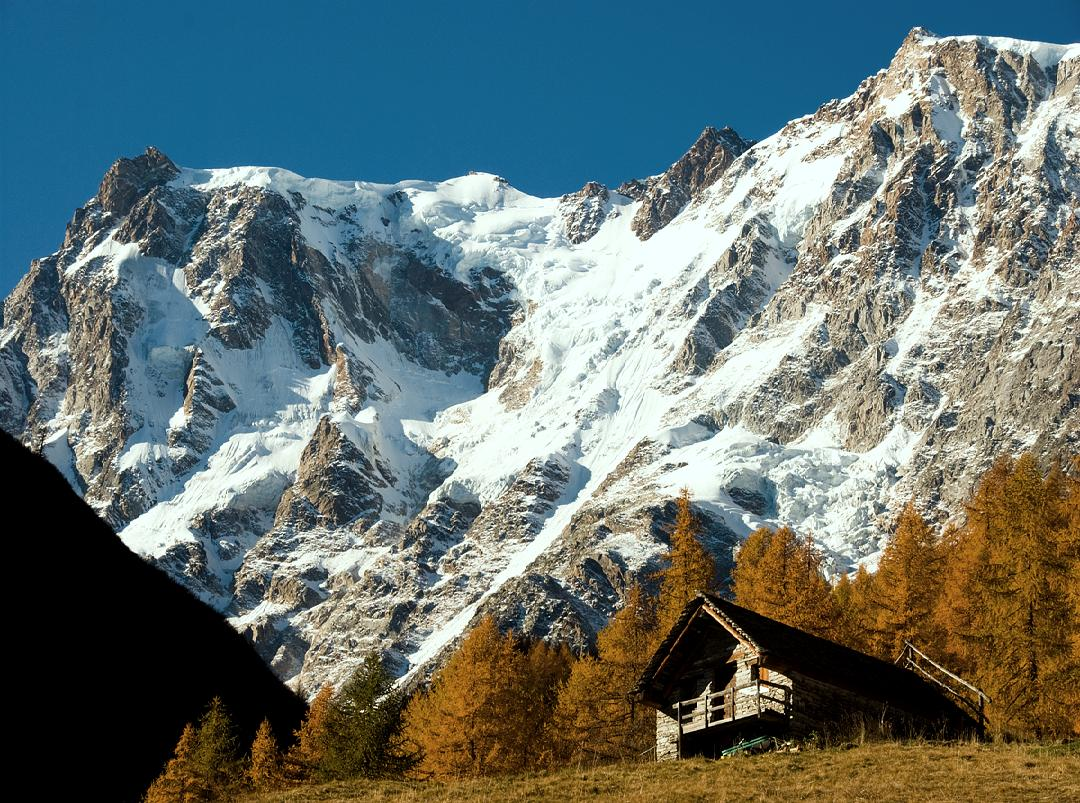
Monte Rosa's 2,400-metre-high (7,900 ft) east face, as seen from the upper end of Valle Anzasca (Piedmont, Italy)

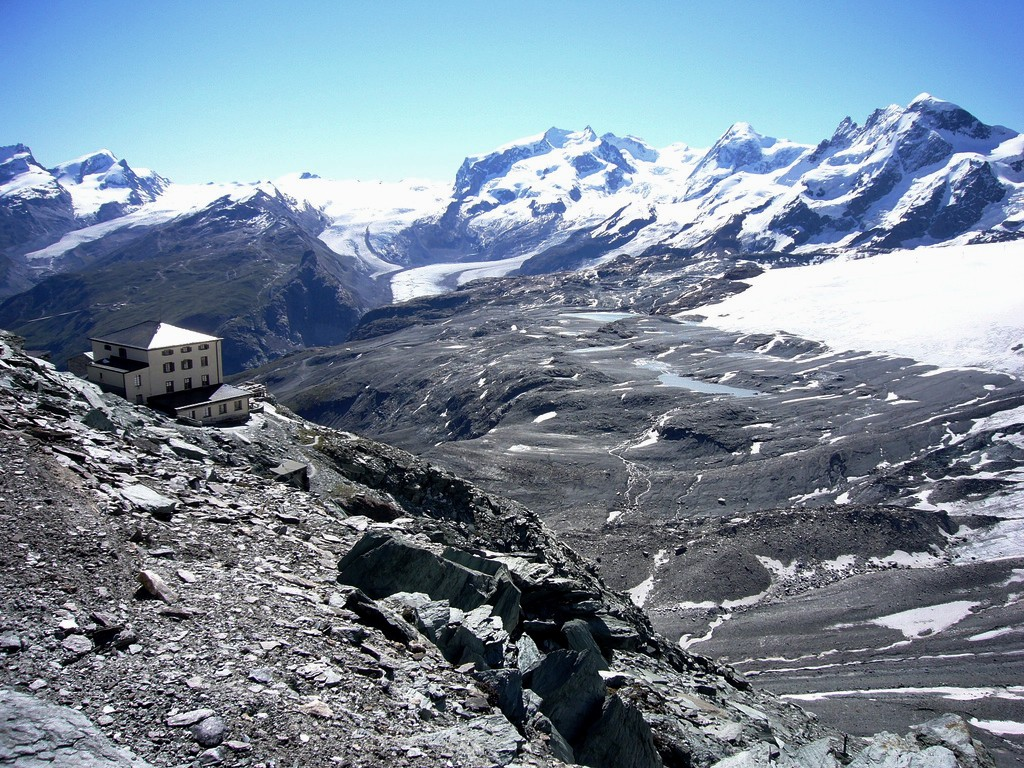
The west side as seen at a distance of 15 km (9.3 mi) from Hörnlihütte, at the foot of the Matterhorn, 3,260 m (10,700 ft) (in the back from left to right): Rimpfischhorn, Strahlhorn, Findelgletscher, Stockhorn (and Gornergrat below it), upper (on the north side) and lower (on the west side) Gornergletscher – the central Monte Rosa massif – Grenzgletscher, Liskamm and several Breithorn peaks on the south side (2008)

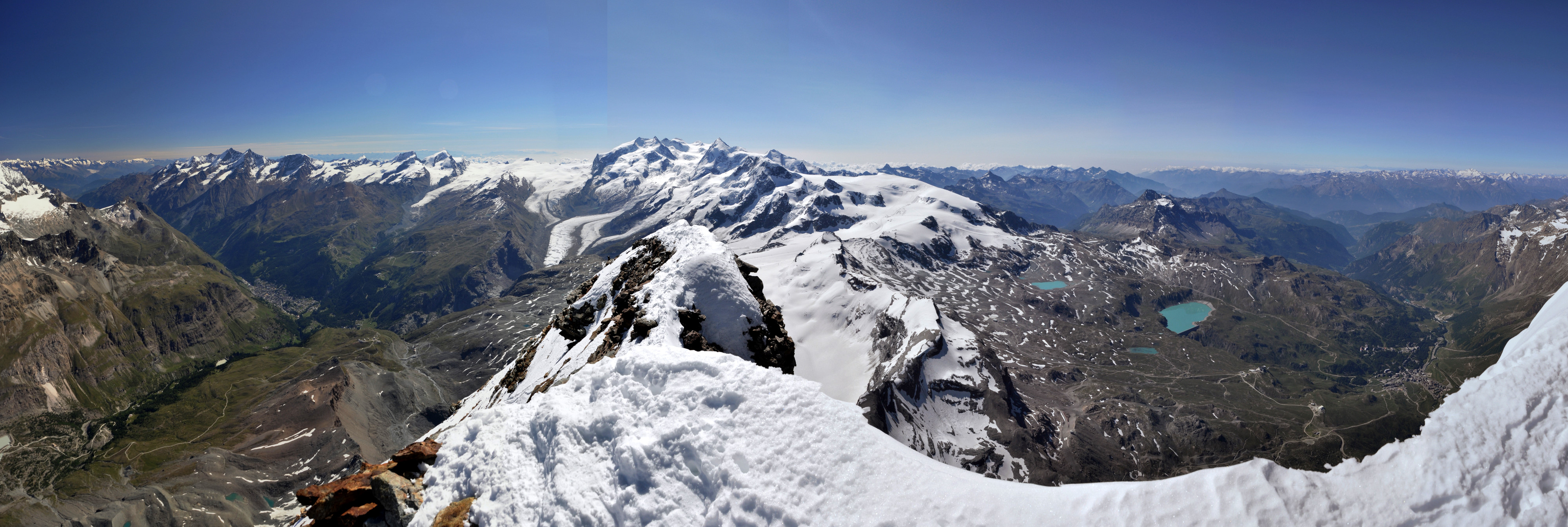
Monte Rosa viewed from the summit of the Matterhorn (centre), with the valleys of Mattertal (left) and Valtournenche (right) alongside it

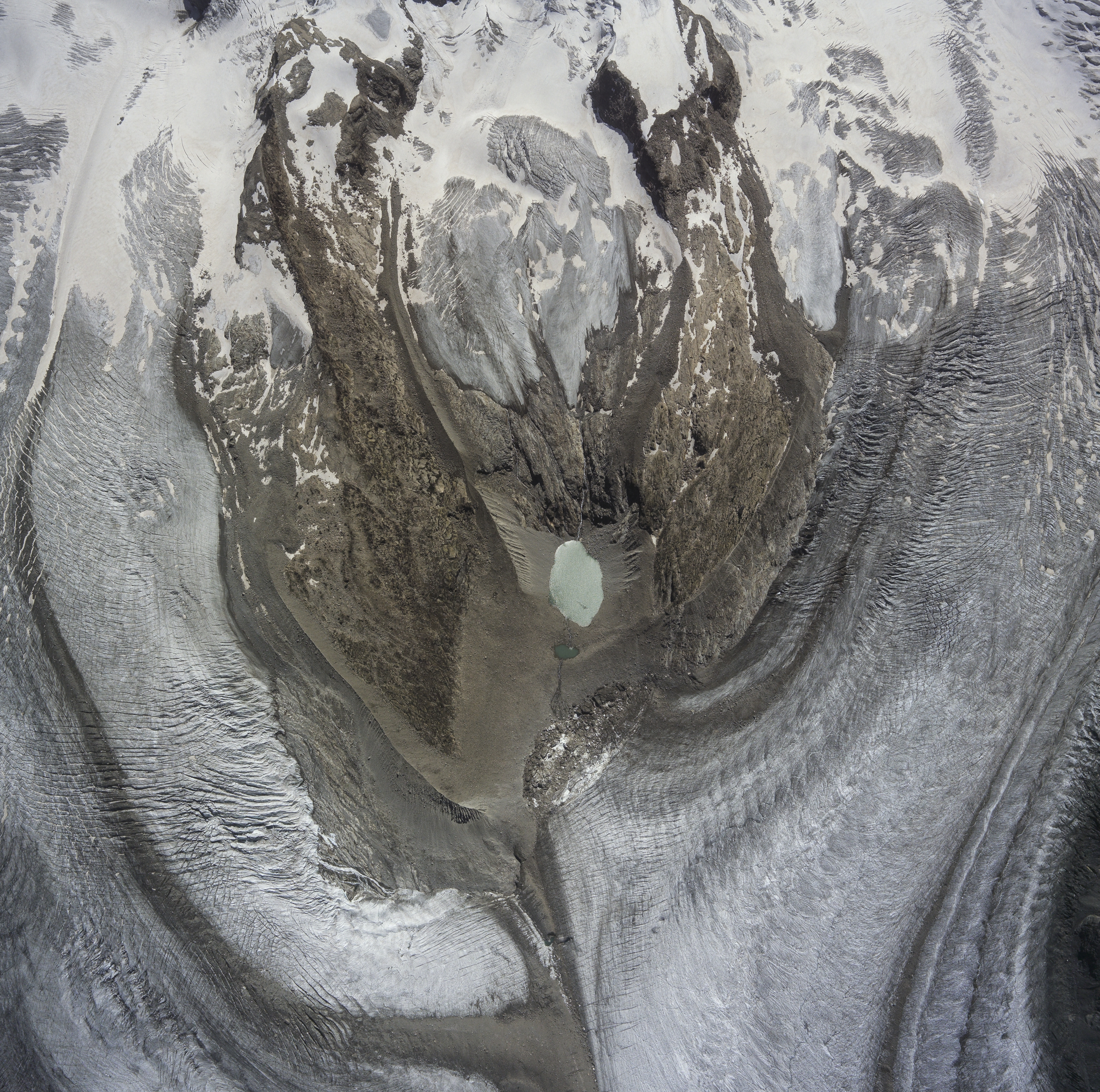
Aerial photo of Monte Rosa massif with Gornergletscher on the left and Grenzgletscher on the right. The green spot in the middle is the glacier lake Gornersee (2.599 m)

=== Geography ===
The extended range of Monte Rosa, which appears to originate in the intersection of two axes of great elevation, throws out a number of ridges that radiate afar and gradually subside into the plain of northern Italy, covering a relatively large area. There is no convenient mode of subdividing the range. However, the natural limits of the district can be defined on the north side by the two branches of the Visp torrent. Following the west branch through the Mattertal, crossing the Theodul Pass, descending by the Valtournanche to Châtillon and to Ivrea, and passing around the base of the mountains by Arona, along Lake Maggiore, and up the valley of the Toce, to Vogogna, then ascending by the Val Anzasca to the Monte Moro Pass, the circuit is completed by the descent through the Saastal to Stalden. Within the line so traced, exceeding 450 km (280 mi) in length, all the ranges properly belonging to this group are included.

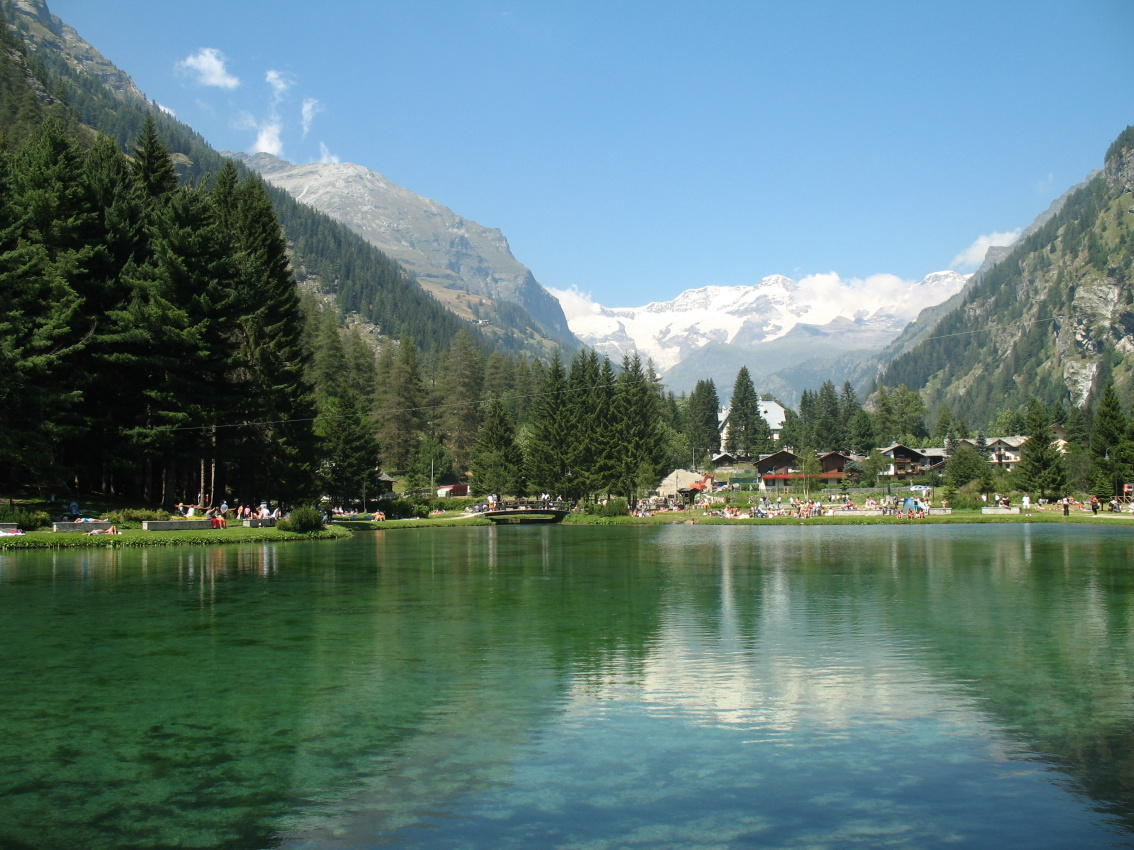
View from the valley of Gressoney

The direction of the ranges and the depressions offers a marked contrast to that prevailing throughout the adjoining regions of the Alps. Unless in a small part of the Italian valleys, the direction here is either parallel or perpendicular to the meridian. Monte Rosa itself lies near the intersection of a great north and south ridge, extending from the Balfrin through the Mischabelhörner, and the highest peaks of the mountain itself, to the Vincent Pyramide, and thence through the range that bounds the Valle di Gressoney, nearly to Ivrea, with the transverse range lying between the Dent d'Herens and the Pizzo Bianco near Macugnaga. The minor ridges on the north side of the border are parallel to this latter range, with their corresponding depressions occupied by the glaciers of Gorner and Findelen.

On clear days, the mountainous massif of Monte Rosa provides a striking view from the Po plain, particularly its upper reaches in western Lombardy and eastern Piedmont. It dominates the horizon, towering between other lesser Alpine peaks as a prominent, multi-pointed, razor-sharp bulge, its permanent glaciers shining under the sun.

"It is the opinion of many of the most competent judges, that for grandeur, beauty, and variety, the valleys descending from Monte Rosa are entitled to preeminence over every other portion of the Alps, and perhaps, if we regard the union of those three elements, over every other mountain region in the world." – John Ball (first president of the Alpine Club)

The massif is the border between Switzerland and Italy, though glacial melt has caused some alterations to the border. These changes were ratified by the two countries in 2009 and will continue to be subject to change as melting continues.

=== Geology ===
The entire massif consists mainly of granite and granite gneiss (a metamorphic rock with foliations). The Monte Rosa Nappe lies below the Zermatt-Saas zone and is part of the Penninic nappes in the Briançonnais microcontinent zone, although its paleographic origin is controversial and is sometimes assigned to the Sub-Penninic nappes. Rocks in the paragneiss of the Monte Rosa Nappe record eclogite-facies metamorphism. The deformation of the Monte Rosa granites indicates a depth of subduction of about 60 km (40 mi). They were brought to the surface by tectonic uplift, which still continues today. The summit is a sharp, jagged edge of mica schist connected by an arête with the Nordend, but cut off from the Zumsteinspitze to the south by nearly vertical rocks about 120 m (390 ft) in height.

=== Climate ===
Being the highest point in Switzerland, Monte Rosa is also one of the most extreme places. The average air pressure is about half of that of the sea level (56%) and the temperature can reach as low as −40 °C (−40 °F). Owing to the frequent prevalence of a high wind from the east or north-east, and the slow pace at which it is possible to move when near the top, precautions against cold are particularly necessary when climbing Monte Rosa. The snow line is located at about 3,000 m (9,800 ft).

== Tourism ==
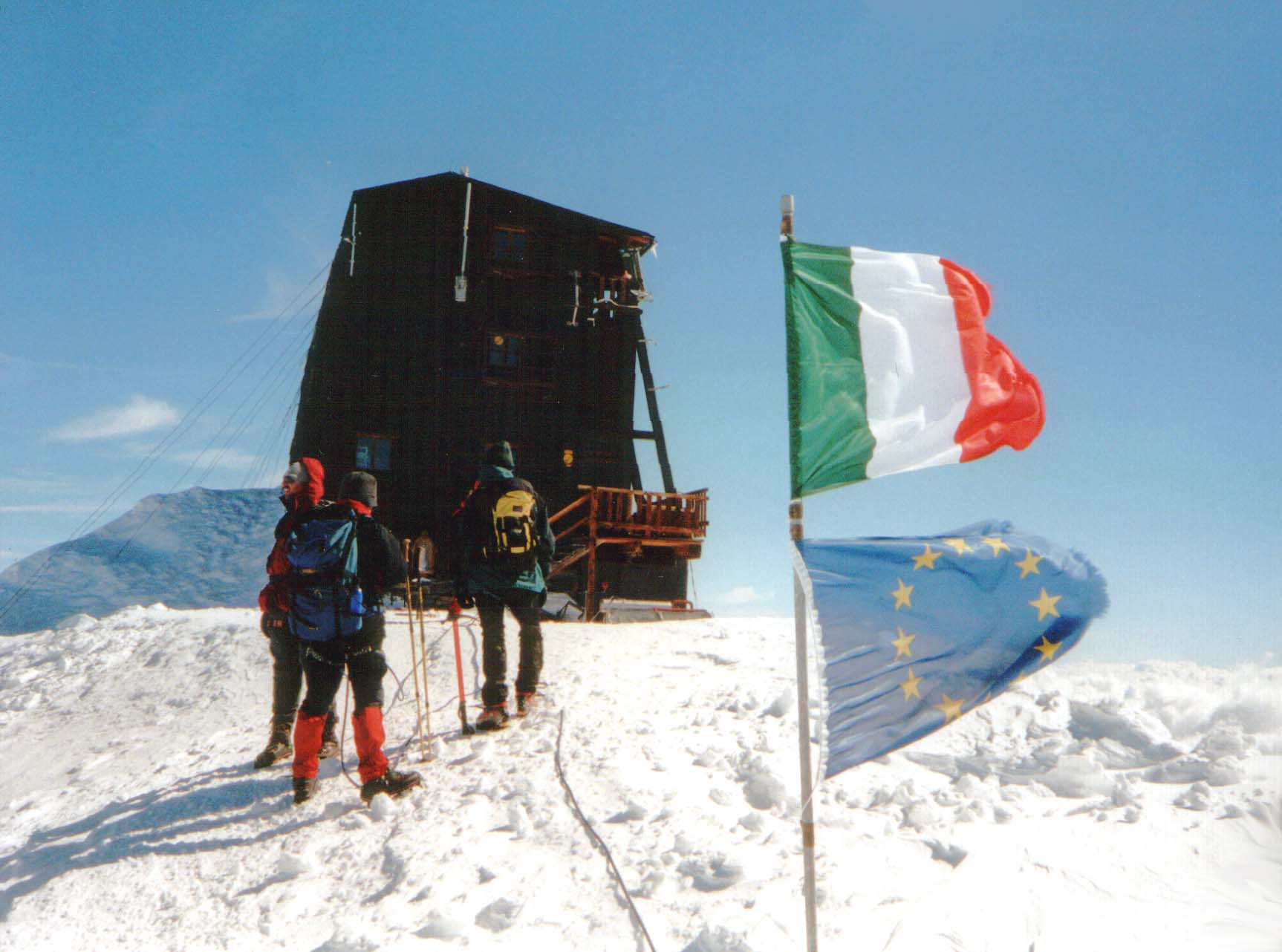
Regina Margherita Hut on Signalkuppe in August 2002

The Monte Rosa massif is popular for mountaineering, hiking, skiing and snowboarding. It hosts several ski resorts with long pistes. Plateau Rosa, about 3,500 metres (11,500 ft) high above sea level, is a summer ski resort, with snow all year round due to the altitude. The Plateau Rosa is connected via aerial tramway to Cervinia and to Zermatt via the Klein Matterhorn. The western fringes of the massif reach the Zermatt ski domain. Gressoney, Champoluc, Alagna Valsesia and Macugnaga (under the east face, intensely glaciated and 2,500 metres (8,200 ft) high) are the main mountain and ski resorts that surround Monte Rosa along its southern side. Monte Rosa is not technically difficult to climb, but can be quite dangerous due to its great altitude and sudden weather changes, as well as crevasses in its extensive glaciers – one of the major glaciated areas in the Alps. Many alpinists who died climbing Monte Rosa are buried in the Old Church cemetery in Macugnaga.

=== Trekking ===
Trekkers can complete the Monte Rosa tour in about 10 days. The circuit follows many ancient trails that have linked the Swiss and Italian valleys for centuries. The circuit includes larch forests, alpine meadows, balcony trails and a glacial crossing. It connects seven valleys embracing different cultures: the German-speaking high Valais, the Walser German and Arpitan/French-speaking Aosta Valley, and the valleys of Lombardy and Piedmont.

== The Monte Rosa massif ==
=== Peaks ===
Usually, these peaks are considered to be part of the Monte Rosa massif:

| Peak | Elevation (m/ft) |
|---|---|
| Dufourspitze | 4,634 metres (15,203 ft) |
| Dunantspitze | 4,632 metres (15,197 ft) |
| Grenzgipfel | 4,618 metres (15,151 ft) |
| Nordend | 4,609 metres (15,121 ft) |
| Zumsteinspitze | 4,563 metres (14,970 ft) |
| Signalkuppe | 4,554 metres (14,941 ft) |
| Parrotspitze | 4,432 metres (14,541 ft) |
| Ludwigshöhe | 4,341 metres (14,242 ft) |
| Corno Nero (Schwarzhorn) | 4,322 metres (14,180 ft) |
| Vincentpiramid | 4,215 metres (13,829 ft) |
| Balmenhorn | 4,167 metres (13,671 ft) |
| Giordanispétz | 4,046 metres (13,274 ft) |
| Jägerhorn | 3,970 metres (13,020 ft) |
| Roccia Sesia | 3,570 metres (11,710 ft) |
| Punta delle Locie/Punta Grober | 3,497 metres (11,473 ft) |
| Punta Vittoria | 3,435 metres (11,270 ft) |
| Punta Tre Amici | 3,426 metres (11,240 ft) |
| Stolemberg | 3,202 metres (10,505 ft) |
| Corno del Camoscio/Gemschhòre | 3,026 metres (9,928 ft) |

=== Glaciers ===
Usually these glaciers are considered to be part of the Monte Rosa massif:

- Gornergletscher (English: Gorner Glacier)
- Monte-Rosa-Gletscher (English: Monte Rosa Glacier)
- Grenzgletscher (English: Border Glacier)
- Findelgletscher (English: Findel Glacier)
- Lysgletscher (English: Lys Glacier)
- Endregletscher (English: Endre Glacier)
- Ghiacciaio di Bors (English: Bors Glacier)
- Ghiacciaio delle Piode (English: Piode Glacier)
- Ghiacciaio della Sesia (English: Sesia Glacier)
- Ghiacciaio delle Vigne (English: Vigne Glacier)
- Ghiacciaio Sud delle Loccie (English: South Glacier of Loccie)
- Ghiacciaio Nord delle Loccie (English: North Glacier of Loccie)
- Ghiacciaio del Signal (English: Signal Glacier)
- Ghiacciaio del M. Rosa (English: M. Rosa Glacier)
- Ghiacciaio del Nordend (English: Nordend Glacier)
- Ghiacciaio del Belvedere (English: Belvedere Glacier)

== Panorama ==
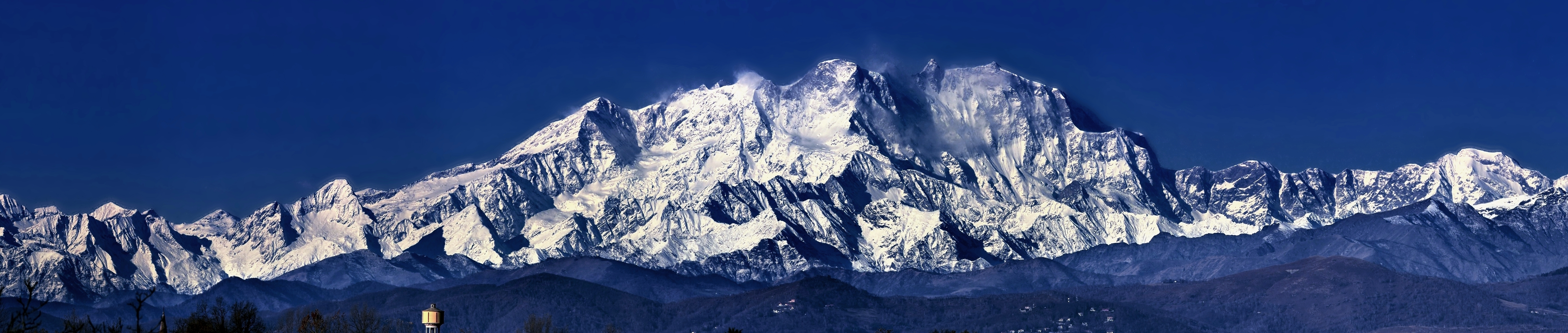
The south-east side of Monte Rosa from near Lake Maggiore, rising about 4,500 metres (14,800 ft) above the plains of Lombardy

== See also ==
- List of mountains of Valais
- High Alps
- List of most isolated mountains of Switzerland
