= Dufourspitze =

Highest point in Switzerland

- Pointe Dufour (French); Punta Dufour (Italian); Piz da Dufour (Romansh)
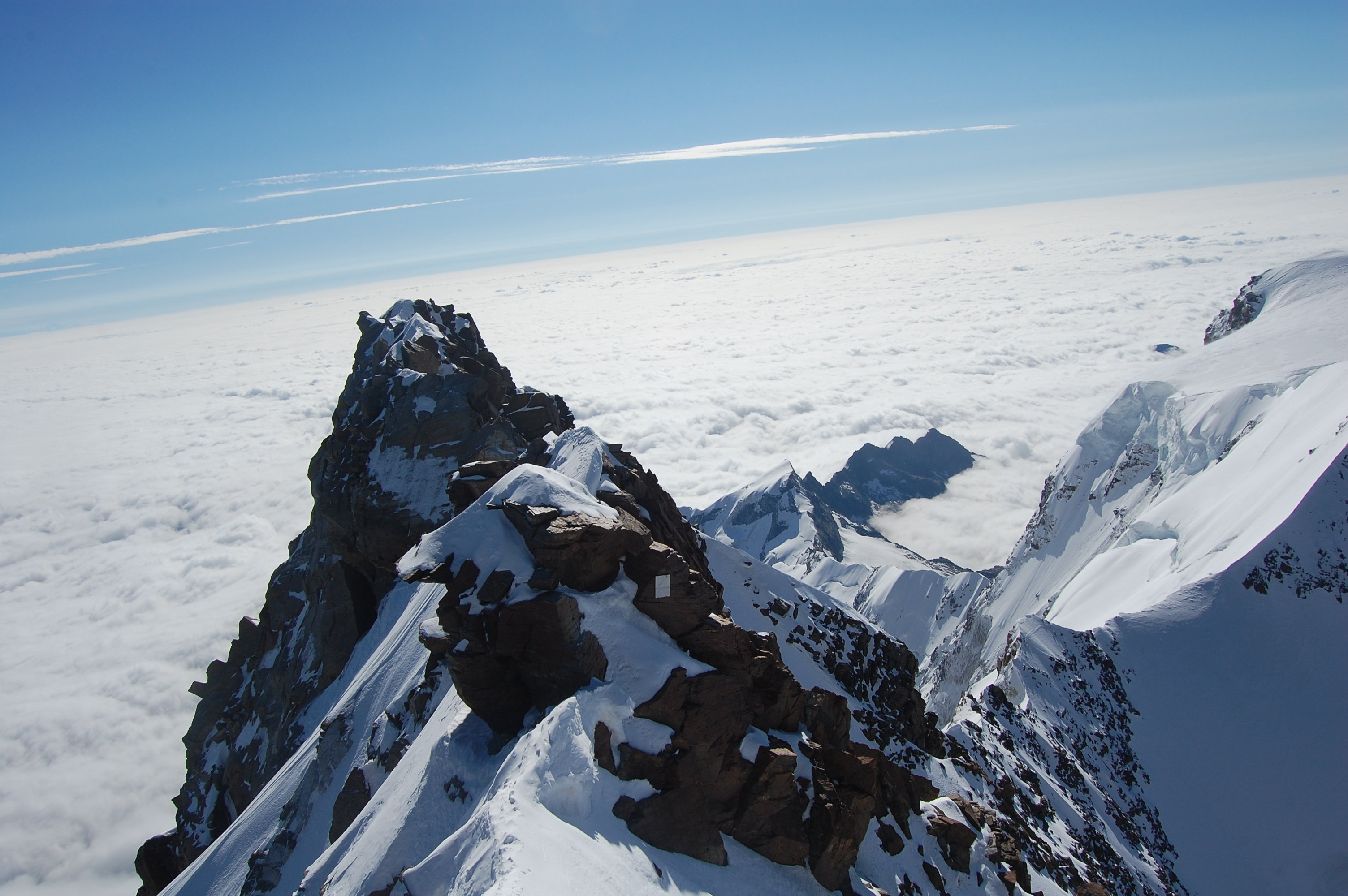
- From the peak to the southeast towards Italy, the Dunantspitze in the rear hides the 18-metre lower Grenzgipfel (English: Border Summit)

Highest point
- Elevation: 4,634 m (15,203 ft)
- Prominence: 2,165 m (7,103 ft) ↓ Great St Bernard Pass; Ranked 7th in the Alps
- Parent peak: Mount Blanc (line parent)
- Isolation: 78.1 km (48.5 mi) to Mont Blanc de Courmayeur → M Blanc de Courmayeur
- Listing: Country high point Canton high point Ultra; Seven Second Summits
- Coordinates: 45°56′12.6″N 7°52′01.4″E

Naming
- Native name: Dufourspitze; Höchste Spitze; Gornerhorn (German); Dufourspitze; Gornerhorn (Walser)
- English translation: Peak Dufour, Highest Peak, Large Horn

Geography
- Location within Switzerland Location within Canton of Valais Location within Alps
- Country: Switzerland
- Canton: Valais
- Parent range: Pennine Alps
- Topo map: Swisstopo 1348 Zermatt

Climbing
- First ascent: 1 August 1855 by Matthäus and Johannes Zumtaugwald, Ulrich Lauener, Christopher and James Smyth, Charles Hudson, John Birkbeck and Edward Stephenson.
- Easiest route: rock/snow/ice climb

The Dufourspitze (Note: German: Dufourspitze, Höchste Spitze or Gornerhorn; Walser: Dufourspitze or Gornerhorn; French: Pointe Dufour; Italian: Punta Dufour; Romansh: Piz da Dufour; Lombard: Ponta Dufour; Piedmontese: Ponta Dufour.) is the highest peak of Monte Rosa, an ice-covered mountain massif in the Alps. Dufourspitze is the highest mountain of both Switzerland and the Pennine Alps and is also the second-highest mountain of the Alps and Western Europe, after Mont Blanc. It is located between Switzerland (Canton of Valais) and Italy (Piedmont and Aosta Valley). The peak itself is located wholly in Switzerland.

Following a long series of attempts beginning in the early nineteenth century, Monte Rosa's summit, then still called Höchste Spitze (English: Highest Peak), was first reached on 1 August, the Swiss National celebration day, in 1855 from Zermatt by a party of eight climbers led by three guides: Matthäus and Johannes Zumtaugwald, Ulrich Lauener, Christopher and James Smyth, Charles Hudson, John Birkbeck and Edward Stephenson.

== Naming ==
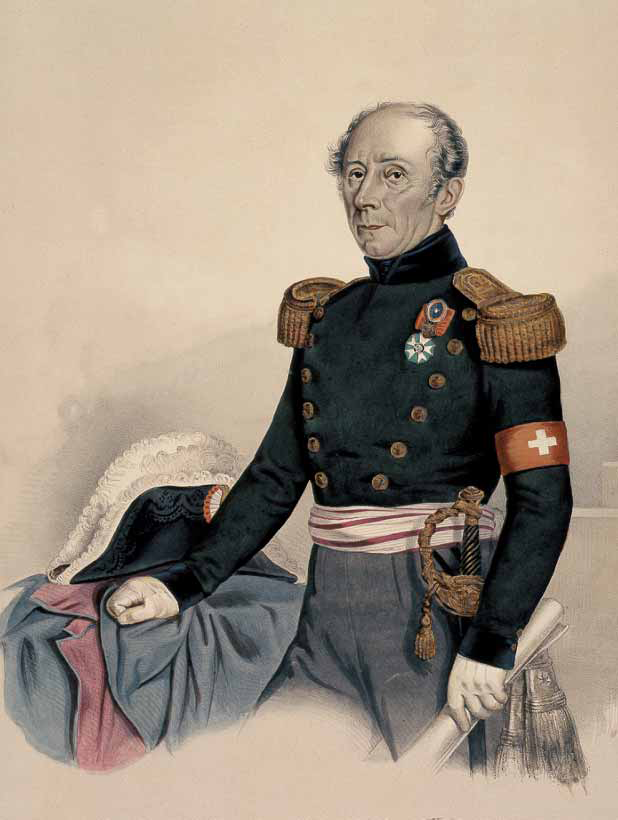
Guillaume-Henri Dufour

The peak is distinguished by the name Dufourspitze (in German, lit. 'Dufour Peak'; French: Pointe Dufour; Italian: Punta Dufour). This replaced the former name Höchste Spitze (English: Highest Peak) that was indicated on the Swiss maps before the Federal Council, on 28 January 1863, decided to rename the mountain in honor of Guillaume-Henri Dufour. Dufour was a Swiss engineer, topographer, co-founder of the Red Cross and army general who led the Sonderbund campaign. This decision followed the completion of the Dufour Map, a series of military topographical maps created under the command of Dufour.

The point just 80 m (260 ft) east of the Dufourspitze and only 2 metres lower, the Dunantspitze, was renamed in 2014 in honor of Henry Dunant, the main founder of the Red Cross.

== Elevation ==
The Dufourspitze of Monte Rosa is the most elevated point of Valais and Switzerland, although it is not the most prominent of the country, that distinction belonging to the Finsteraarhorn, nor the most isolated, that distinction belonging to Piz Bernina. The Swiss national map gives an elevation of 4,634.0 metres (15,203.4 ft) for the summit, which is 4,441 metres above Lake Maggiore, Switzerland's lowest point. The height difference between the summit and the plains of northern Italy, from where Monte Rosa is well visible, reaches over 4,500 metres (15,000 ft). Monte Rosa has a topographic prominence of 2,165 m (7,103 ft), the Great St Bernard Pass being the lowest col between it and the culminating point of the Alps. A 2000 survey, involving universities and the offices of cartography of Italy and Switzerland and part of the TOWER project (Top of the World Elevations Remeasurement), was made in order to record a more precise elevation for Monte Rosa. The result was 4,635.25 metres (15,207.5 ft) from the Italian side and 4,634.97 metres (15,206.6 ft) from the Swiss side, with a margin of error of 0.1 m. Monte Rosa succeeded the Finsteraarhorn as the highest summit of Switzerland in 1815, when Valais joined the Swiss Confederation.

Height measurements by year
1796 (Saussure's Travels in the Alps)	1862 (Dufour Map)	1941 (Siegfried Map)	1977 (National Map)	2000 (TOWER)	2009 (N. M.)
4,736 m (2430 T)	4,638 m	4,634.0 m	4,633.9 m	4,634.97 m	4,634.0 m

Though the Mediterranean can hardly be visible from the summit of Monte Rosa because of intervening mountains, the view to the south extends to the Apennines, the mountains of Corsica and the Maritime Alps. On the north side the view extends to the Jura and further to the Vosges, the Swiss Plateau being mostly hidden by the high range of the Bernese Alps.

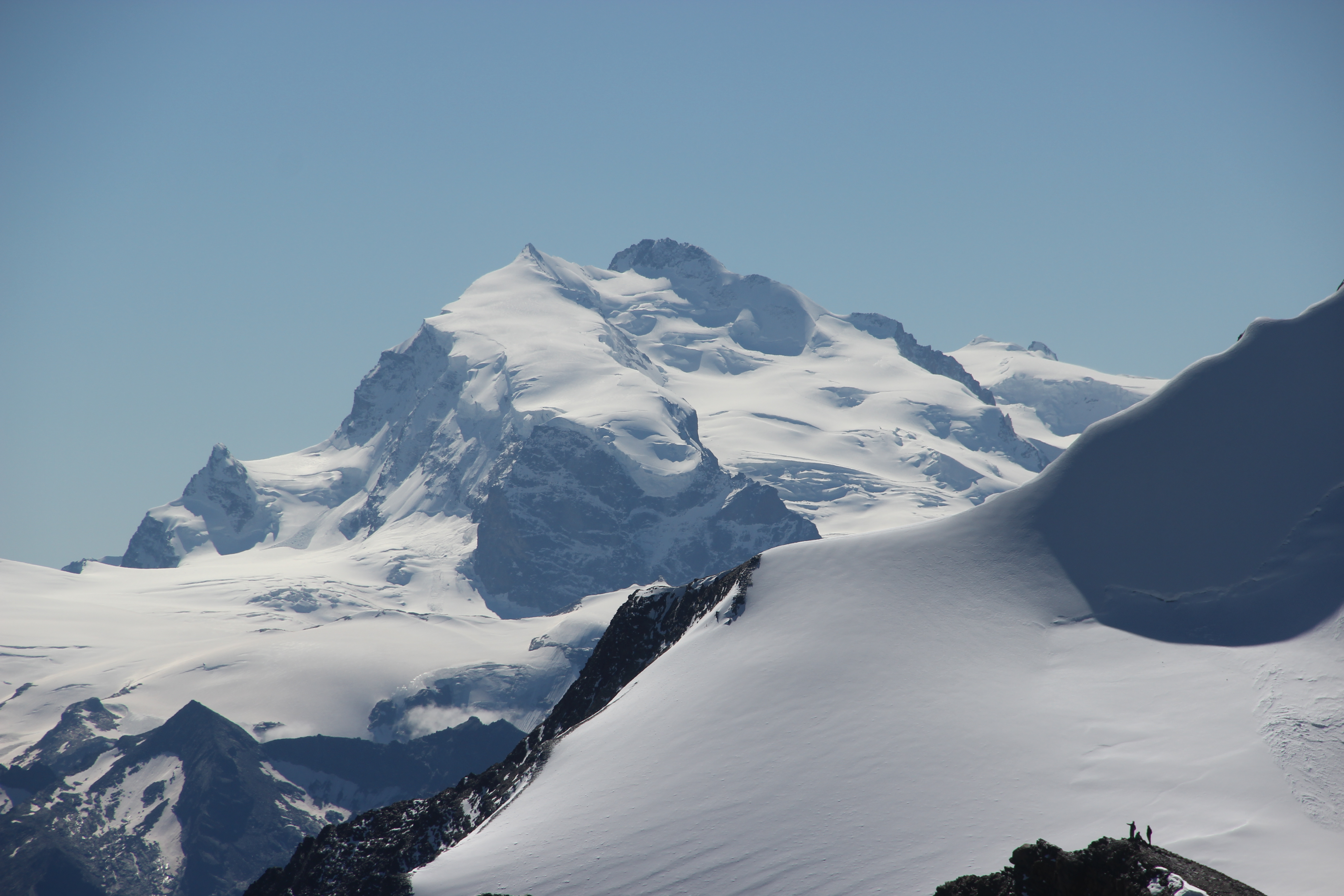
Nordend and Dufourspitze

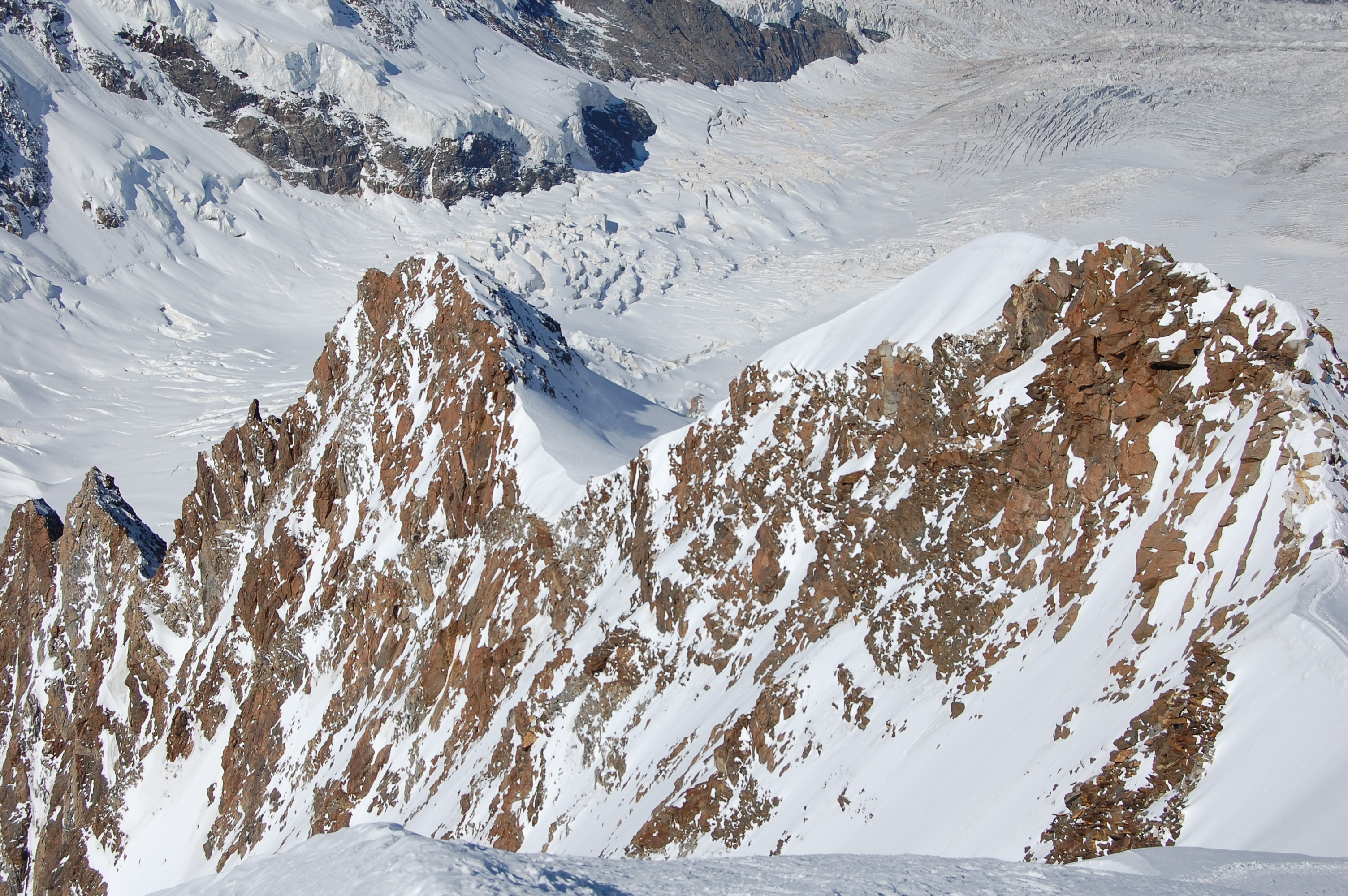
View from Dufourspitze towards the Grenzgletscher

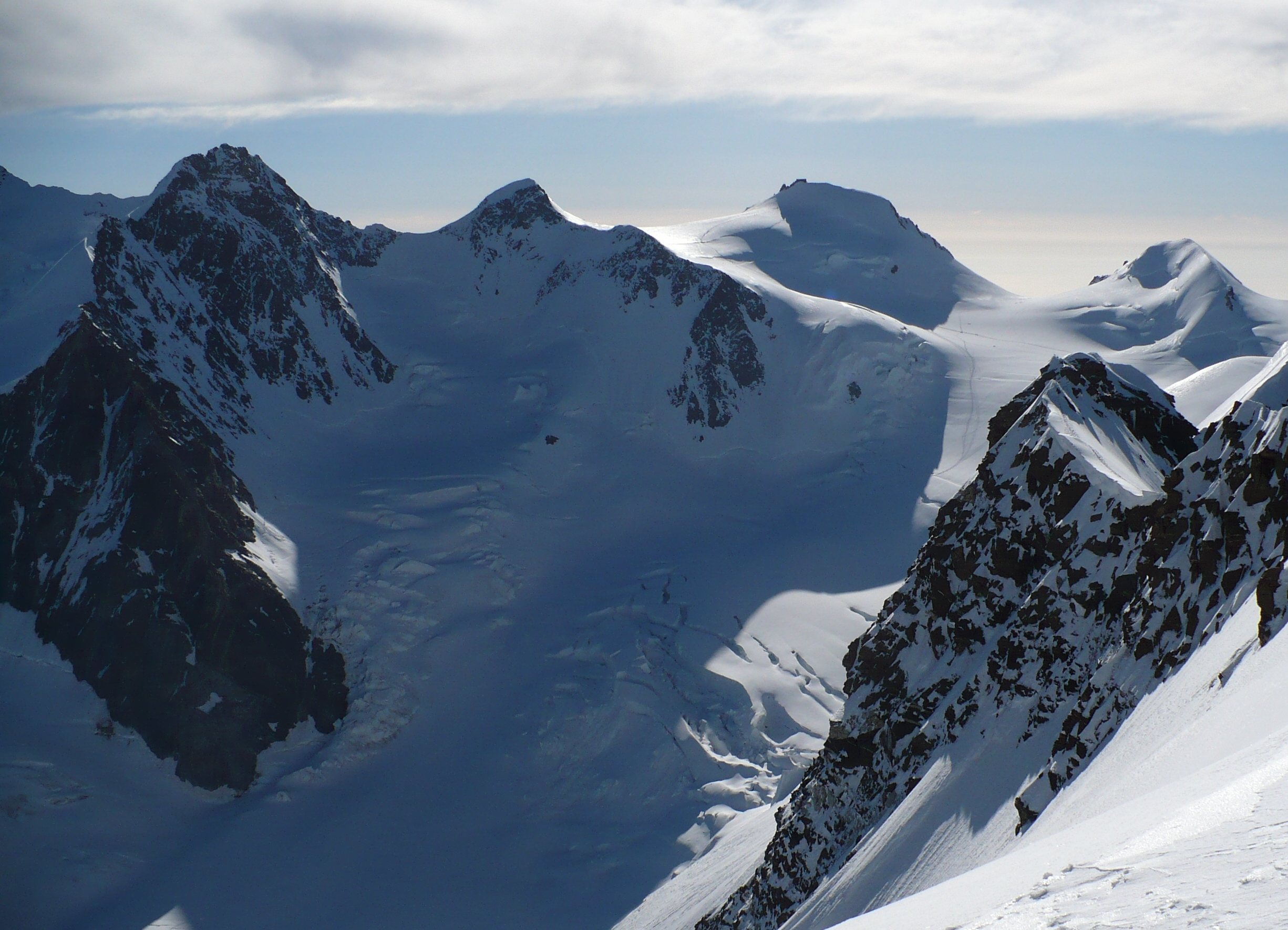
Monte Rosa from Liskamm: Dufourspitze (left), Zumsteinspitze, Signalkuppe and Parrotspitze (right)

== History ==
=== Early exploration ===
Monte Rosa could be seen from many places on the south side of the Alps and it had been mentioned in many travel diaries. At the end of the 15th century some outlines of the mountain may possibly have been painted by Leonardo da Vinci into the background of the Madonna of the Rocks or other pictures. Da Vinci explored the Italian side of the mountain and made some observations, though there is but scanty evidence that he had climbed even a minor summit in the neighbourhood. He was intrigued by the permanent snow lying on the mountain and the darkness of the sky above him, he wrote:

"The base of this mountain gives birth to the 4 rivers which flow in four different directions through the whole of Europe. And no mountain has its base at so great a height as this, which lifts itself above almost all the clouds; and snow seldom falls there, but only hail in the summer, when the clouds are highest. And this hail lies [unmelted] there, so that if it were not for the absorption of the rising and falling clouds, which does not happen more than twice in an age, an enormous mass of ice would be piled up there by the layers of hail, and in the middle of July I found it very considerable; and I saw the sky above me quite dark, and the sun as it fell on the mountain was far brighter here than in the plains below, because a smaller extent of atmosphere lay between the summit of the mountain and the sun."

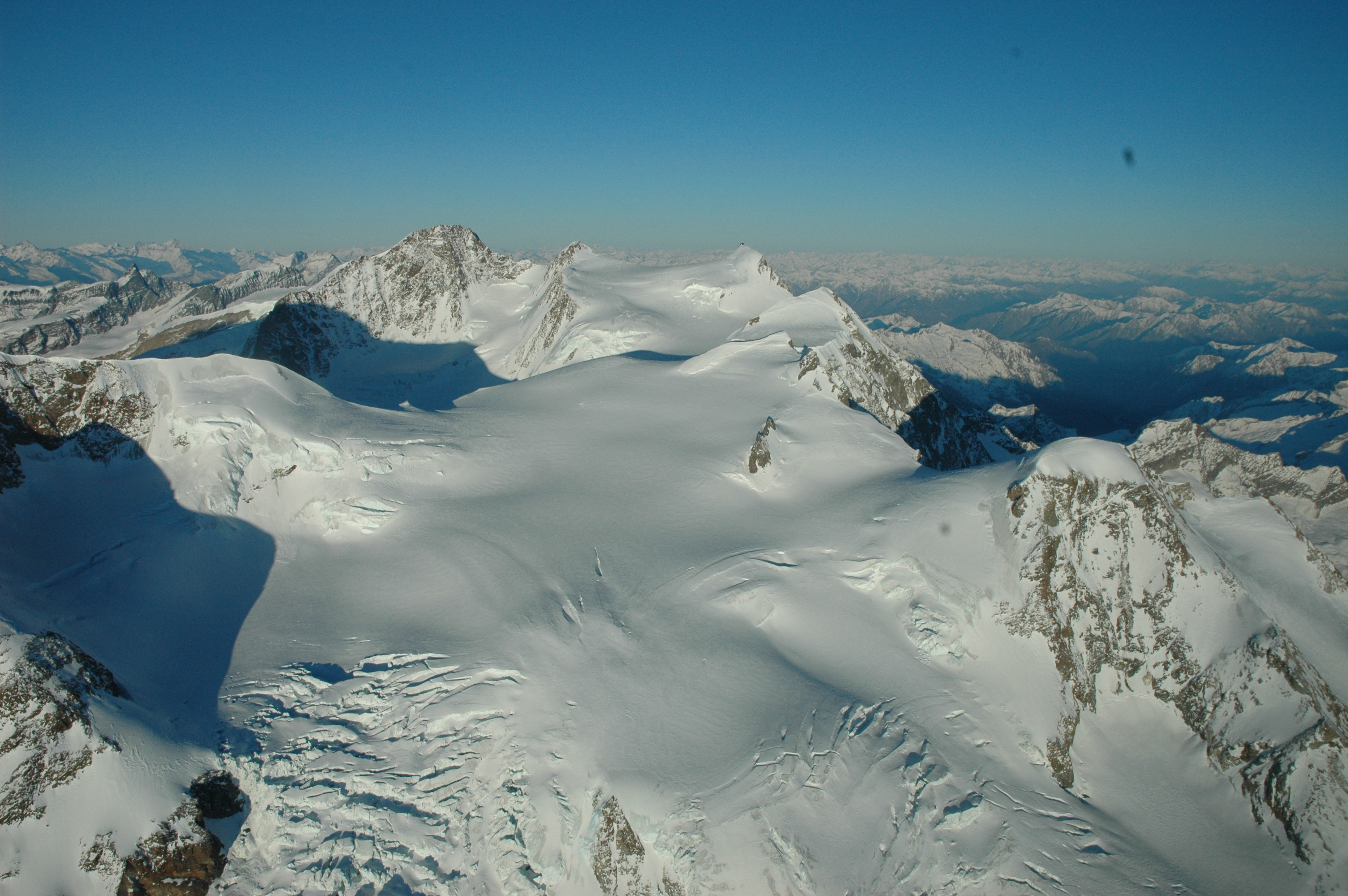
Aerial view of the Lysjoch area from the south

At the end of the eighteenth century, the people of the Italian valleys believed that a lost valley existed, hidden away between the glaciers of the great chain. The discovery of the valley was due to Joseph Beck of Gressoney-Saint-Jean. He put together a party, including his brother Valentin, and the Gressoney mountain guides Sebastian Linty, Joseph Zumstein, Nicolas (Niklaus) Vincent, François Castel and Étienne Lisco. They set out on a Sunday of August 1778. They started from their sleeping places at midnight, and roped carefully. They had furnished themselves with climbing irons and alpenstocks. At the head of the glacier, they encountered a slope of rock devoid of snow, which they climbed.

"It was twelve o'clock. Hardly had we got to the summit of the rock than we saw a grand-an amazing-spectacle. We sat down to contemplate at our leisure the lost valley, which seemed to us to be entirely covered with glaciers. We examined it carefully, but could not satisfy ourselves that it was the unknown valley, seeing that none of us had ever been in the Vallais."

The valley, in fact, was none other than the upper valley of Zermatt, and the pass, which these early explorers had reached, was the Lysjoch, where, to this day, the rock on which they rested bears the name that they gave it, the "Entdeckungsfels" (German: Rock of Discovery). Beck's party thus reached a height of 4,178 metres (13,707 ft), probably a record in the Alps at that times.

Count Morozzo of Turin was inspired by the view of Monte Rosa and in 1787 he tried to reach its summit from the east face. However he did not go very high, and the mountain looked much too inaccessible to encourage him to proceed further. He reached the place of the actual Marinelli hut, 1,500 m below the summit. The route on the east face was opened only in 1872. In 1789, following the recommendation of the Count, Horace-Bénédict de Saussure went to Macugnaga to explore the mountain. He climbed Pizzo Bianco, a 3215 m summit facing the mountain from the east and measured the altitude of Monte Rosa. He found a height of 2430 toises.

A first serious attempt was made in 1801 by a doctor of Alagna, Pietro Giordani. He reached alone a great height when climbing a 4,046 metres high point on the south-east ridge of the Vincent Pyramid, later named Giordanispétz or Punta Giordani in his honour. He arrived too late to proceed to the Vincent Pyramid summit and night drove him away. He had to sleep in a cleft of ice at about 14,000 feet. He wrote an account of his exploit: After an eloquent description of the view, he expresses his annoyance at the lack of scientific instruments, and the lateness of the hour which prevented him from ascending "Monte Rosa" itself.

The 4215 m Vincent Pyramid summit was eventually successfully climbed on 15 August 1819 by Johann Niklaus and Joseph Vincent from Gressoney, after whom the peak has been named. The brothers Vincent tried to reach the highest summit again the next year, together with Joseph Zumstein, and guides and porters. On 1 August 1820 they reached a 4,563 metres high secondary summit, later named Zumsteinspitze. The climb was dangerous, as the party had to traverse under threatening walls of ice; they also had great difficulties on descent, because the afternoon sun had melted the snow on the slopes. They used mules to carry their equipment as far as the snow-line. During the expedition they thought they had climbed the true highest peak, but when they reached the summit they found out it was only a subpeak of Monte Rosa. Zumstein was anxious to return later and reach the highest summit, but his desire did not materialize.

=== First ascents ===
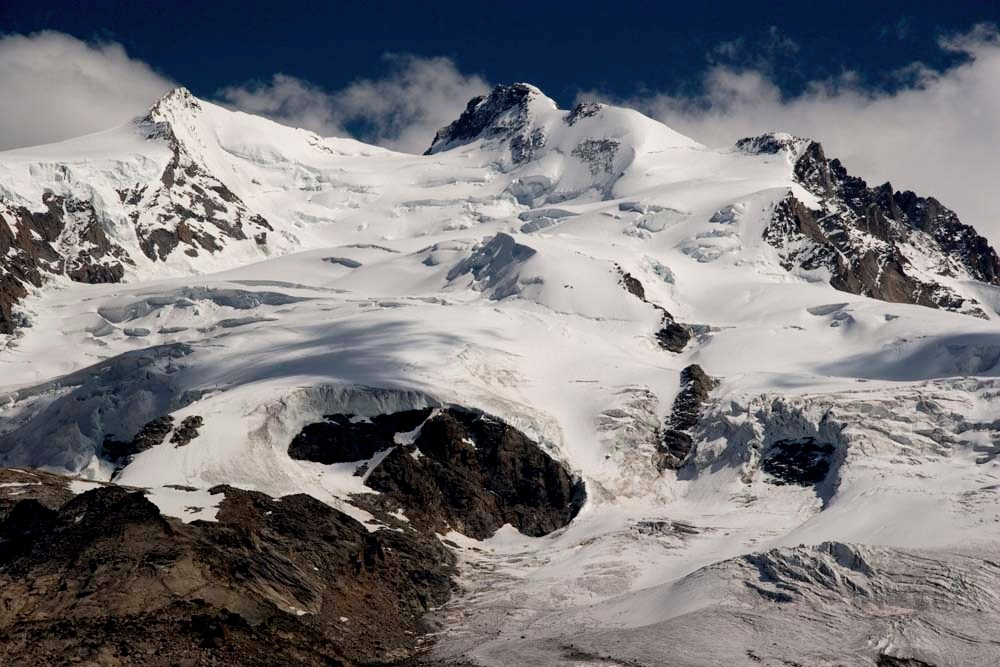
The west flank and the Monte Rosa Glacier. The Nordend (left) is separated from the summit by the Silbersattel.

The first approaches to the summit were made from the northern slopes over the Gorner glacier via the Silbersattel (4,510 m). This pass was first reached on 12 August 1847 by Matthias and Johann zum Taugwald (guides from Zermatt whose name is also written "Zumtaugwald"), Johann Brantschen and Joseph Moser guiding the French professors Victor Puisieux and Edouard Ordinaire. Precisely a year later (12 August 1848), Johann Madutz from Matt, Glarus, and Matthias Zumtaugwald guided the Swiss theologian Melchior Ulrich to the pass for an ascent of the highest summit. Ulrich had to give up, but the guides proceeded to climb to what they thought to be the Eastern summit of the Dufourspitze (Ostspitze, since 2014 Dunantspitze, 4632 m) and established a new altitude record in Switzerland. The descent over the same route was so tricky that Madutz at places had to lower down Zum Taugwald by rope. Three years later, on 22 August 1851, Johann Zumtaugwald returned, with Peter Taugwalder and Peter Inderbinen and the Swiss botanist brothers Adolf and Hermann Schlagintweit to repeat this ascent. They did not dare to traverse to the western summit, which the Schlagintweits estimated to be 7 meters higher. In 1891, W. A. B. Coolidge analyzed these ascents and concluded that both parties had reached the 4,618 m Grenzgipfel instead, which is a mere 50 meters to the east of Ostspitze. He transferred the honor of first climbing the Ostgipfel to Ulrich Lauener from Lauterbrunnen and the brothers Christopher, Edmund and James G. Smyth from Great Yarmouth, who reached the Ostspitze on 1 September 1854 from the Silbersattel. Some sources have the Zumtaugwald brothers also among this party. Zumtaugwald brothers returned twice more to the East summit, Johann and Matthias 10 days later (11 Sep 1854) with Edward Shirley Kennedy and Benedict Leir, and Matthias and Stephan later again with Edward Levi Ames. On these five occasions they never tried the difficult traverse to the western summit, also because the summits were both mapped as 4,638 m high at the time. Partially with the technical difficulty (UIAA III) of the route from Silbersattel in mind, many consider the Madutz and Zumtaugwald ascent in 1849 the true first ascent of Monta Rosa.

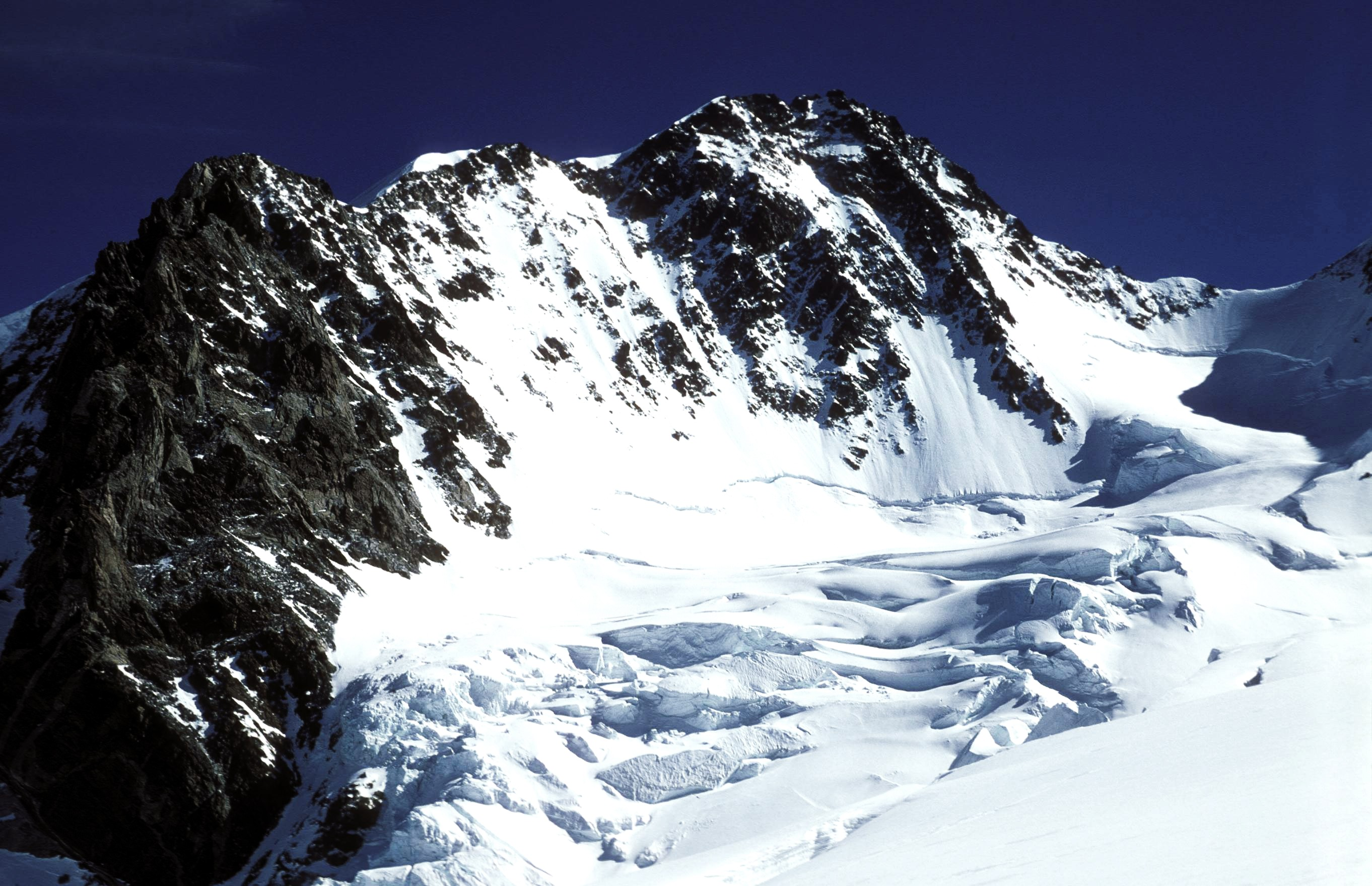
The Dufourspitze from the south

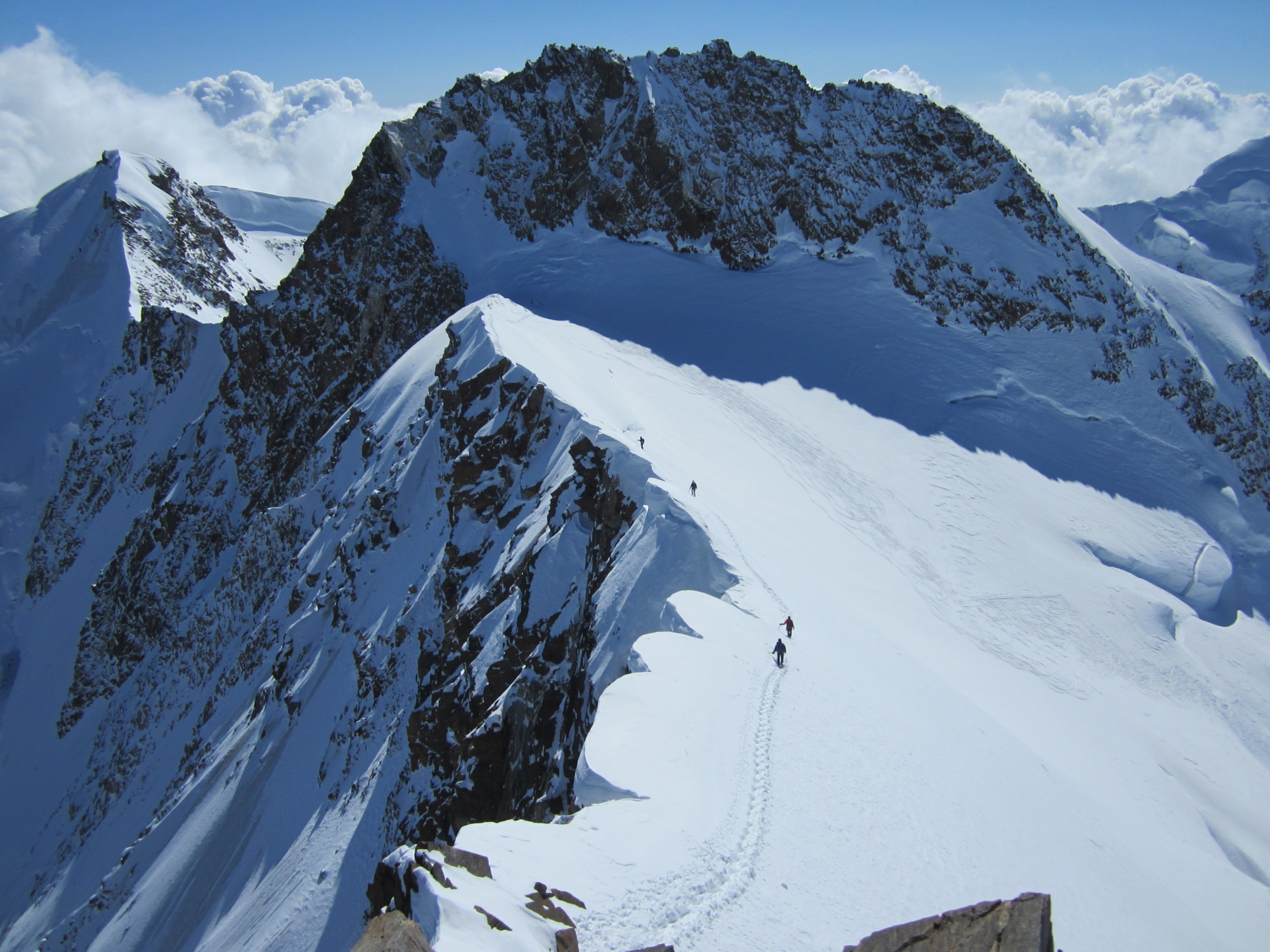
Dufourspitze, Dunantspitze, and Grenzgipfel from Nordend

The first ascent of the western summit finally took place on 1 August 1855 by the above guides Matthias and Johann zum Taugwald and Ulrich Lauener and two of the Smyth brothers (James Greenville and Christopher). They were joined by the English gentlemen John Birkbeck, Charles Hudson and Edward Stephenson. Deeming the approach from the east summit unfeasible, the guides devised a route over the junction of the Monte Rosa and Grenz glaciers and over the west ridge directly to the west summit. Not two weeks later, on 13 August 1855, Johann and his brother Peter zum Taugwald guided eight more people, including Johann Jakob Weilenmann, to the summit over the same route. The west ridge route immediately became very popular and is still the normal route to the Dufourspitze.

The Irish physicist John Tyndall was guided to the summit in a group led by Ulrich Lauener in August 1858, but returned the next day (or week?) to make the first solo ascent of Dufourspitze on 17 August 1858, which he described in his account, Glaciers of the Alps.

"After breakfast I poured what remained of my tea into a small glass bottle, an ordinary demi-bouteille in fact; the waiter then provided me with a ham sandwich, and, with my scrip thus frugally furnished, I thought the heights of Monte Rosa might be won..."

After encountering a party of climbers guided by Lauener, Tyndall reached alone the summit:

"A world of clouds and mountains lay beneath me. Switzerland, with its pomp of summits, was clear and grand; Italy was also grand, but more than half obscured. Dark cumulus and dark crag vied in savagery, while at other places white snows and white clouds held equal rivalry. The scooped valleys of Monte Rosa itself were magnificent, all gleaming in the bright sunlight — tossed and torn at intervals, and sending from their rents and walls the magical blue of the ice."

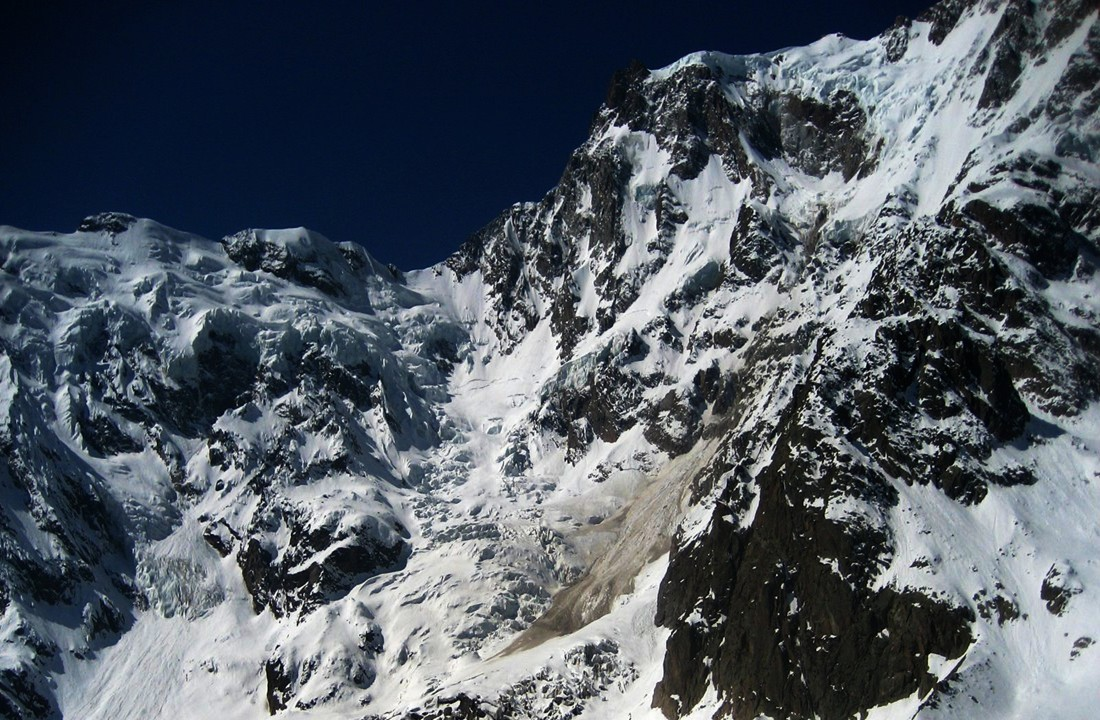
View from the base of the east face

Among mountain guides, the eastern wall had the reputation of being unconquerable. Ferdinand Imseng was convinced that the long snow couloir in the middle of the face could be ascended. He succeeded in convincing other climbers and, on 22 July 1872, Richard Pendlebury, William and Charles Taylor, Ferdinand Imseng, Gabriel Spechtenhauser and Giovanni Oberto began the ascent from Macugnaga. They were aware of the objective dangers of the wall but they decided to go as high as possible, without compromising their lives. After a bivouac on the actual Marinelli hut emplacement, they headed towards the Grenzsattel. Suddenly, when they arrived near the Grenzsattel, an avalanche started and rivers of snow began to flow everywhere around the climbers. They were able to reach the safe rocks of the Grenzgipfel just in time to save their lives. They finally reached the summit and descended to Riffelalp on the other side, concluding an 18-hour journey.

This ascent made Ferdinand Imseng a famous mountain guide. He lost his life in 1881 on the east wall during the third ascent with Damiano Marinelli and guide Battista Pedranzini. On 8 August, they were caught by an avalanche and brought 1,200 metres down. The accident was reported by a porter who survived. The couloir was then named Canalone Marinelli.

=== Other ascents ===
In 1889 Achille Ratti, who became later Pope Pius XI, made the first traverse from Macugnaga to Zermatt by the Zumsteinjoch. After climbing the Dufourspitze, he spent the night on the summit with his companions.

Visiting Zermatt in 1894, the young Winston Churchill insisted on an ascent of Monte Rosa rather than of the Matterhorn, not only because of its superior height but also because the guides' fee was substantially less.

More recently, on 1 August (which happens to be the Swiss National Day), 2005, the Swiss Minister of Treasure Joseph Deiss climbed the Dufourspitze. The expedition marked the 150th anniversary of the first ascent.

== Huts and climbing routes ==
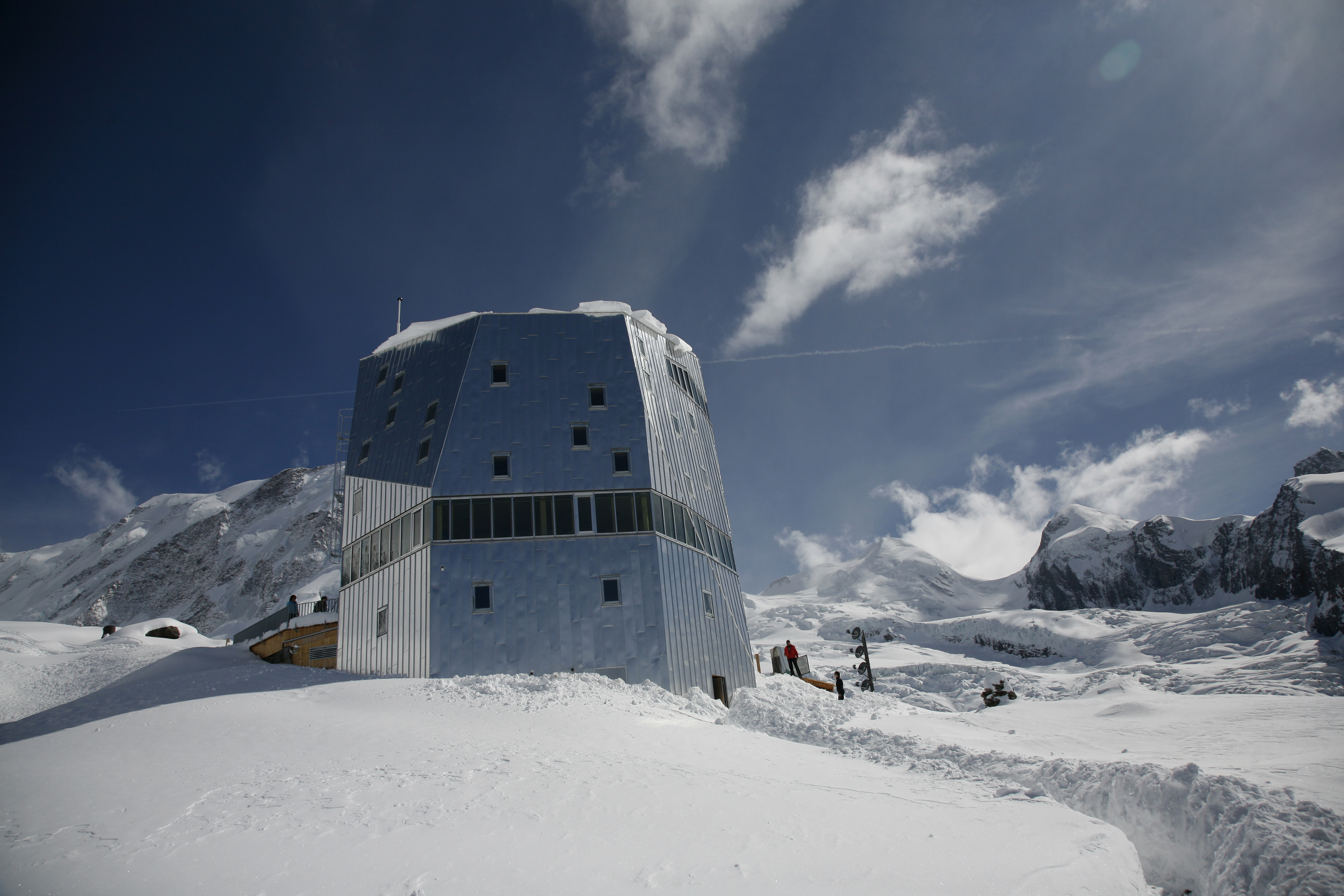
The Monte Rosa Hut in May in front of the Lyskamm

The Monte Rosa Hut (2,883 m) is the only mountain hut in the massif owned by the Swiss Alpine Club. It is situated on the Plattje, a rocky island between the Gorner and Grenz glaciers. It is accessible from Rotenboden, a station on the Gornergratbahn line. The hut was inaugurated in 1894 and rebuilt in 1940. In 2009, a new high technology mountain hut was inaugurated. The five-story crystal-shaped building is designed to obtain 90 per cent of its power needs from the sun and will be used as a research station.

The other huts are owned by the Italian Alpine Club, among them the Regina Margherita Hut located at 4,559 metres on the Signalkuppe. Inaugurated in 1893 and replaced in 1979, it is still the highest construction in Europe, and includes a laboratory and observatory.

Other huts owned by the Italian Alpine Club are the Marinelli Hut (3,036 m), used for the ascent of the east face, and the Bivacco Città di Gallarate (3,960 m), located near the summit of the Jägerhorn.

=== Normal route ===
The normal route to the summit begins at the Monte Rosa Hut. The normal route is mainly a glacier itinerary on the west slopes of Monte Rosa (Monte Rosa Glacier), with the final rocky west ridge to the summit. Although the itinerary itself is not difficult, it requires physical endurance and good acclimatization.

=== Marinelli couloir ===
The route starts from the Marinelli Hut and follows the steep Marinelli couloir on the east face. It is a long and dangerous route and has to be ascended very early in the morning on cold days in order to decrease the risk of avalanches.

== Timeline ==
- First ascent in 1855 (normal route).
- First ascent on the eastern wall, via the Marinelli Couloir in 1872 (22 July) by Taylor, Pendlebury and Ferdinand Imseng (guide)
- First ascent via the southern spur (Cresta Rey) by Eustace Hulton with guides Joseph Moser and Peter Rubi on 20 August 1874.
- First ascent via the southeast ridge (today route from Margherita hut) by F. P. Barlow, G. W. Prothero with guides Antonio Carrel and Peter Taugwalder on 31 August 1874.
- First winter ascent via the southern spur (Cresta Rey) by Vittorio Sella with guides Daniel Maquignaz and Joseph Maquignaz on 26 January 1884.
- First winter ascent via the southeast ridge by Mario Piacenza, A. Curta, A. Lazier, O. Lazier on 18 January 1907.
- First solo ascent of the east face by Angelo Taveggia in 1924.
- First winter ascent of the east face in 1965 (5–6 February) by mountain guides Luciano Bettineschi, Felice Jacchini, Michele Pala and Lino Pironi.
- In June 1969, the extreme skier Sylvain Saudan descended the entire Marinelli Couloir on the east face.
- First solo winter ascent via the east face on 4 February 1991 by Walter Bernardi. Injured, he was rescued by helicopter on the descent near the Grenzsattel.

== Panorama ==
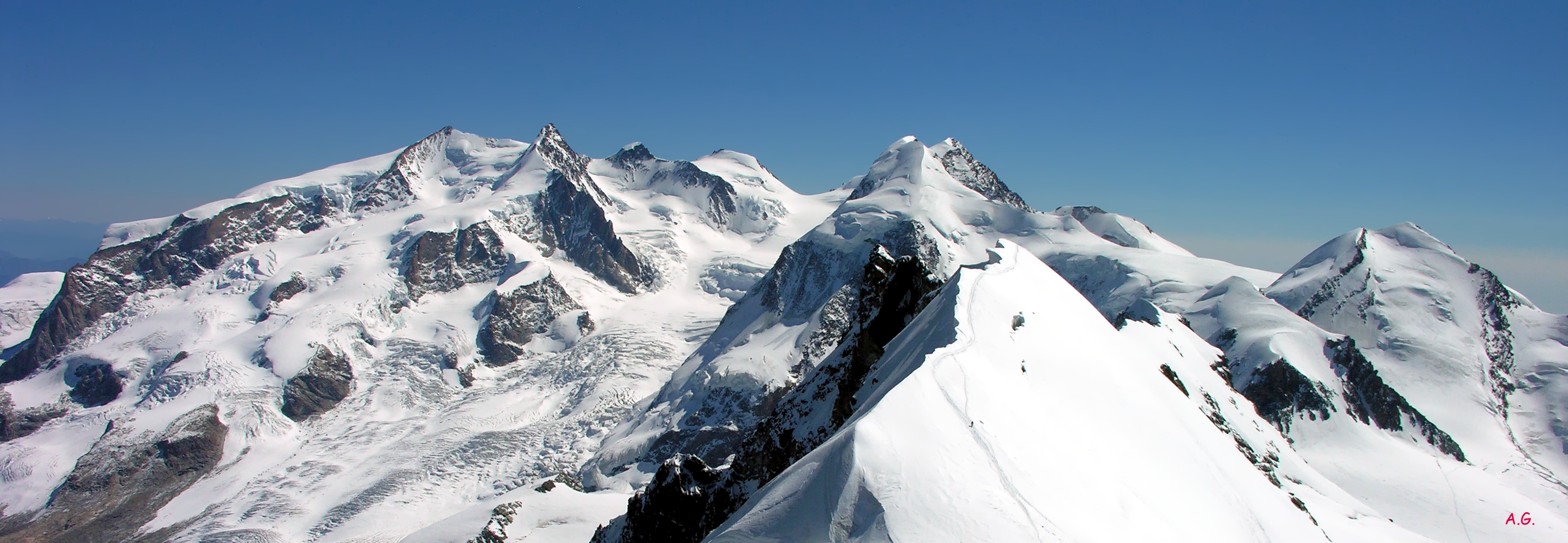
Monte Rosa massif, Grenzgletscher, and Liskamm (from Breithorn)

== See also ==
- List of Alpine four-thousanders
- List of mountains of Valais
- High Alps
