= Gnifetti Hut =

Italian mountain hut

Capanna Giovanni Gnifetti
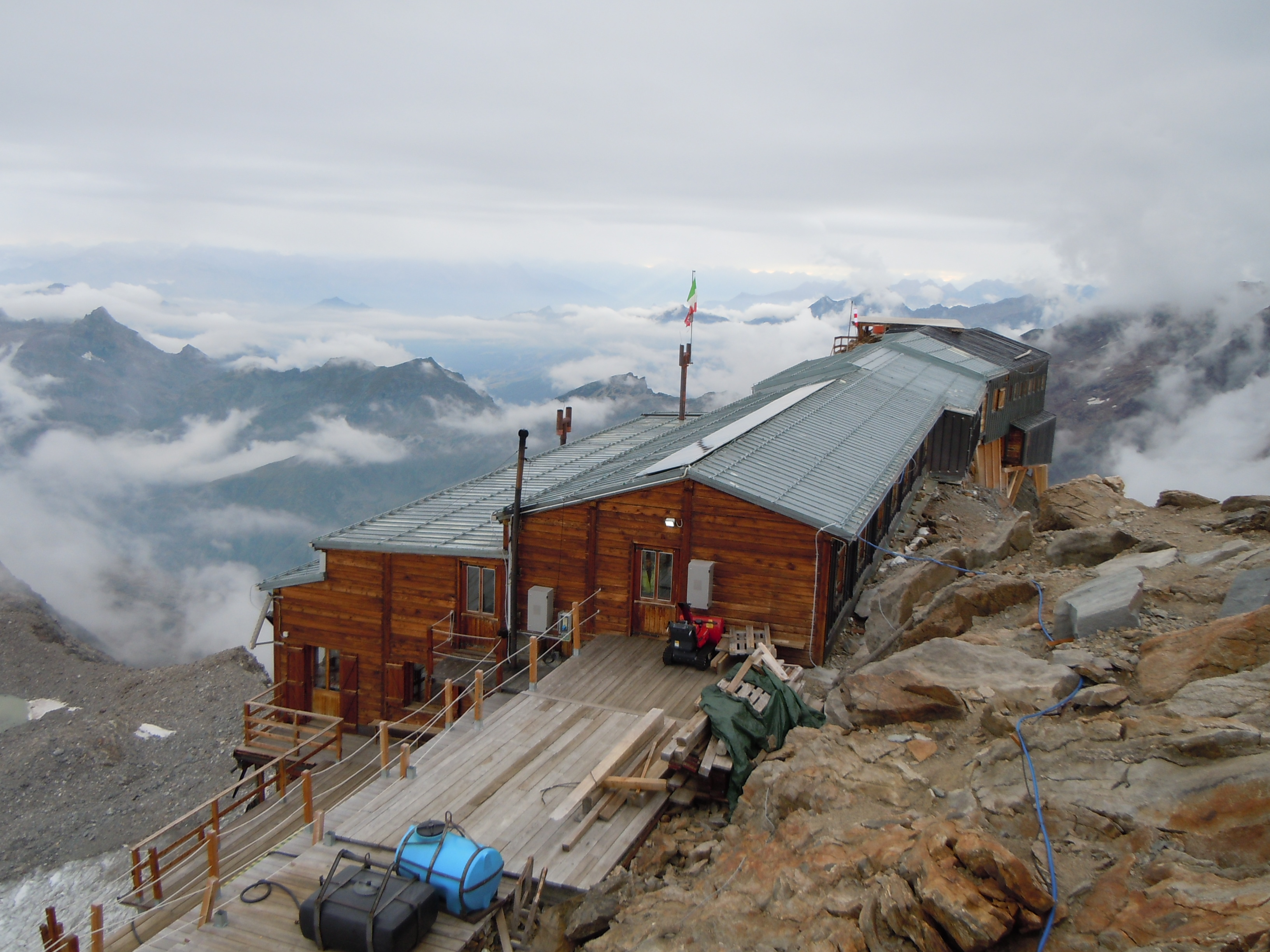
- Gnifetti Hut, 2012

- Location within Aosta Valley

General information
- Location: Garstelet Glacier
- Coordinates: 45°53′59″N 7°51′00″E
- Elevation: 3,647 m (11,965 ft)
- Year built: 1876
- Owner: Club Alpino Italiano

Website
- www.rifugimonterosa.it/en/web/gnifetti-hut-39

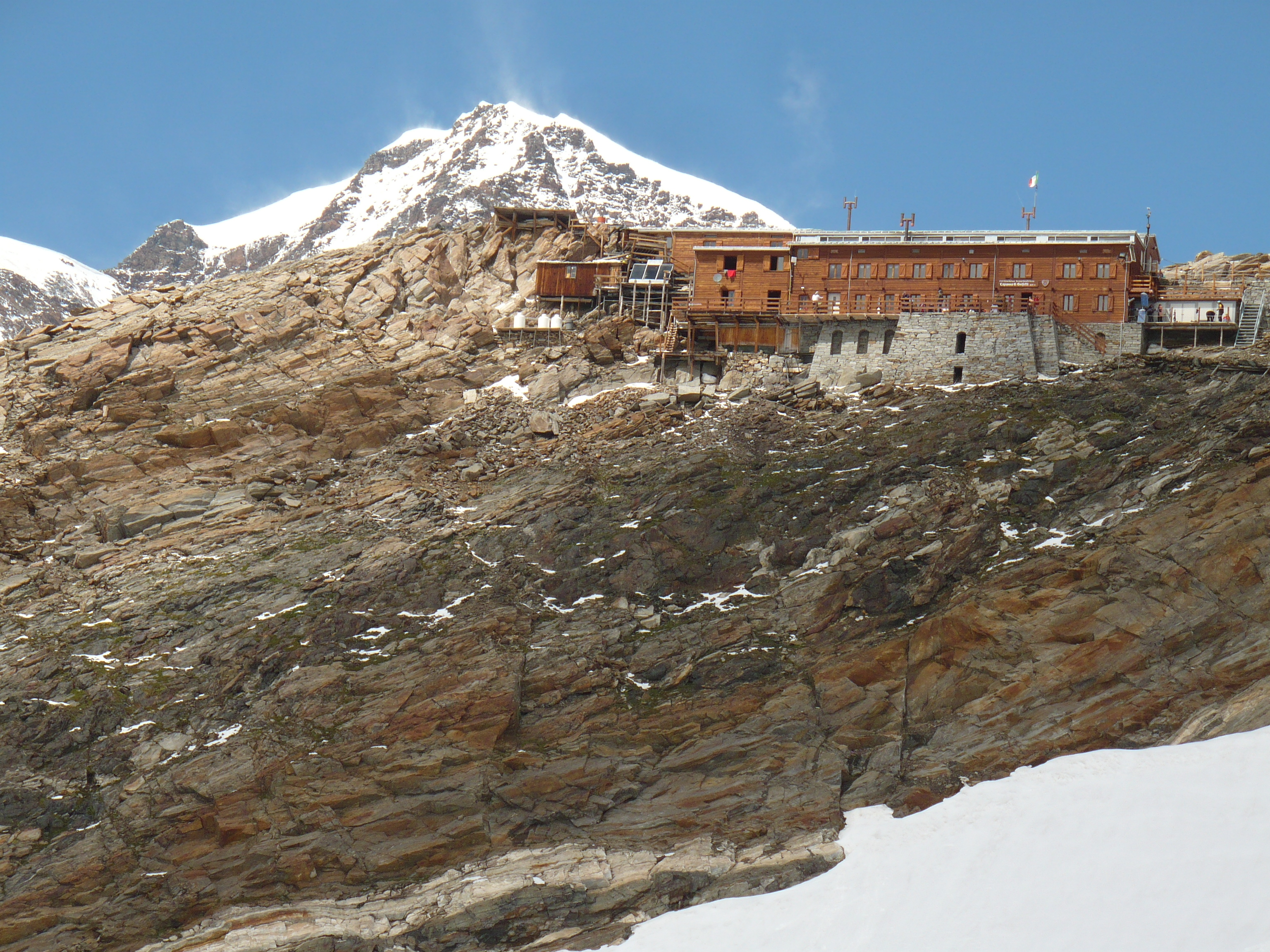
Gnifetti Hut with Liskamm behind

The Gnifetti Hut (Italian: Capanna Giovanni Gnifetti) is a refuge in the Pennine Alps in Aosta Valley, Italy. It is located at an altitude of 3,647 metres (11,965 ft), and provides access to mountaineers climbing any of the fifteen nearby 4,000 metre high summits of the Monte Rosa massif, and gives access to high-level glacier routes as well as to the Margherita Hut, located on the Signalkuppe.

The refuge is named after Italian mountaineer and parish priest from Alagna Valsesia, Giovanni Gnifetti.
