= Western Lyskamm =

Subsidiary peak of the Lyskamm

- Western Liskamm
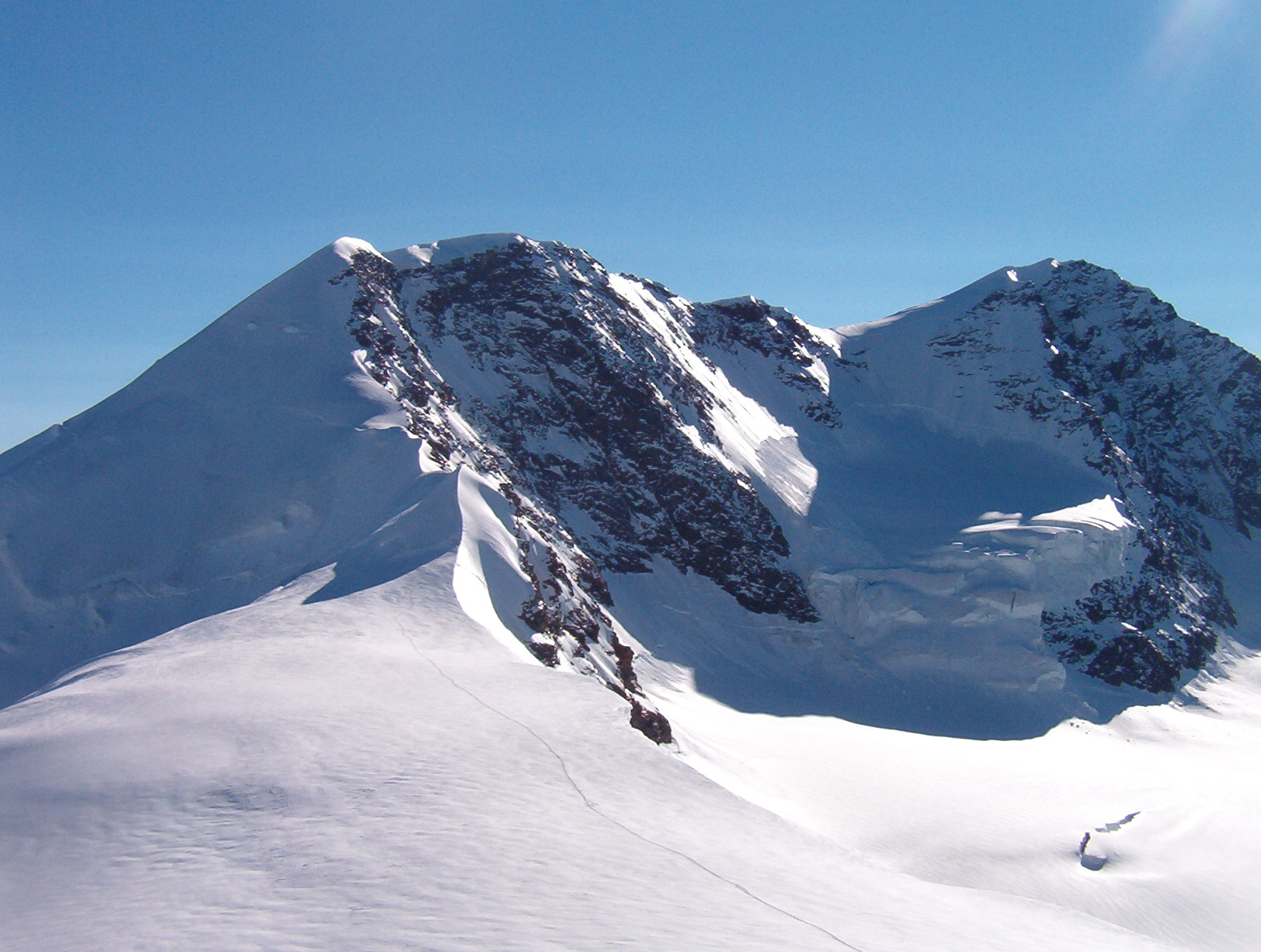
- Lyskamm's southern side

Highest point
- Elevation: 4,479 m (14,695 ft)
- Prominence: 62 m (203 ft)
- Parent peak: Lyskamm
- Isolation: 1.11 km (0.69 mi)
- Coordinates: 45°55′39″N 7°49′19″E

Geography
- Location within Alps
- Location: Switzerland – Italy
- Parent range: Pennine Alps
- Topo map: Swiss Federal Office of Topography swisstopo

The Western Lyskamm (German: Liskamm Westgipfel) is a subsidiary peak of the Lyskamm.
