= Entdeckungsfels =

Mountain in Switzerland

- Roccia della Scoperta; Rocher de la découverte
- Location within Switzerland

Highest point
- Elevation: 4,178 m (13,707 ft)
- Coordinates: 45°55′15.7″N 7°51′6.1″E

Geography
- Location: Valais, Switzerland
- Parent range: Pennine Alps

The Entdeckungsfels (Italian: Roccia della Scoperta, French: Rocher de la découverte) is a minor summit located in Switzerland, close to the Italian border. It is west of the Lysjoch, between Liskamm and Ludwigshöhe. Because of its small prominence, it was included in the enlarged list of alpine four-thousanders.
