= Lysjoch =

Mountain pass in the Alps between Italy and Switzerland

Coordinates: 45.9204°N 7.8512°E

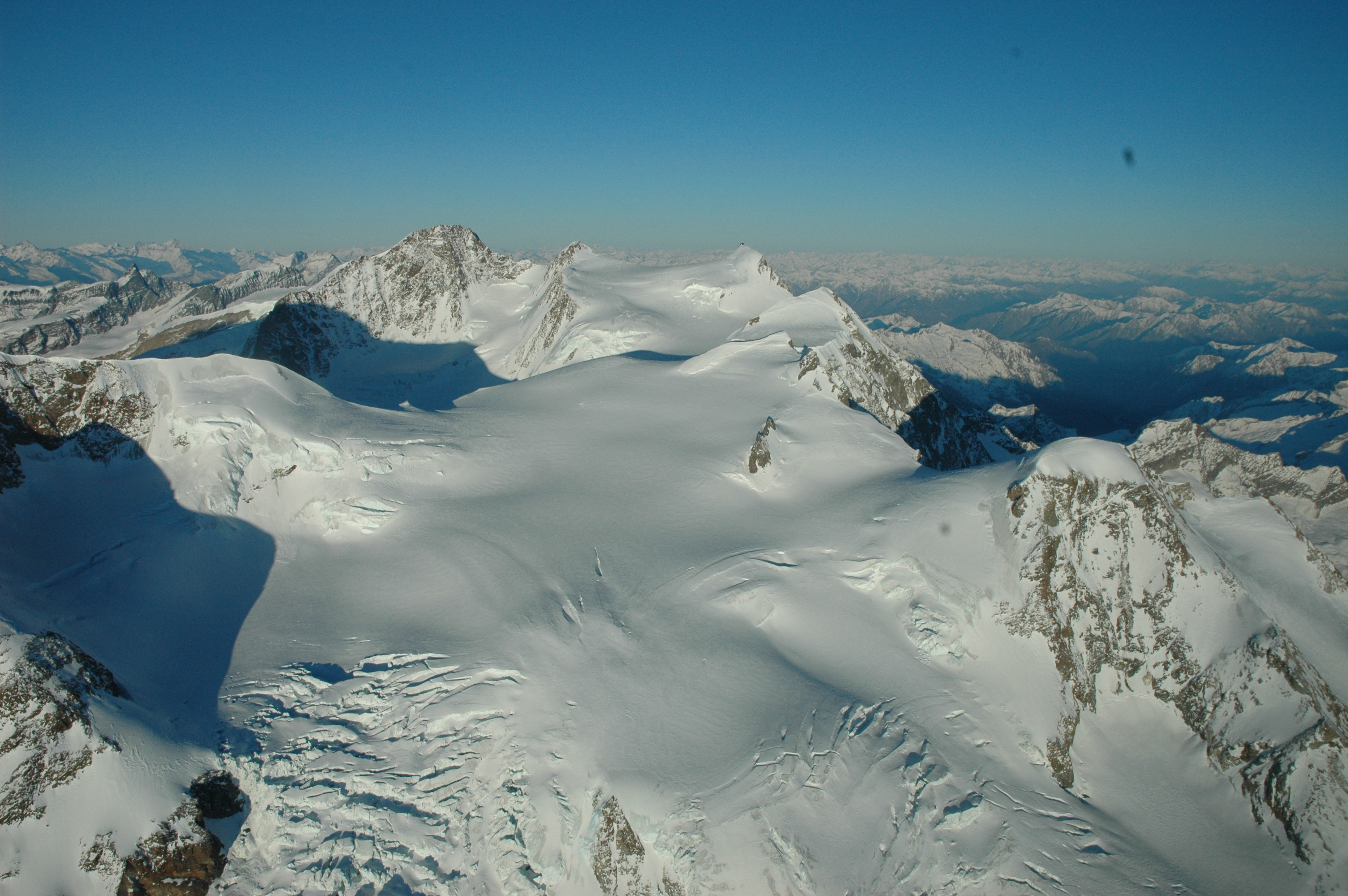
Aerial view of the Lysjoch (centre-left) and Monte Rosa (background)

The Lysjoch (or Lisjoch) (French: Col du Lys, Italian: Colle del Lys) is a very high pass at 4,151 metres (13,619 ft) in the Alps between Italy and Switzerland. It is located east of the Lyskamm and west of the Ludwigshöhe, a subsidiary summit of Monte Rosa, and makes up the watershed between the Gorner Glacier and the Lys Glacier. Just west of the pass is the Entdeckungsfels, a rock emerging from the ice. The pass connects the valleys of Zermatt on the north side to the valley of Gressoney on the south side.

The Lysjoch is the lowest point between Lyskamm and the slightly higher Monte Rosa, two of the highest independent mountains of the Pennine Alps, constituting the highest key col of any of the 300 metre-prominent mountains in the Alps. It is therefore the highest pass in the Alps considering only at least 300 metre-deep saddles.

== History ==
On August 29, 1974, after Julius Evola passed way, in accordance with his strict final instructions, the cremated remains of Evola were lowered into a glacial crevasse at the Lysjoch pass, facing the Lyskamm face. The expedition to bury him was carried out by a small group of his close associates and mountain guides.
