= John Birkbeck =

John Birkbeck (6 July 1817 – 31 July 1890) was a Yorkshireman, banker, alpinist, and pioneer potholer.

== Early life and career ==
Born in Settle and educated at the local Giggleswick School and Trinity College, Cambridge (although, as a Quaker, he could not take a degree) he spent most of his life in his home town where he was a partner in the Craven Bank, which his family had established in 1791. He was also a justice of the peace in later life. The family home was Anley (now a nursing home).

== Caving ==
His name is remembered for his involvement in some early explorations of some of the potholes of Ingleborough, especially Gaping Gill and Alum Pot, although the records are sparse.

Around 1842, Birkbeck had the water from Fell Beck diverted down 'the Birkbeck Trench' and went first 100 and then 190 feet down the Main Shaft of Gaping Gill, where there is a ledge which now bears his name, but then 'barred further descent'; no further attempts reached the bottom until Martel reached the Main Chamber, another 170 feet lower, in 1895.

In 1847, Birkbeck provided ropes to enable the first recorded descent of Alum Pot, made via Long Churn cave. The bottom was not reached on that occasion, but in the following year a direct descent was made of the main shaft, followed by further descents to where 'the water sank in a quiet rotary pool, so that further progress was impossible'. He was also there for the next descent, which was not until 1870 but is better known as it was described by William Boyd Dawkins in his book, Cave Hunting published in 1874.

== Mountaineering ==
He was a member of the party which made the first ascent of Monte Rosa in 1855 and, in 1857, a founder member of the Alpine Club, having been a friend of its first president, John Ball, at Cambridge.

== See also ==
- Caving in the United Kingdom
