= Lyskamm =

Mountain in the Pennine Alps

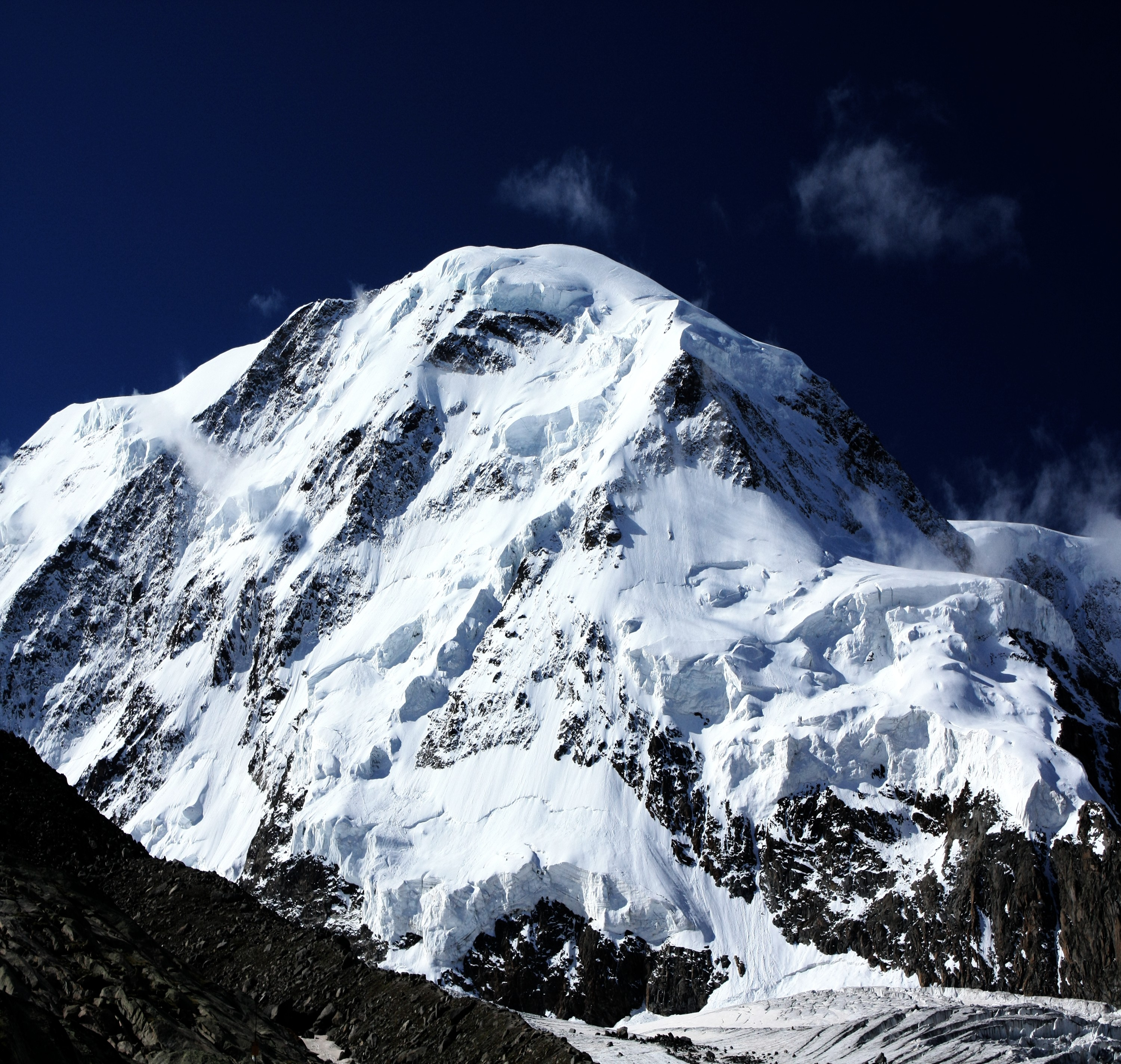
- North-east side of Lyskamm

Highest point
- Elevation: 4,532 m (14,869 ft)
- Prominence: 379 m ↓ Lisjoch
- Parent peak: Monte Rosa
- Isolation: 3 km (1.9 mi) → Zumsteinspitze
- Coordinates: 45°55′21″N 7°50′08″E

Naming
- Native name: Liskamm (German)
- English translation: Lys Ridge

Geography
- Location within Alps
- Countries: Italy and Switzerland
- Region/Canton: Aosta Valley and Valais
- Parent range: Pennine Alps
- Topo map: Swiss Federal Office of Topography swisstopo

Climbing
- First ascent: J. F. Hardy and party, 1861
- Easiest route: Basic glacier/snow climb/scrambling along exposed ridge

Lyskamm (German: Liskamm, formerly Lyskamm, literally "crest of the Lys"), also known as Silberbast (literally "silver bast"), is a mountain (4,532 m (14,869 ft)) in the Pennine Alps lying on the border between Switzerland and Italy. It consists of a five-kilometre-long ridge with two distinct peaks. The mountain has gained a reputation for seriousness because of the many cornices lying on the ridge and the frequent avalanches, thus leading to its nickname the Menschenfresser ("people eater").

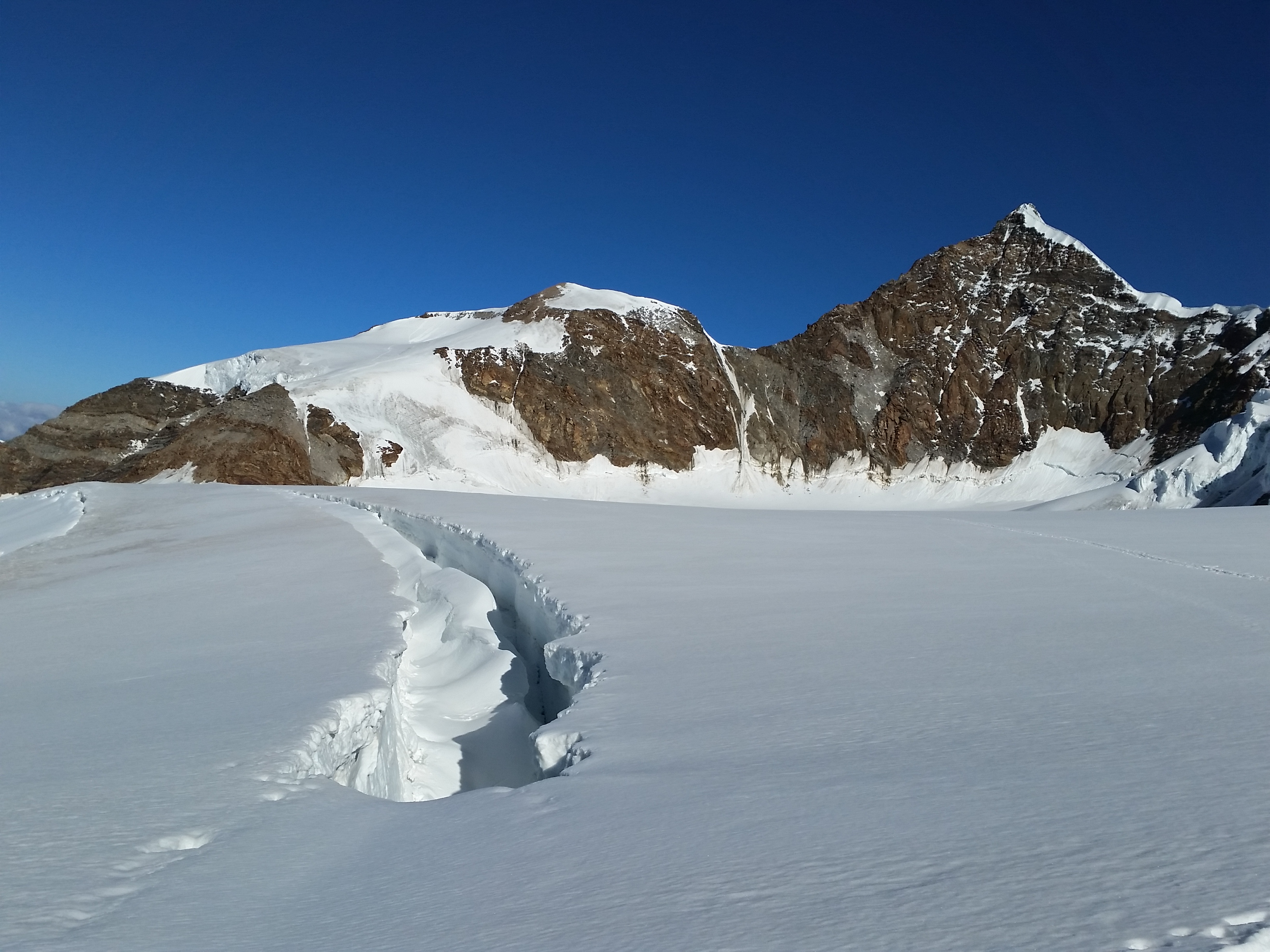
Lyskamm from the Glacier du Lys summer 2017

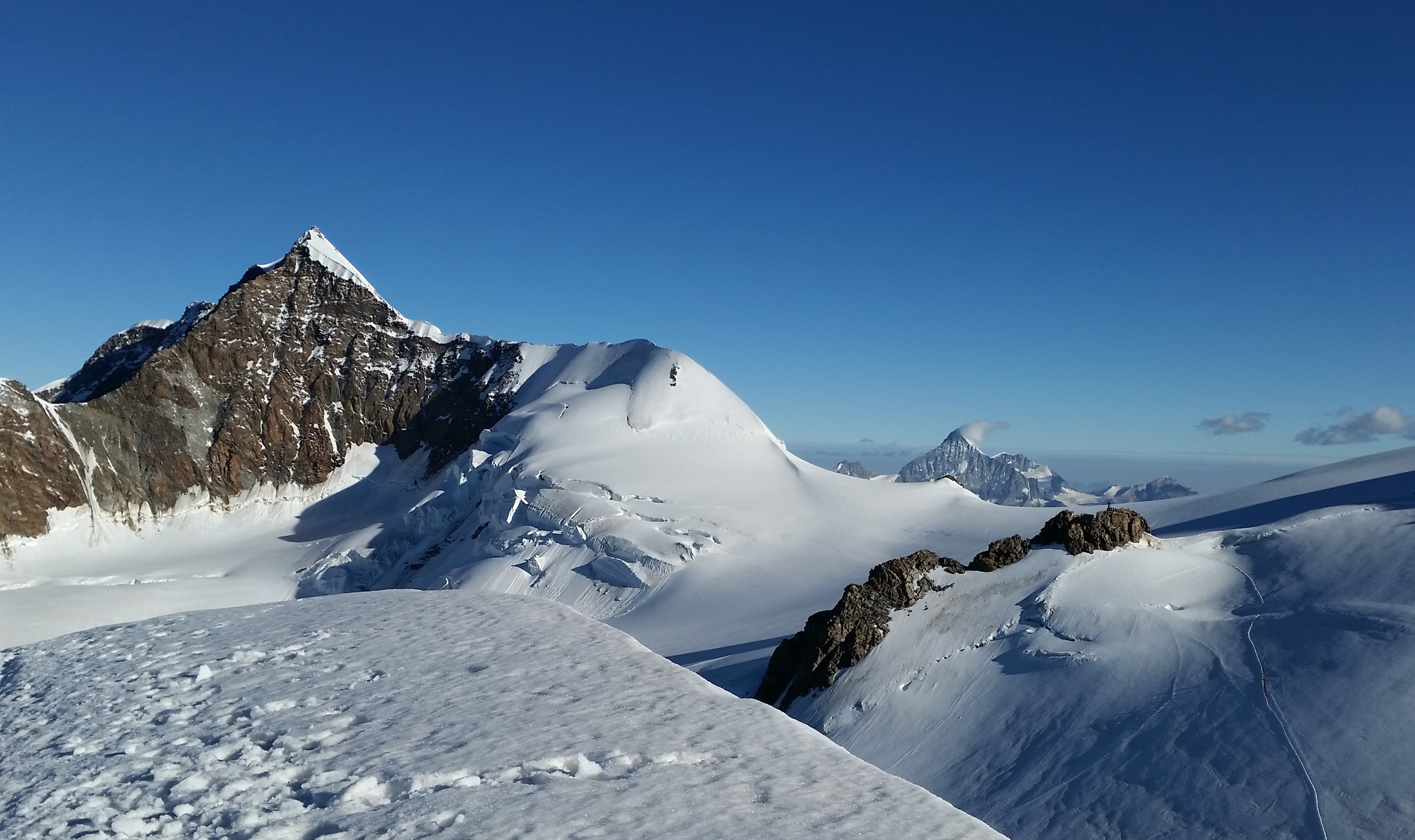
Lyskamm from the Pyramide Vincent summer 2017

== Geography ==
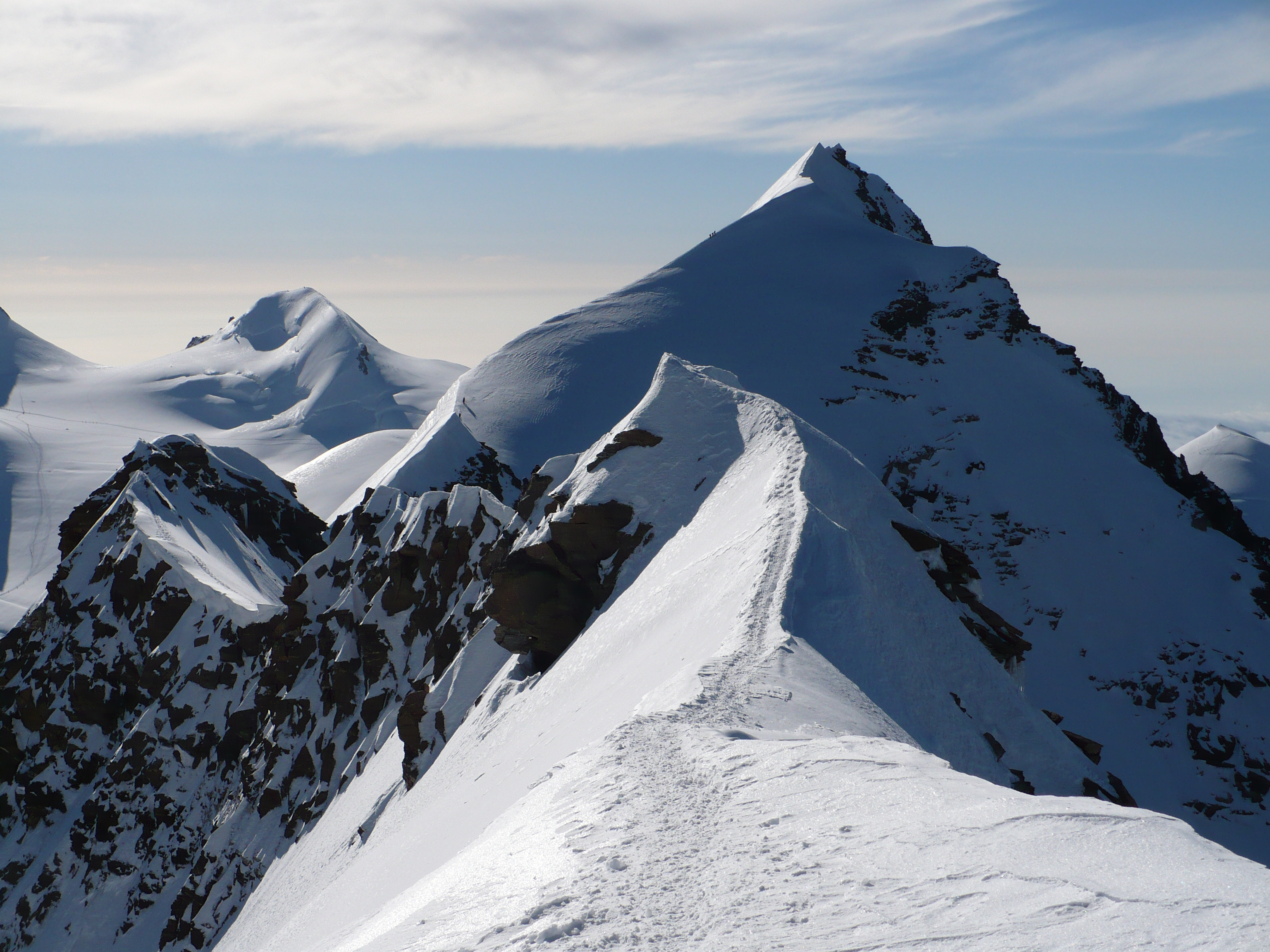
Lyskamm from Western Lyskamm

Despite a prominence of well over 300 metres, Lyskamm is sometimes considered to be part of the extended Monte Rosa group (in fact the Dufourspitze is only 107 metres higher). But visually Lyskamm is a huge massif, composed of two summits: the Eastern Lyskamm and the lower Western Lyskamm, separated by a 1 kilometre (0.62 mi) long ridge, both lying on the border between the Swiss canton of Valais (north) and the Italian region of the Aosta Valley (south).

The northern side of the mountain is an impressive 1,100 metres (3,600 ft) ice-covered wall, rising up from the Grenzgletscher. The gentler southern side rises only a few hundred metres above the glacier of the same name: Lysgletscher.

== Climbing history ==
The eastern and higher of the two peaks is 4,532 m, and was first ascended in 1861 from the Lisjoch up the east ridge by a 14-man team (seven Englishmen, one Scotsman, and six Swiss guides) led by J. F. Hardy and including William Edward Hall. Others in the party included A. C. Ramsey, F. Sibson, T. Rennison, J. A. Hudson, C. H. Pilkington and R. M. Stephenson. The guides were Franz Josef Lochmatter (1825-1897) of St. Niklaus in the canton Valais, J.-P. Cachet, K. Kerr, S. Zumtaugwald, P. and J.-M. Perren.

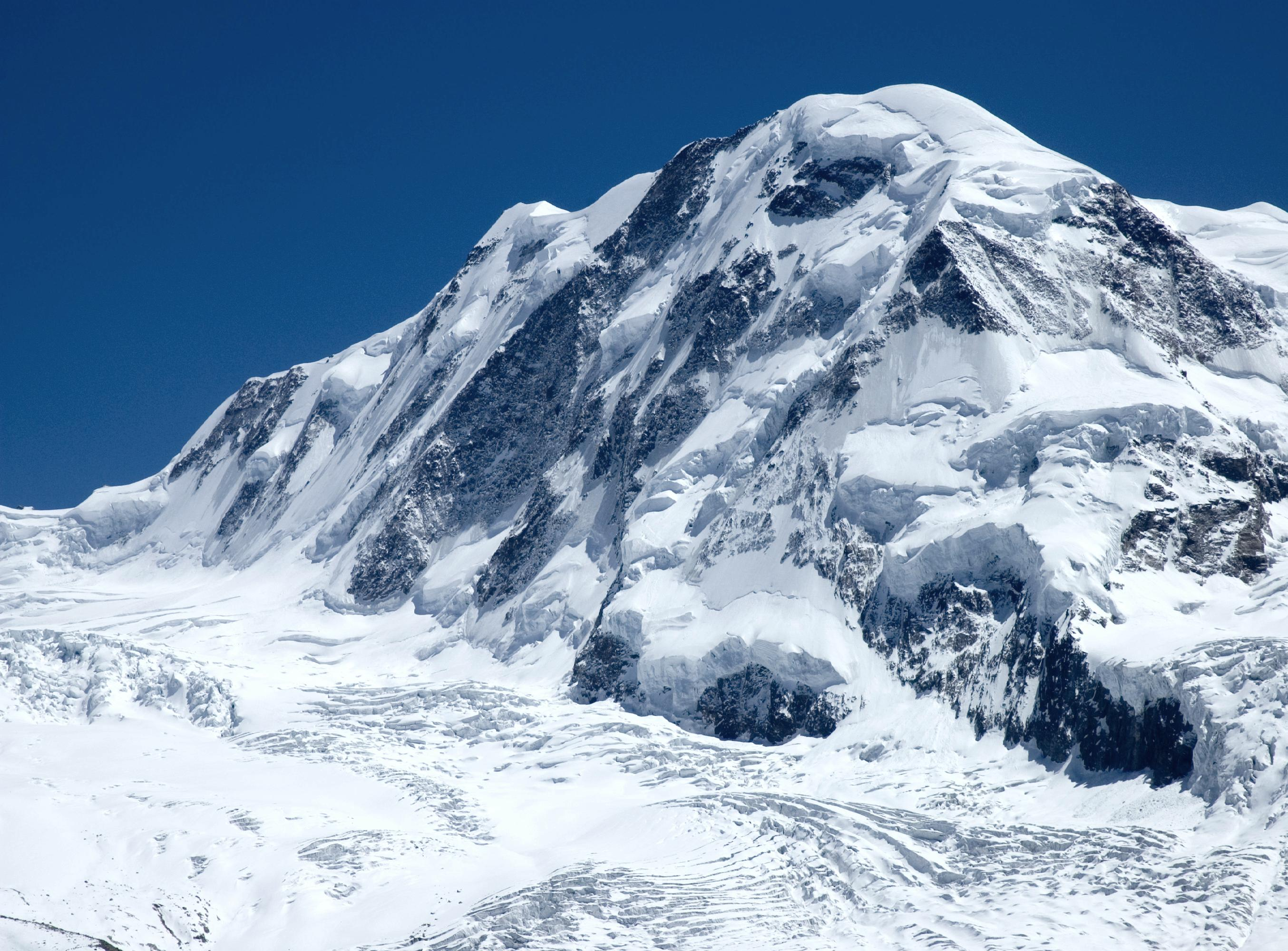
Lyskamm above the Grenzgletscher (English: Border Glacier)

The ridge as a whole (as well as the western summit) was first traversed three years later by Leslie Stephen, Edward N. Buxton, Jakob Anderegg and Franz Biener.

The first attempt to climb the imposing north-east face was made in 1880 by the brothers Kalbermatten. They were carried down to the glacier by an avalanche but they survived the accident. On 9 August 1890, Ludwig Norman-Neruda with guides Christian Klucker and J. Reinstadler were the first to reach the summit (Lyskamm East) by the north face, by what is now known as the "Norman-Neruda route". The first winter ascent of this route was made on 11 March 1956 by C. Fosson and O. Frachey.

In 1907, Geoffrey Winthrop Young and his guide traversed the whole ridge two times. Young wanted to traverse the ridge from the Nordend to the Breithorn. They started from Riffelalp at midnight and finished the traverse of the Monte Rosa massif at midday. But after the traverse of the Lyskamm and Castor the guide was too tired. Young, who was very disappointed, convinced him to go back by the Lisjoch before descending to Zermatt, implying a second traverse on the Lyskamm. Young even wanted to continue back to the Nordend but his guide refused to prolong the journey.

== Climbing routes ==
The normal route starts from the Lisjoch, which can be accessed from the Gnifetti Hut (3,650 m) or from the Monte Rosa Hut (2,883 m). The route follows the route taken by the first ascensionist.

The mountain is often climbed as a traverse from the Feliksjoch (West), to the Lisjoch (East) or vice versa. The traverse consists mostly of a narrow, snow-covered ridge, with some scrambling over rocks. In good conditions, this route is fairly easy and objectively safe, however in bad snow conditions and/or bad visibility, the ridge can be challenging because of large, sometimes double, cornices, mainly on the southern side of the ridge.

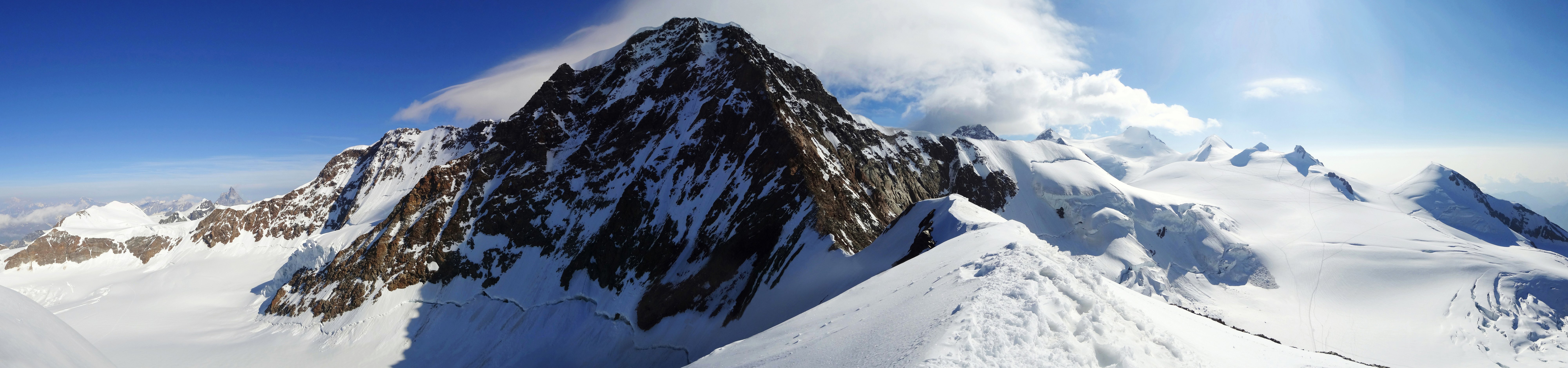
View from the Lyskamm Nase (south side)

== Bibliography ==
- W. E. Hall (1870) "The fatal accident on the Lyskamm", Alpine Journal, 5: 23–32

== See also ==
- List of Alpine four-thousanders
