= Ski touring =

Skiing on unmarked or unpatrolled areas

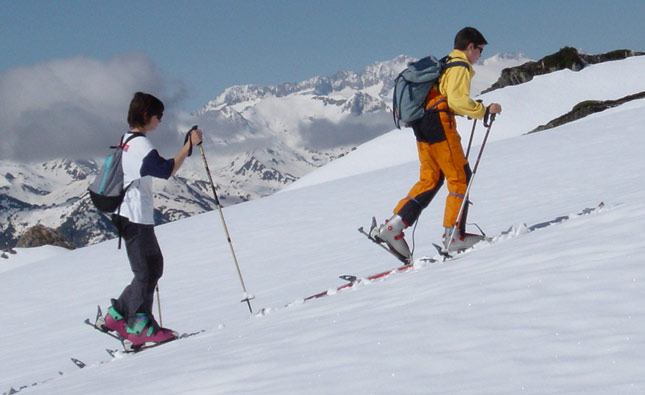
Free moving heels during the ascent are a defining characteristic of ski touring. After reaching the mountain top or other destination, the heel portions of the special touring bindings are fixated such that the skis behave like normal alpine skis on the typically long ride downhill.

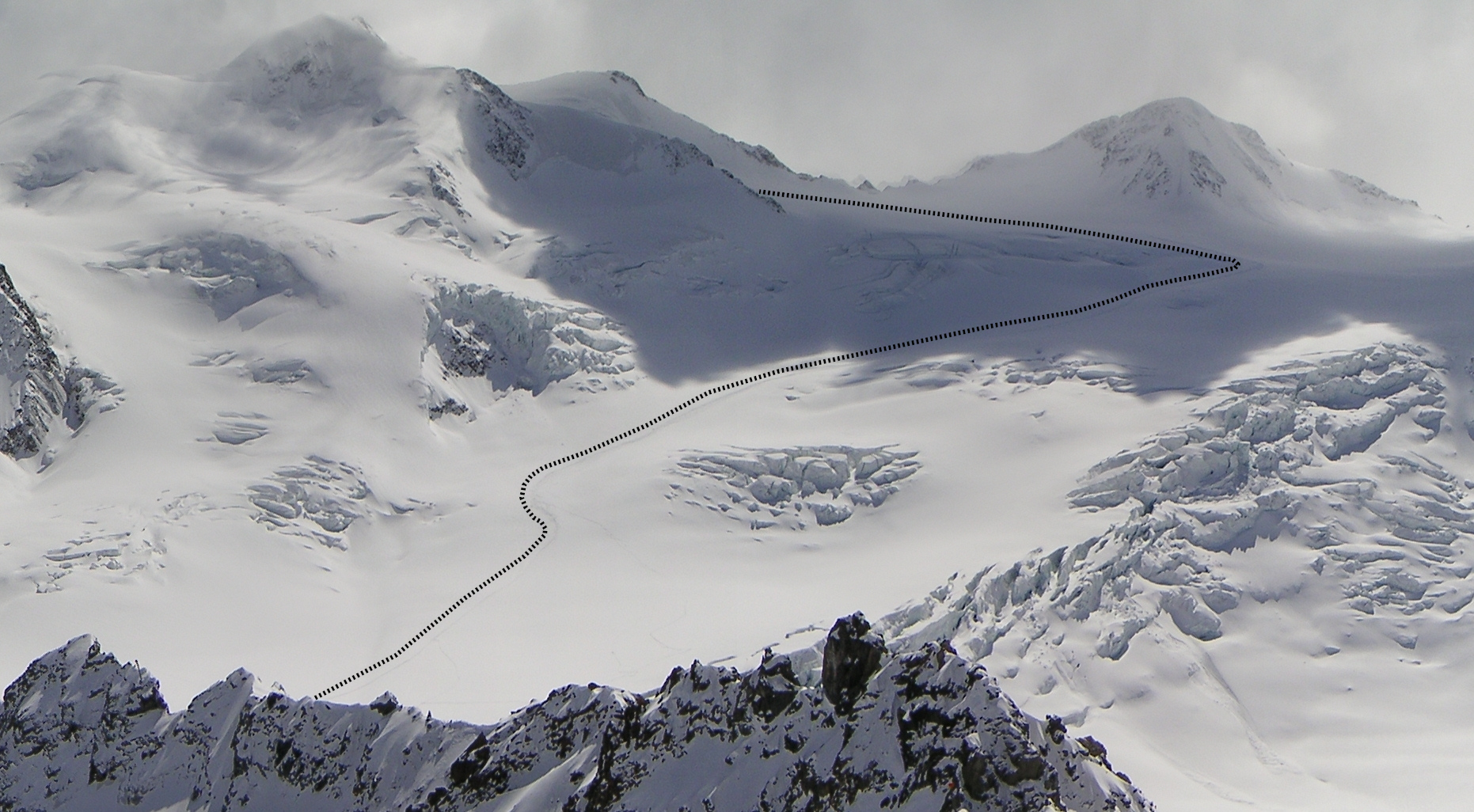
Marked ascent track of a previous ski tour to the Wildspitze (3.768 m) in Tyrolia in Austria. The route leads over the glacier Taschachferner, whereby the mountaineers made a detour around an area with open crevasses (middle).

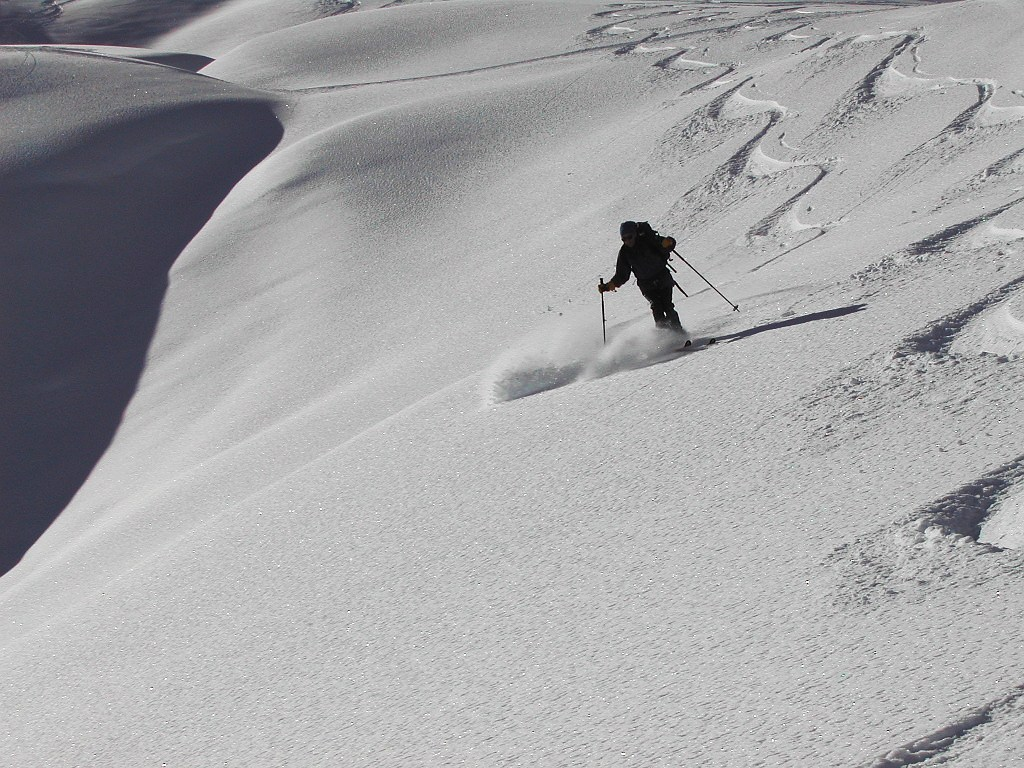
A descent from a mountain in Switzerland.

Ski touring is skiing in the backcountry on unmarked or unpatrolled areas. Touring is typically done off-piste and outside of ski resorts, and may extend over a period of more than one day. It is similar to backcountry skiing but excludes the use of a ski lift or transport. Ski touring can take place anywhere that has suitable snow and terrain as well as reasonable means of access to the trailhead, i.e. plowed roads, snowcats, aircraft or public transport.

Ski touring combines elements of Nordic and alpine skiing and embraces such sub-disciplines as Telemark and randonnée. A defining characteristic is that the skier's heels are "free" – i.e. not bound to the skis – in order to allow a natural gliding motion while traversing and ascending terrain which may range from perfectly flat to extremely steep.

Ski touring has been adopted by skiers seeking new snow, by alpinists, and by those wishing to avoid the high costs of traditional alpine skiing at resorts. Touring requires independent navigation skills and may involve route-finding through potential avalanche terrain. It has parallels with hiking and wilderness backpacking. Ski mountaineering is a form of ski touring which variously combines the sports of Telemark, alpine, and backcountry skiing with that of mountaineering.

== History ==
Among the pioneers of ski touring is John "Snowshoe" Thompson, perhaps the earliest modern ski mountaineer and a prolific traveler who used skis to deliver the mail at least twice a month over the steep eastern scarp of the Sierra Nevada to remote California mining camps and settlements. His deliveries began in 1855 and continued for at least 20 years. Thompson's route of 90 miles (140 km) took three days in and 48 hours back out with a pack that eventually exceeded 100 pounds (45 kg) of mail.

Cecil Slingsby, one of the earliest European practitioners, crossed the 1,550-metre-high (5,090 ft) Keiser Pass in Norway on skis in 1880. Other pioneers include Adolfo Kind, Arnold Lunn, Ottorino Mezzalama, Patrick Vallençant, and Kilian Jornet Burgada.

== Terminology ==
Ski touring involves both uphill and downhill travel without needing to remove skis. Various terms have emerged to refer to how the terrain is accessed and how close it is to services.

- Frontcountry refers to terrain that is off-trail (not maintained) but within ski area boundaries where ski lifts and emergency services are close at hand.
- Slackcountry refers to terrain that is outside of marked ski area boundaries and accessed from a lift without having to use skins or bootpack. Skiers often traverse to the point where they'll begin their descent, not gaining or losing any elevation. Usually this also includes terrain with access back to the lift as well. For purists, slackcountry touring may also include touring where people use a car as a shuttle.
- Sidecountry refers to terrain that is outside of ski area boundaries yet still accessible via a ski lift. Oftentimes sidecountry requires the skier to bootpack or skin to reach or return from the sidecountry area, but this is not required. Sidecountry terrain is typically not avalanche-mitigated by the ski areas, and proper avalanche skills and gear are necessary for safety.
- Backcountry refers to terrain in remote areas that is outside of ski area boundaries and not accessible via a ski lift.

== Equipment ==
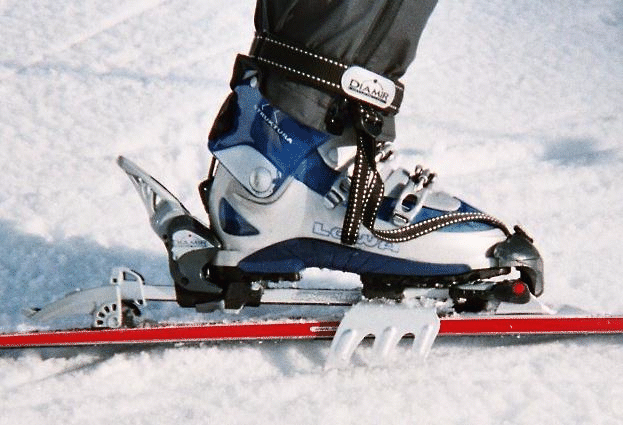
Alpine touring ski boot, binding, and ski crampon. The red spot below the toe portion is the pivot point of the binding about which the rest of the boot turns during a step, resulting in a movement similar, but not identical to a normal human walking movement - the shoe tip is always at the same height, because the skis are moved to glide at the snow surface level.

=== Styles of equipment ===
- Alpine skiing equipment can be used for ski touring with the addition of a removable binding insert that allows for free heel swing on ascents.
- Nordic ski touring is skiing with bindings that leave the heels free all the time. Thus, Nordic skiers do not have to change back and forth between uphill and downhill modes, which can be advantageous in rolling terrain. At the lighter, simpler end of the scale, Nordic skis may be narrow and edgeless cross-country types for groomed trails or ideal snow conditions, used with boots that resemble soft shoes or low boots. Backcountry Nordic uses a heavier setup than a traditional Nordic setup, but not as big and heavy as a full Telemark setup.
- Telemark skiing is at the heavier end of the Nordic skiing equipment spectrum, designed for steep backcountry terrain or ski-area use.
- Alpine Touring (AT) or randonnée equipment is specifically designed for ski touring in steep terrain; a special alpine touring binding, otherwise very similar to a downhill binding, allows the heel to be raised for ease in ascending but locked down for full support when skiing downhill.

=== Ascending aids ===
Various devices can be used to make ascending easier. "Fish scale" pattern friction aids embossed in the center section of the bottoms of the skis or sticky ski wax in the center pocket are used in lower-angle or rolling terrain. Climbing skins are used when fish scales or ski wax fail to provide sufficient grip for skiing steeply uphill. Ski crampons may be attached when conditions are particularly icy or the grade too steep for skins.

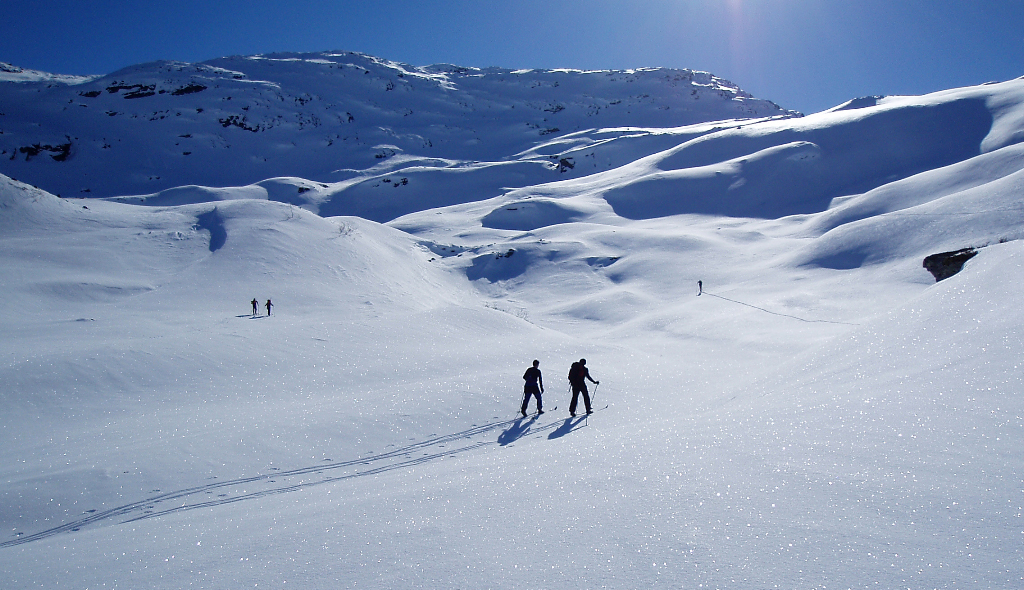
Skiers in western Norway

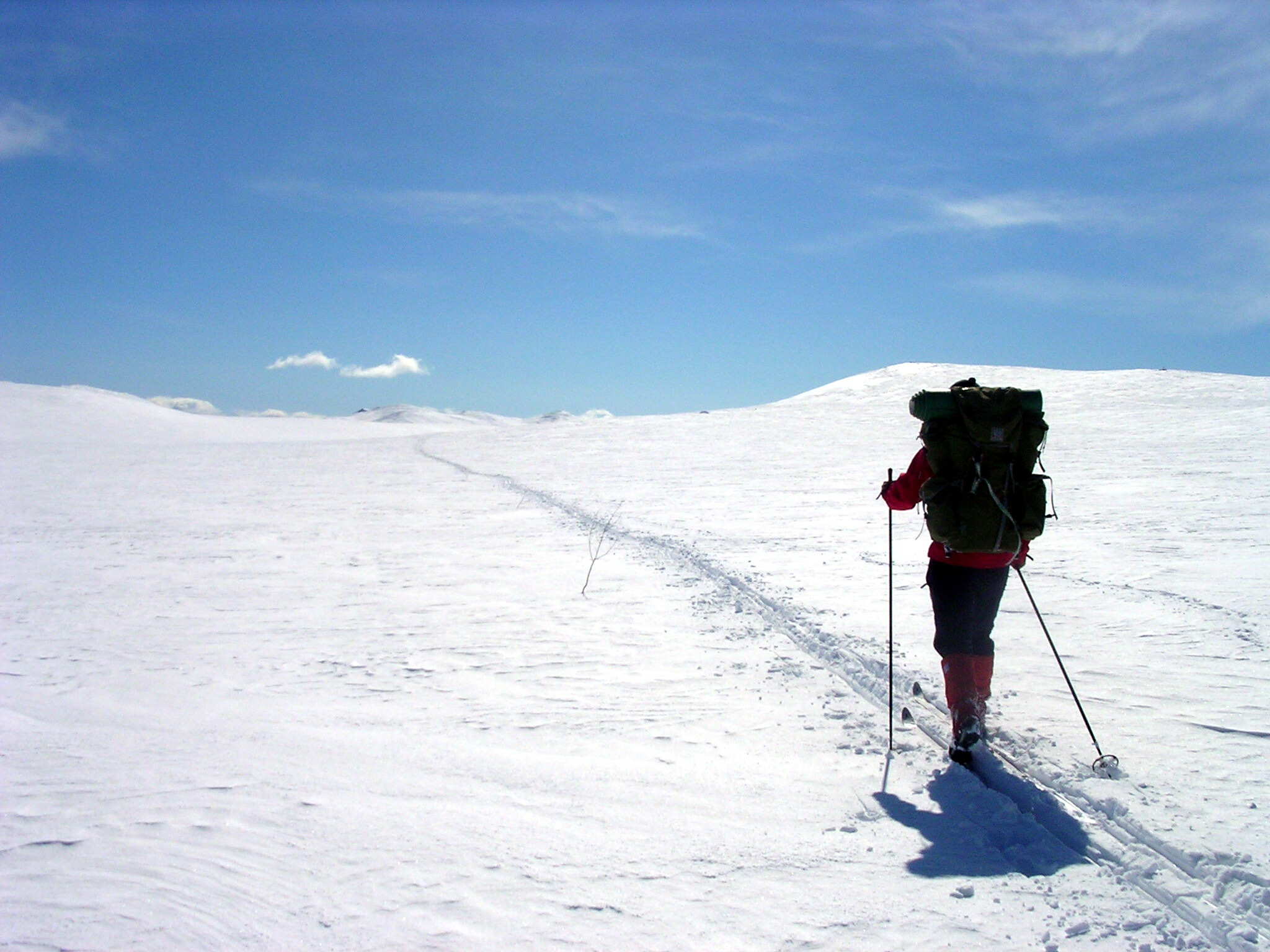
Spring ski touring on Hardangervidda, Norway

== See also ==
- Freeriding
- History of skiing
- Ski mountaineering
- Skiing and skiing topics
