= Mezzalama Skyrace =

The Mezzalama Skyrace was an international high altitude endurance race competition, defunct in 2008, in upper Valtournenche Valley, in the Aosta Valley, Italy. The summer event in the Monte Rosa's massif has been carried out annually by the Mezzalama Trophy association since 2000, and was also named in honor of the mountain guide Ottorino Mezzalama.

== Course description ==
The starting point is in Saint-Jacques (1,680 metres a.s.l.), a hamlet in Ayas. The participants pass Verraz (2,380 metres a.s.l.), Saint-Oyen, and then the Blue Lake (French: Lac Bleu), then they take back the main track and meet to the moraine of the Grand Glacier of Verraz (French: Grand glacier de Verraz, Italian: Grande Ghiacciaio di Verra) to reach the Refuge Ottorino Mezzalama, which is the turning point of the circuit. Total course length is 15 kilometres with a 1,356 metre altitude difference, to be finished in a maximum time of 4 hours.

== Winners ==
Year	Men's winner	Women's winner
2000	(Italy) Bruno Brunod	(Italy) Gloriana Pellissier
2001	(Italy) Bruno Brunod	(Italy) Gloriana Pellissier
2002	(Italy) Manfred Reichegger	(Italy) Gloriana Pellissier
2003	(Italy) Davide Bonansea	(Italy) Emanuela Brizio
2004	(Italy) Dennis Brunod	(Italy) Gloriana Pellissier
2005	(Italy) Paolo Bert	(Italy) Gloriana Pellissier
2006	(Italy) Dennis Brunod	(Italy) Gloriana Pellissier
2007	(Italy) Dennis Brunod	(Italy) Gloriana Pellissier
2008	(Italy) Dennis Brunod	(Italy) Gloriana Pellissier
2009	not held	
2010	not held	

== See also ==
- Skyrunner World Series
- Mezzalama Trophy
