= Ottorino Mezzalama =

Italian mountain climber (1888–1931)

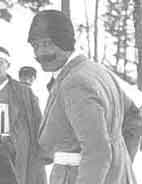
Ottorino Mezzalama (1888–1931)

Ottorino Mezzalama (born 25 September 1888 – 23 February 1931) was an Italian mountain climber, and is deemed to be one of the two pioneers of Italian ski mountaineering besides Luciano Roiti. He died in an avalanche accident in the Rochemolles Valley. The Ottorino Mezzalama Hut of the Club Alpino Italiano (CAI) below Pollux as well as the famous Mezzalama Trophy competition and the Mezzalama Skyrace were named in honor of him.

== Life ==
Mezzalama was born in Bologna and moved with his family to Turin on 28 March 1892. In his teens he gained first experiences in mountain climbing. He was a good friend of the Swiss engineer Adolfo Kind and of the artillery Lieutenant Luciano Roiti, who published "Delle marce sulla neve" (Italian for about marching on snow), a paper about ski mountaineering in the army. All three became members of the CAI and founded the Ski Club Torino.

After he finished school, Mezzalama began his studies at the university faculty of trading and economy, but had to leave the university because he was drafted by the army in 1909. In the Italo-Turkish War he was deployed in the rank of a Sergente at the Libyan front in 1912, and was awarded for his service. After his release in 1913, he continued his university studies as well as skiing and mountain climbing.

=== World War I ===
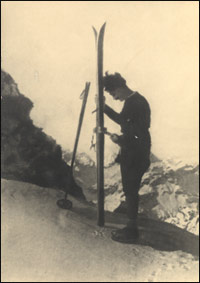
Mezzalama preparing his skis

In the course of the general Italian mobilization during World War I, he was drafted again by the army in October 1915. Together with his later friend Pietro Ghiglione, a mountain climber and writer, he served in the 3rd Alpini Regiment. Concerning to his advanced academic studies, he was made Sottotenente, became Tenente in 1916 and Capitano in 1917. During his services he was technical director of military ski training. He gave his first course at the Little St Bernard Pass, the second in the Champorcher Valley, and further ones in several alpine areas apart the conflict areas. All in all he trained about 3,000 "White Warriors from the Adamello" of 26 skiing units of 13 battalions until 1917, the year when the 3rd Alpini Regiment got the name affix "Courmayeur"

It is reported that Mezzalama always wore a big 15–25 kg rucksack on his ski tours, that he never left to anybody. In care of possible surprises in the mountains, it contained all essentially things. Mezzalama commented, that the only thing, that would be really plannable was the start of a ski tour, never the return.

=== Postwar period ===
After the war he, returned to the university and lived together with his mother. Additionally he explored the Alps on ski and amongst others, he took part in the first Italian complete Mont Blanc ski-run in 1927.

Mezzolama was one of the volunteers, who took part in a search and rescue action, after an avalanche descended in the Rochemolles Valley upside the Bardonecchia in 1931. 20 Alpinis of the 3rd Regiment were missed.

...with his long, gangly gait which never betrayed any signs of fatigue or the difficulty of the ascent, he walked with all that equipment on, which made him resemble a soldier on fatigue; every so often he would raise his eyes calmly upwards and his pointed moustache added an almost dated touch of warmth to his thin, dark face.

— Angelo Manaresi

Mezzalama and Domenico Mazzocchi were overtaken by a thunderstorm on the peak of the Bicchiere, and were urged to stay in the frosty "Elena" Hut (today: "Rifugio Gino Biasi") for three days. They were both worn out, when they descended on the fourth day, and when an avalanche caught Mezzalama and carried him downhill. Mazzocchi tried to find him till the darkness rose, but his attempts were in vain. On the next day, his corpse was found by a team of the CAI Bolzano section.

== Literature ==
- Umberto Pelazza, Antonio Vizzi: Mezzalama Trophy - Myth and Reality 1933–1997.

== See also ==
- Refuge Ottorino Mezzalama
- Mezzalama Trophy
- Mezzalama Skyrace
