= Pollux (mountain) =

Mountain in the Pennine Alps

- Italian: Polluce
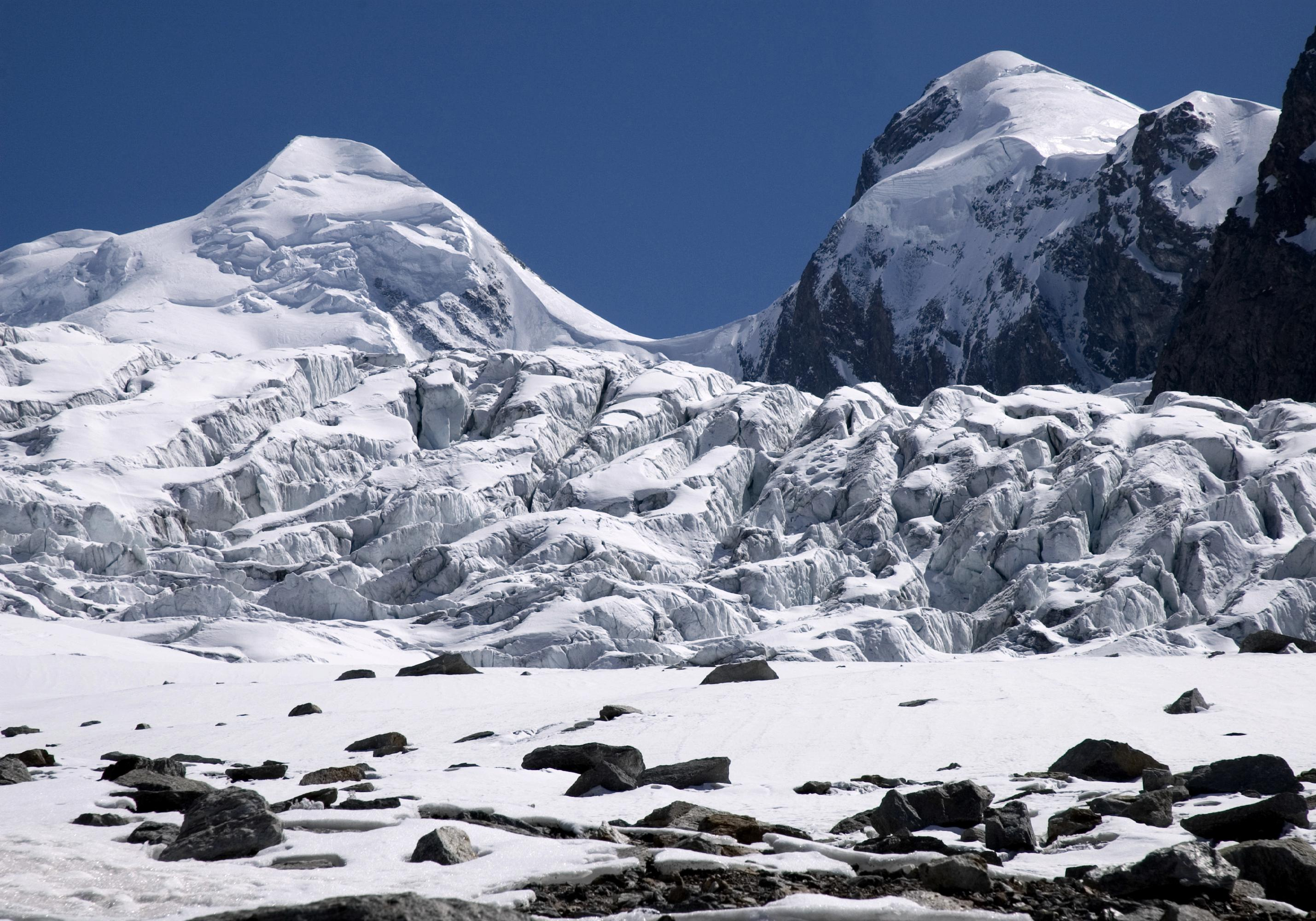
- Pollux (right) and Castor (left), from the Grenzgletscher (English: Border Glacier)

Highest point
- Elevation: 4,089 m (13,415 ft)
- Prominence: 243 m (797 ft)
- Parent peak: Dufourspitze
- Coordinates: 45°55′40″N 7°47′07″E

Geography
- Location within Alps
- Location: On the Italian (Aosta) – Swiss (Valais) border
- Countries: Italy and Switzerland
- Parent range: Pennine Alps
- Topo map: Swiss Federal Office of Topography swisstopo

Climbing
- First ascent: 1 August 1864 by Jules Jacot with guides Josef-Marie Perren and Peter Taugwalder (father)
- Easiest route: South-east ridge (passages of UIAA I+)

Pollux (Italian: Polluce) is a mountain in the Pennine Alps on the border between Valais, Switzerland and the Aosta Valley in Italy. It is the lower of a pair of twin peaks (German: Zwillinge), the other being Castor, named after the Gemini twins of Roman mythology. Pollux's summit reaches an elevation of 4,089 m (13,415 ft). It is separated from Castor by a pass at 3,846 m (12,618 ft), named Passo di Verra in Italian, Col de Verra in French and Zwillingsjoch in German.

The first ascent was by Jules Jacot from Geneva with guides Josef-Marie Perren and Peter Taugwalder (father) on August 1 (the Swiss national day) 1864. Their route was via the Schwarztor, a pass first crossed by John Ball and Gabriel Zumtaugwald in 1845. The impressive north ridge was first climbed by Captain John Percy Farrar (a future President of the Alpine Club) and Wylie Lloyd with guide Josef Pollinger of St. Niklaus in the canton Valais on 18 August 1893.

Ascents are usually made from the Refuge Ottorino Mezzalama (3,036 m), the Monte Rosa hut (2,795 m); if traversing the peaks via Pollux's north ridge, PD+, the Refuge Quintino Sella au Félik (3,585 m), and the Rossi-Volante bivouac hut (3,850 m).

The first winter and ski ascent of Pollux was by Dr Alfred von Martin and Karl Planck on 7 March 1913.

== See also ==
- List of 4000 metre peaks of the Alps
