= Castor (mountain) =

Mountain in the Pennine Alps

- Italian: Castore
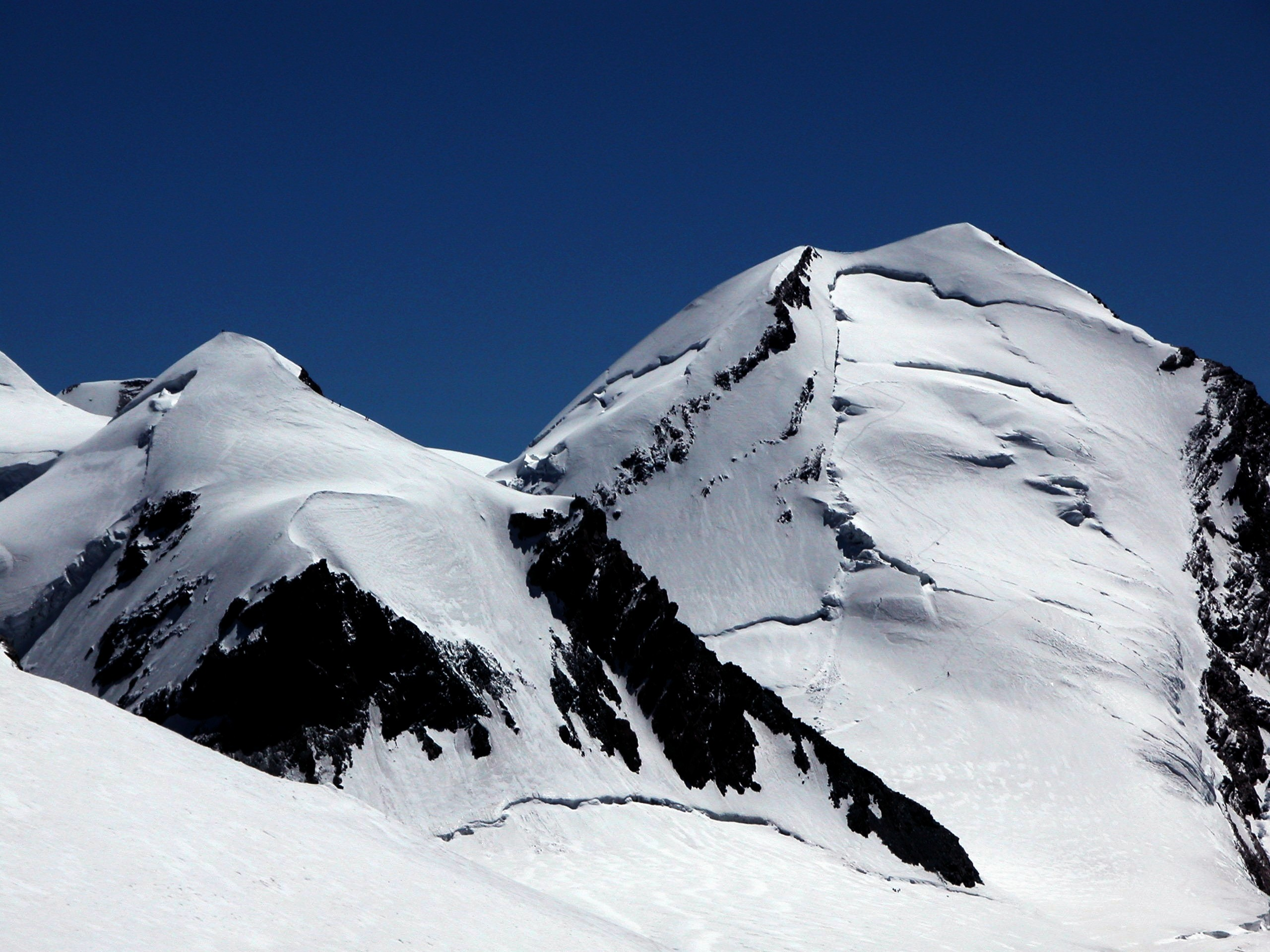
- Pollux (left) and Castor (right)

Highest point
- Elevation: 4,225 m (13,862 ft)
- Prominence: 156 m (512 ft)
- Parent peak: Dufourspitze
- Coordinates: 45°55′20″N 7°47′34″E

Geography
- Location within Alps
- Location: On the Swiss (Valais) – Italian (Aosta Valley) border
- Countries: Switzerland and Italy
- Parent range: Pennine Alps
- Topo map: Swiss Federal Office of Topography swisstopo

Climbing
- First ascent: August 23, 1861 by F. W. Jacomb and William Mathews with guide Michel Croz

Castor (Italian: Castore) is a mountain in the Pennine Alps on the border between Valais, Switzerland and the Aosta Valley in Italy. It is the higher of a pair of twin peaks (German: Zwillinge), the other being Pollux, named after the Gemini twins of Roman mythology. Castor's peak is at an elevation of 4,225 m (13,862 ft), and it lies between Breithorn and the Monte Rosa. It is separated from Pollux by a pass at 3,847 m (12,621 ft), named Passo di Verra in Italian and Zwillingsjoch in German.

Ascents are usually made from the alpine hut Capanna Quintino Sella on the Italian side, by means of the Felikjoch and the long and narrow southeast ridge. From the Swiss side, ascents start from Klein Matterhorn and go by way of the Italian glacier Grand Glacier of Verra and the mountain's west flank. The first ascent was made on August 23, 1861.

== Image gallery ==
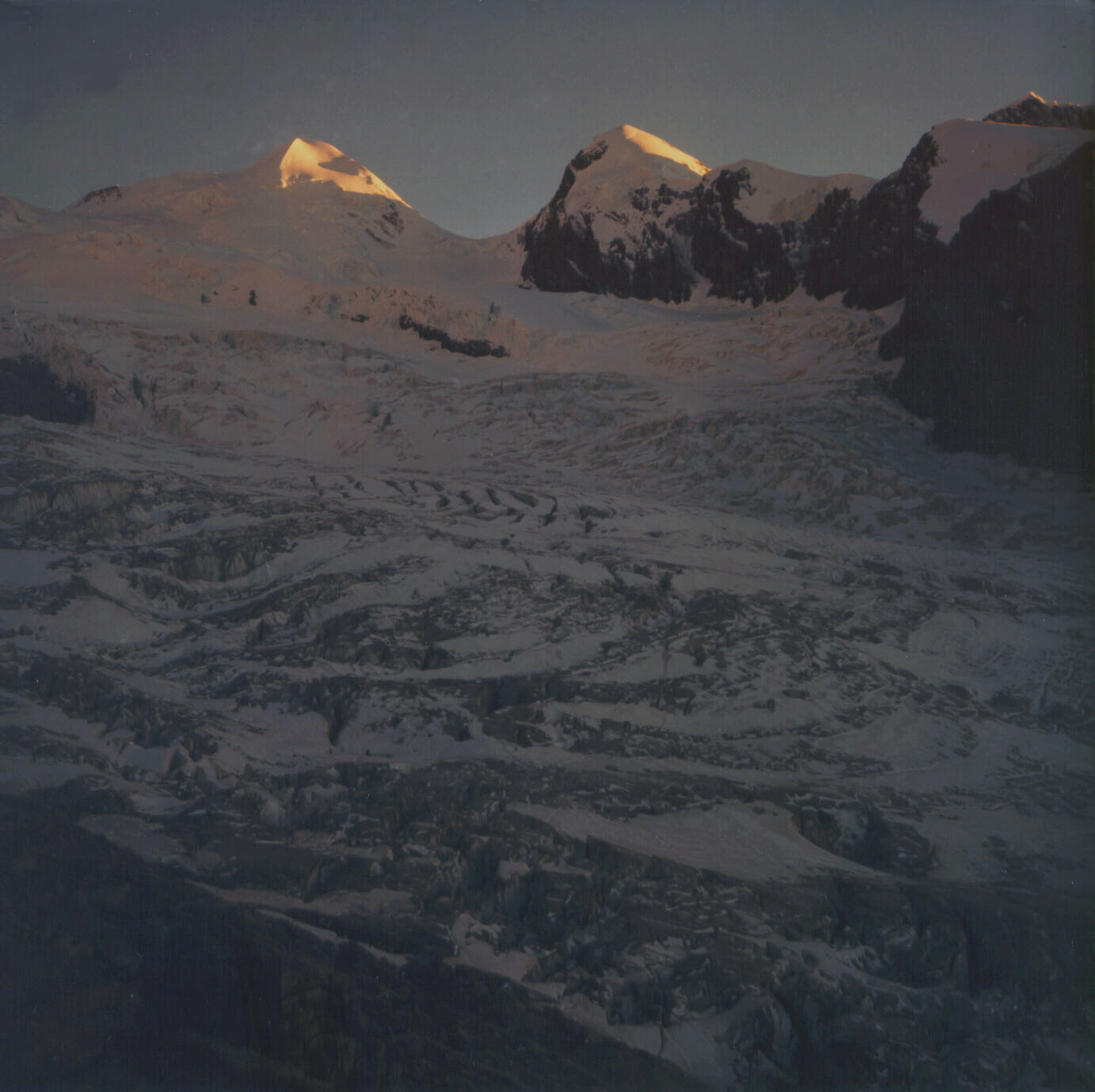
Castor (left) and Pollux (right) above the Zwillingsgletscher (English: Twin Glacier) in the back and the lower Grenzgletscher (English: Border Glacier) in front

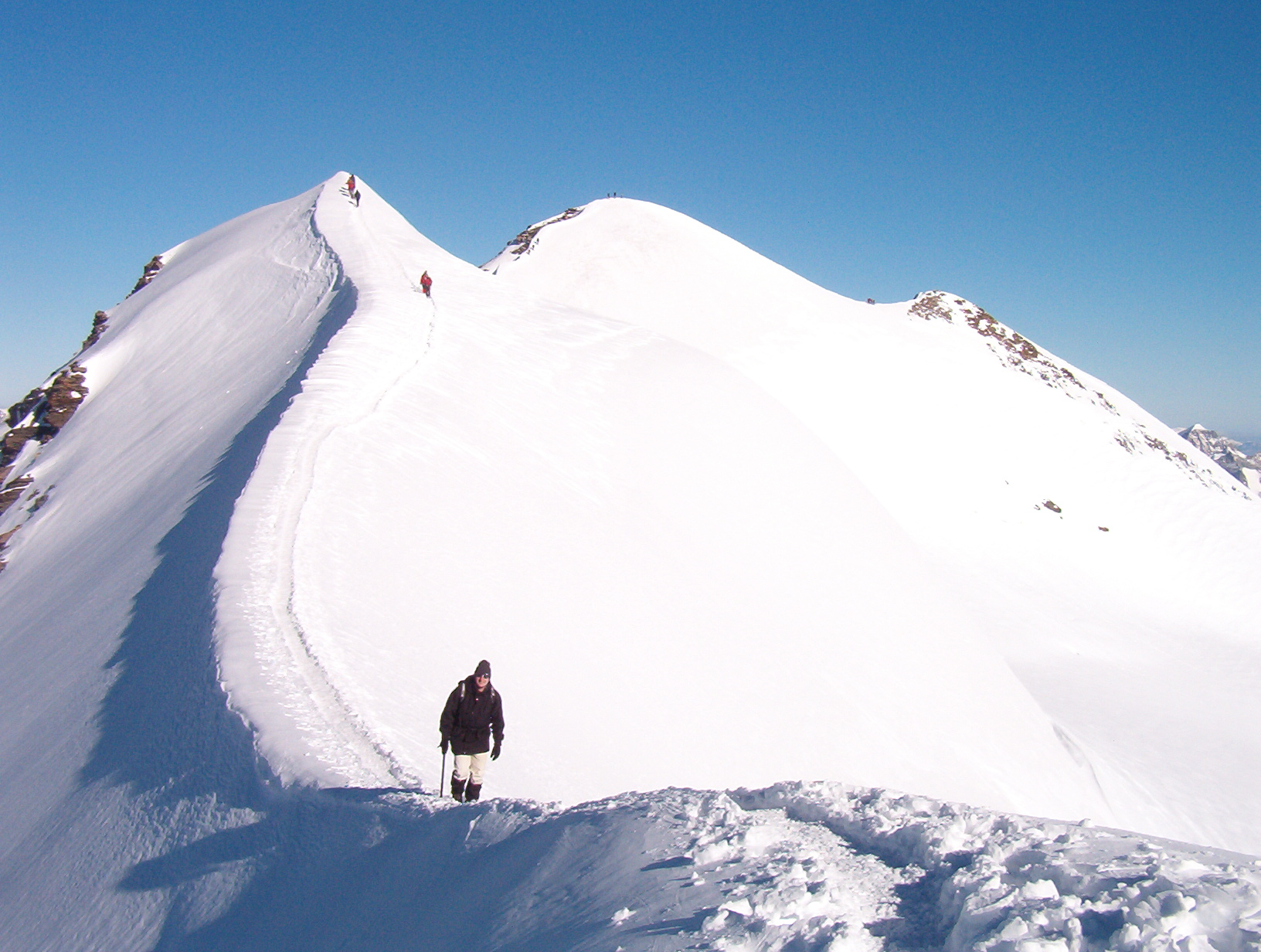
Climbing along the summit ridge

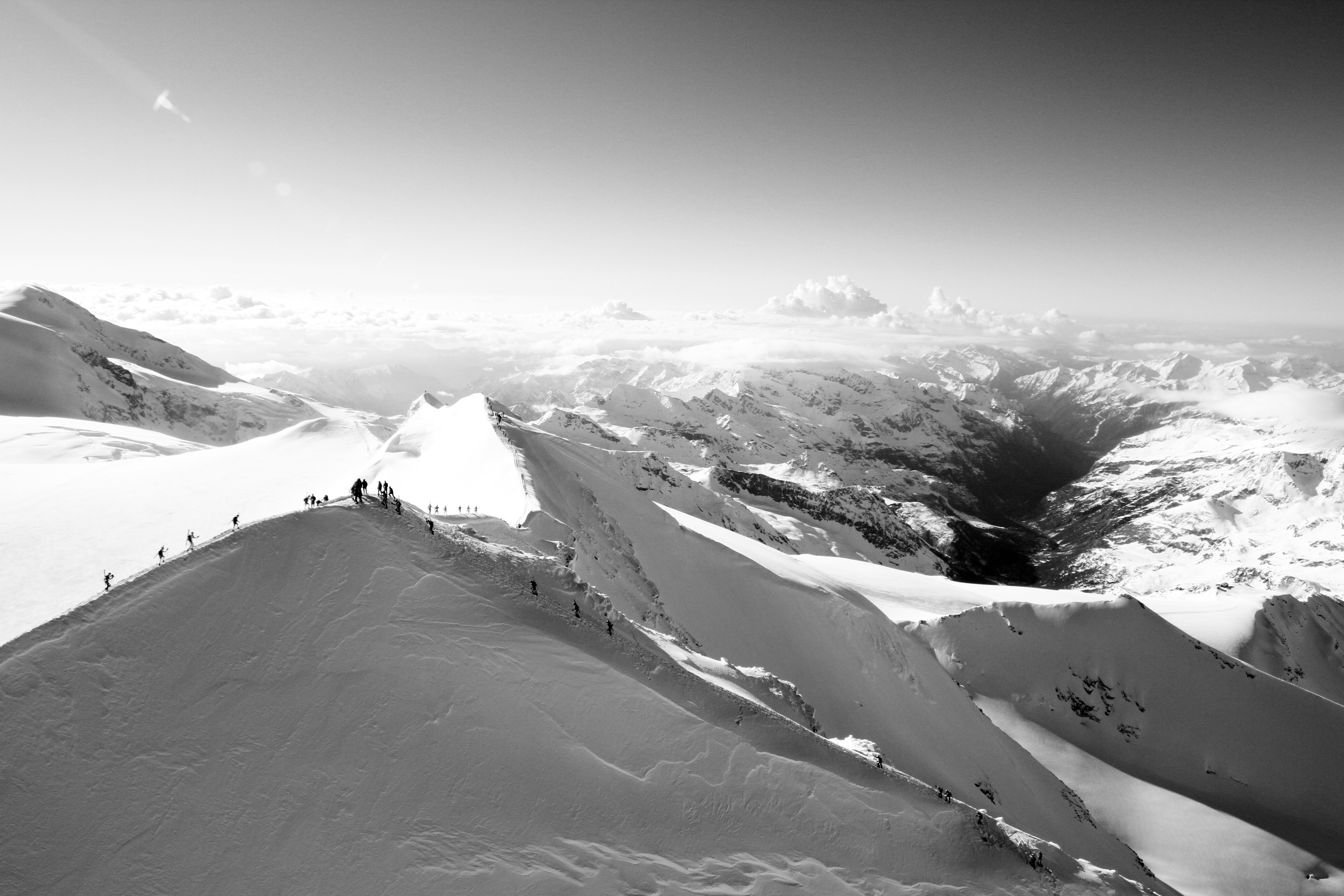
Castor in black and white

== See also ==
- List of 4000 metre peaks of the Alps
