= Paolo Kind =

Italian ski jumper and sports official

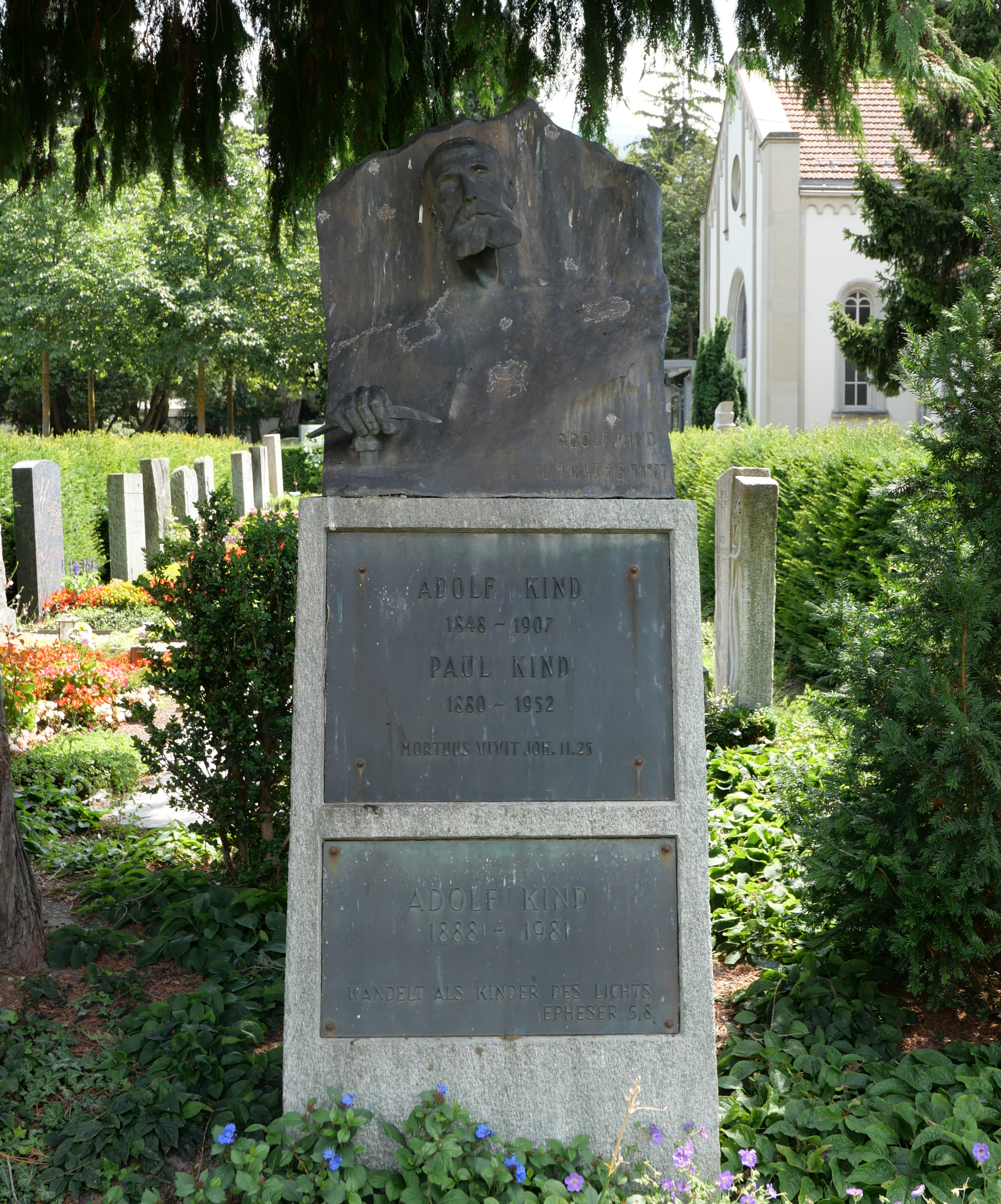
The grave of Kind, his father and another Adolf Kind (1888-1981) at the Daleu cemetery in Chur, canton of Grisons (Switzerland).

Paolo Kind (1880-1952) was an early Italian ski jumper and sports official.

Paolo Kind was a son of Adolfo Kind. He started skiing in the 1890s. When his father died in an mountaineering accident in 1907, he followed him as the second president of the Ski Club Torino. On November 7, 1908, Kind founded the Unione Ski Club Italiani (USCI), of which he was the first president, and which later passed into the FISI. Together with the Norwegian ski jumper Harald Smith, he designed the first ski jumping hill of Italy in Bardonecchia in 1908, which was finished in 1909, the year when Kind won the first Italian championship of ski jumping on this hill.
