= Gorner Glacier =

Glacier on the Monte Rosa massif

- Gornergletscher
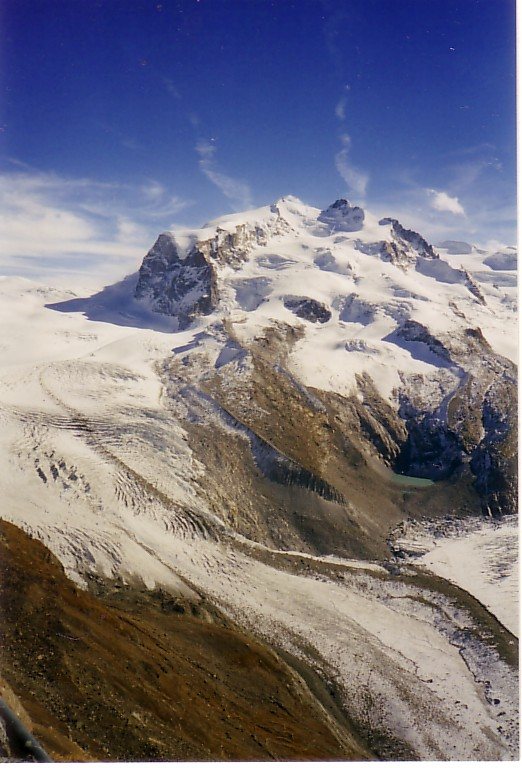
- Gorner Glacier (left), central Monte Rosa massif with Monte Rosa Glacier, and the confluence with the Grenzgletscher (2006)

- Location within Switzerland Location within Canton of Valais Location within Alps
- Interactive map of Gorner Glacier
- Type: Valley glacier
- Location: Valais, Switzerland
- Coordinates: 45°58′11″N 7°48′6″E
- Area: 60 km^{2} (23 sq mi) (1973)
- Length: 12.4 km (7.7 mi) (2014)
- Status: Retreating

The Gorner Glacier (German: Gornergletscher) is a valley glacier found on the west side of the Monte Rosa massif close to Zermatt in the canton of Valais, Switzerland. It is about 12.4 km (7.7 mi) long (2014) and 1 to 1.5 km (0.62 to 0.93 mi) wide. The entire glacial area of the glacier related to Gorner Glacier is 53 km^{2} (20 sq mi) (2007), which makes it the second largest glacial system in the Alps after the Aletsch Glacier system; however, in length it ranks third behind the Aletsch and Fiescher Glaciers.

== Features ==
=== Relationship to other glaciers ===
Numerous smaller glaciers connect with the Gorner Glacier. Its (former) tributaries are (clockwise on this map) the Gorner Glacier (after which the whole system is named, although the upper part is now disconnected from the lower part), Monte Rosa Glacier, Grenzgletscher (nowadays by far its main tributary, now disconnected from the Gorner Glacier proper), Zwillingsgletscher, Schwärzegletscher, Breithorngletscher, Triftjigletscher, and Unterer Theodulgletscher (the last three now disconnected).

The Grenzgletscher (English: Border Glacier) between the central Monte Rosa massif and the Liskamm to the south is nowadays the main contributor to the lower Gorner Glacier. The Gorner Glacier's upper part is almost already disconnected from its lower part. The former tributaries Breithorngletscher, Triftjigletscher, and Unterer Theodulgletscher lost their connections to the Gorner Glacier during the twentieth century; the Unterer Theodulgletscher became disconnected in the 1980s.

=== Gornersee lake ===
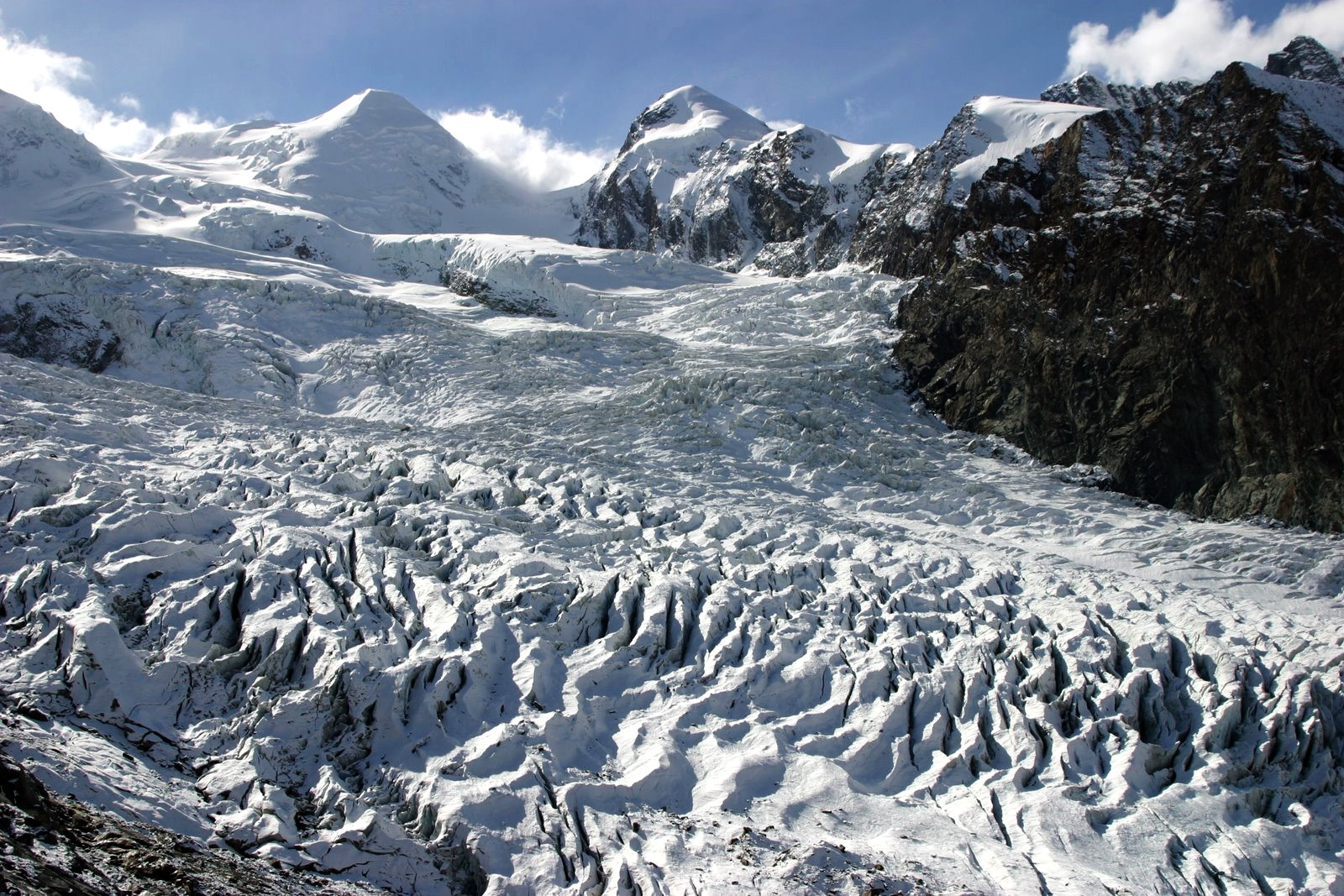
Grenzgletscher (English: Border Glacier) in front with Castor and Pollux above the Zwillingsgletscher (English: Twin Glacier) in the back (as seen near from the Old Monte Rosa Hut, 2006)

A notable feature of this glacier is the Gornersee, an ice marginal lake at the confluence area of the Gorner Glacier and Grenzgletscher. This lake fills every year and drains in summer, usually as a glacial lake outburst flood. This is one of only a few glacial lakes in the Alps exhibiting this behavior.

There are also notable surface features including crevasses and "table top" forms where large surface boulders have been left stranded above the glaciers surface. These tabular rocks are supported by ice that the boulder has sheltered from melting that has affected the more exposed surrounding ice.

=== Gornera river ===
The glacier is the source of the river Gornera, which flows down through Zermatt itself. However, most of its water is captured by a water catchment station of the Grande Dixence hydroelectric power plant. This water then ends up in the Lac des Dix, the main reservoir of Grande Dixence.

The glacier as well as the surrounding mountains can be seen from the Gornergrat (3,100 m or 10,200 ft), connected from Zermatt by the Gornergrat Railway.

== Glacial retreat ==
Like almost all other glaciers in the Alps, and most glaciers on the globe as well, the Gorner Glacier is retreating as a result of global warming—in this case, dramatically so. As of 2014, Gorner Glacier had been retreating about 30 metres (98 ft) every year, but with a record loss of 290 metres (950 ft) in 2008. Since its last major expansion (in the modern era, after the last glacial period) in 1859, it had lost more than 2,700 metres (8,900 ft) in distance.

As of about 2015, the Gorner Glacier had retreated to the point where it lost touch with its main tributary: the Grenzgletscher (English: Border Glacier) on the south side of the Monte Rosa massif. The Gorner Glacier proper is found on the north side. Now the prominent flow visible from Gornergrat is properly called the Grenzgletscher and can no longer be considered part of the Gorner Glacier. The Monte Rosa Glacier in the middle has also lost touch with the Gorner Glacier. This can be seen in a comparison of photographs over the years:

Gorner Glacier
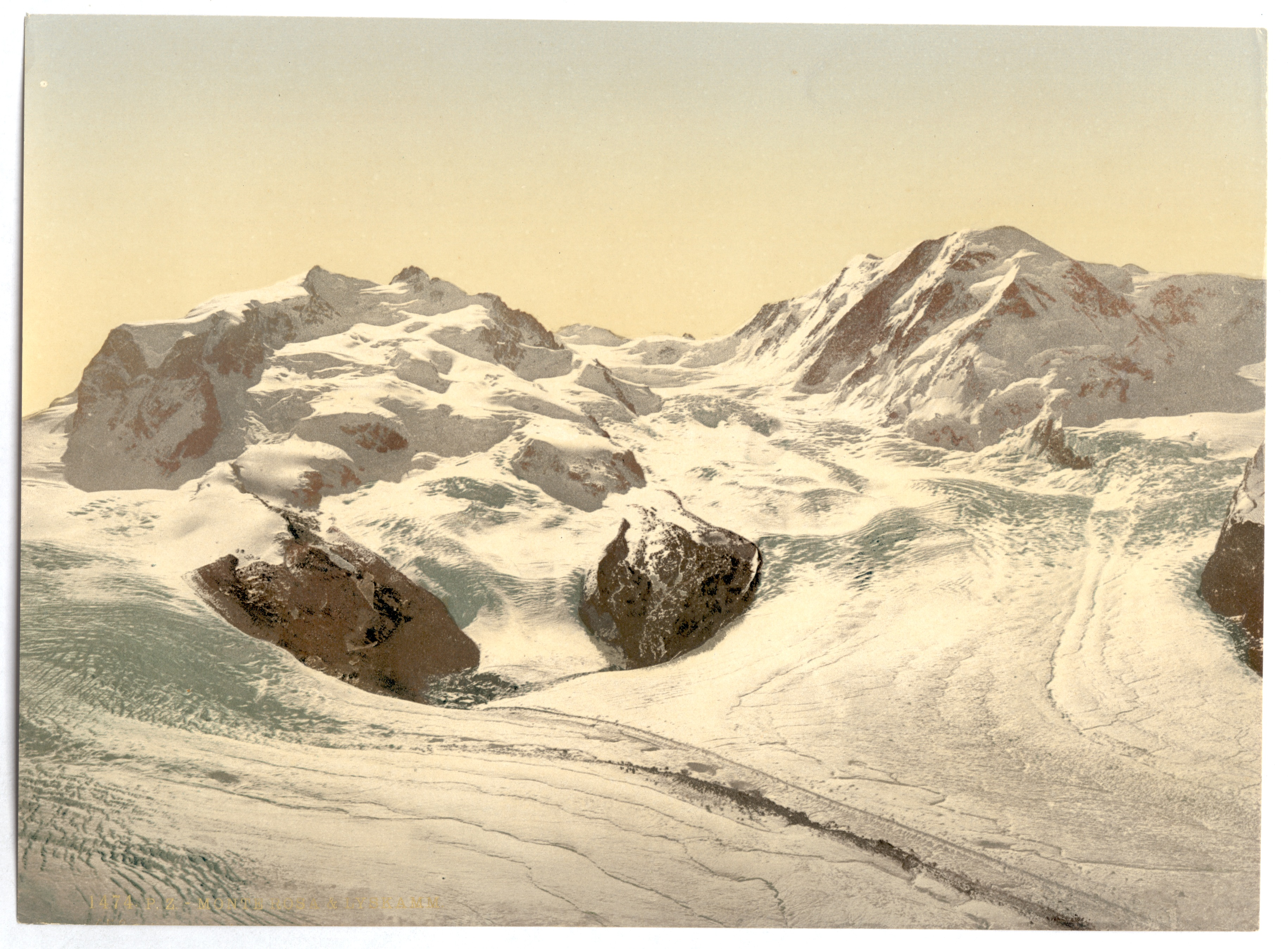
Around 1890–1900 (photomechanical print): The upper Gorner Glacier (left) is still the main tributary of the lower part; the old Monte Rosa Hut (built 1894–95) would have been found just few metres above the north-eastern border of the Grenzgletscher (in the middle; compare with the third picture).

1914–1918: Swiss Army patrol during World War I overlooking the confluence of the Gorner Glacier and Grenzgletscher; even the Monte Rosa Glacier in the middle still has contact to the Gorner Glacier.

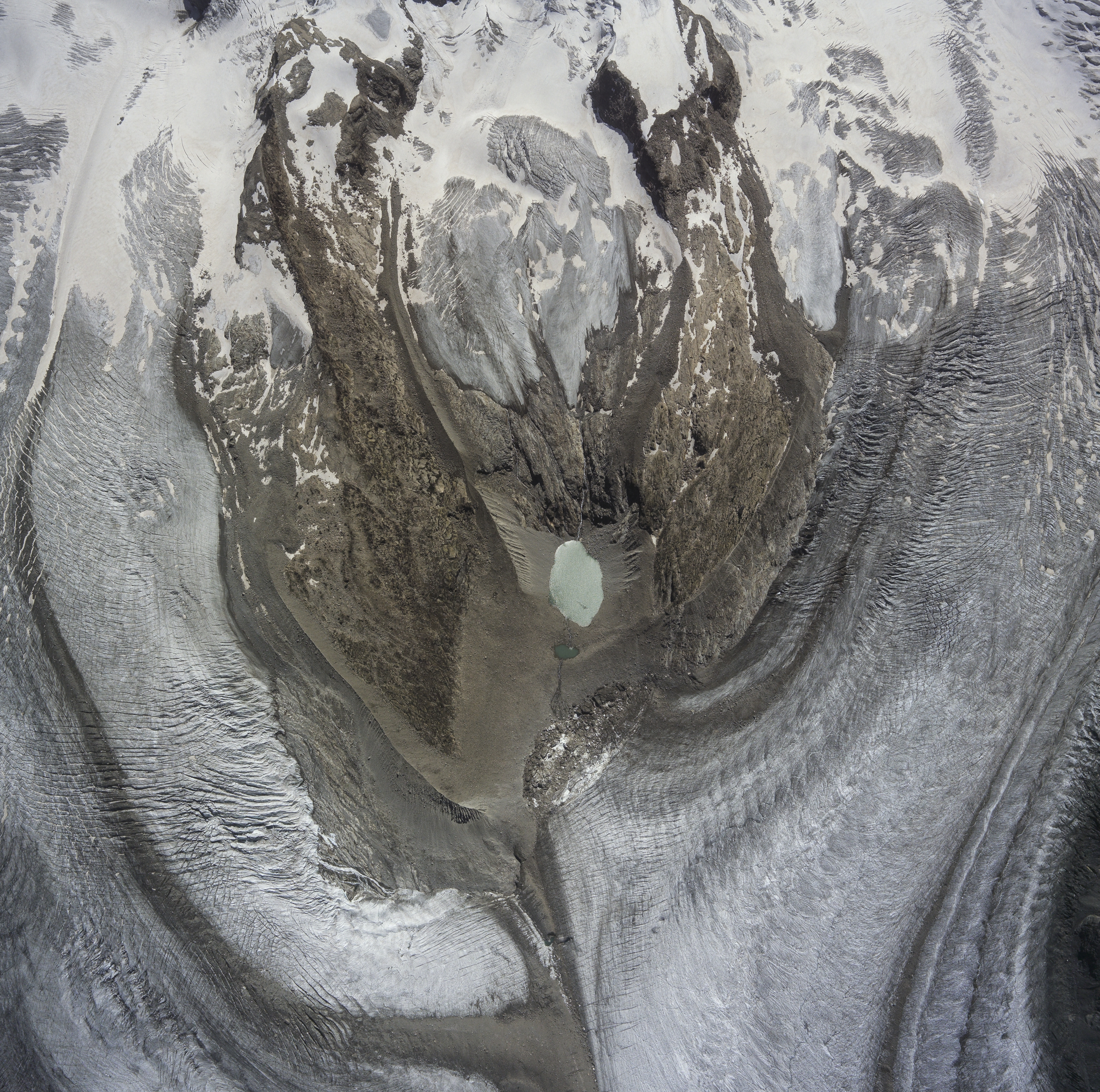
1994: Aerial photo from August 1994 with Gorner Glacier on the left and Grenzgletscher on the right, framing the Monte Rosa massif in the middle. The Monte Rosa Glacier no longer joins the Gorner Glacier.

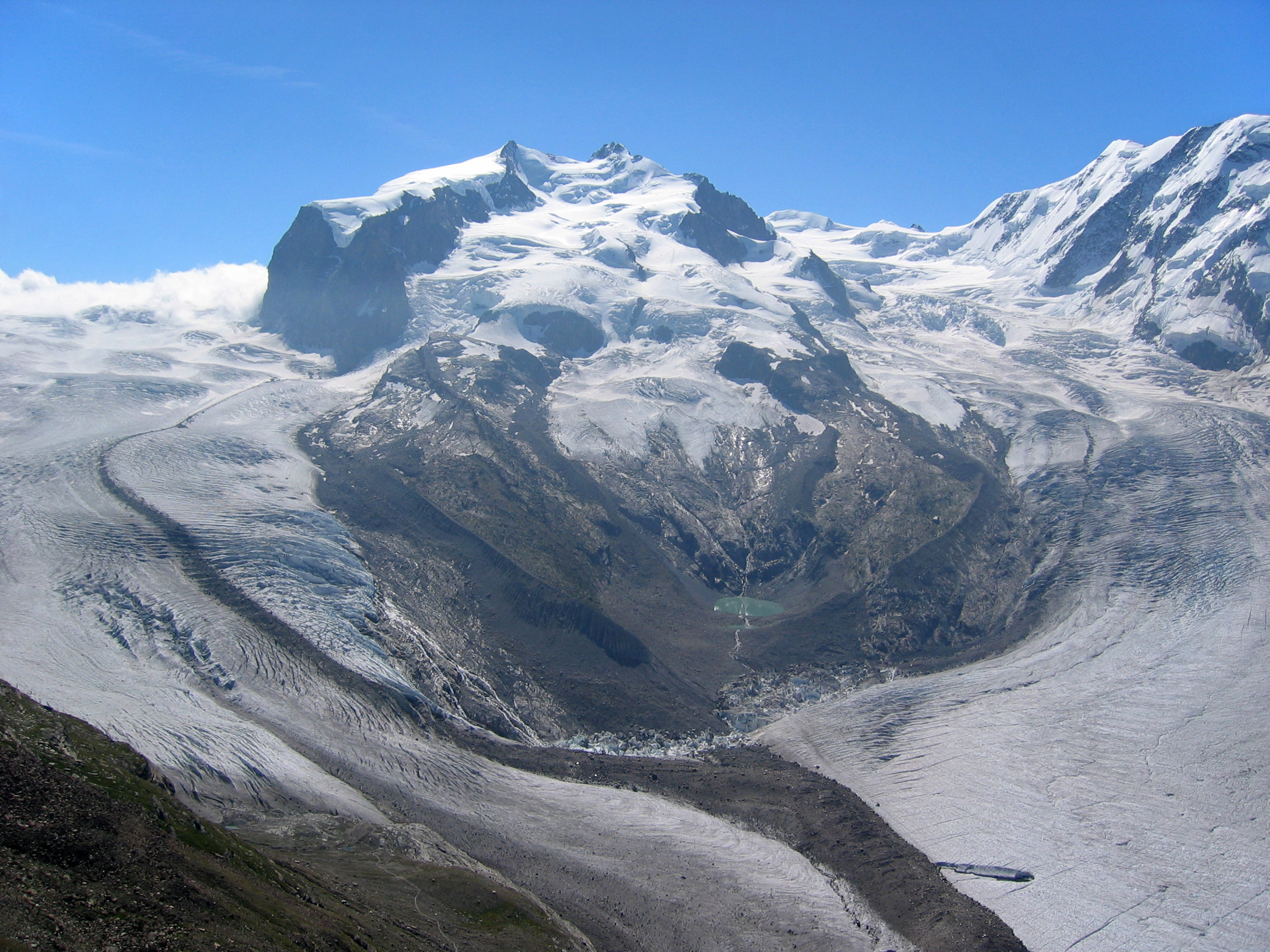
2005: The connection between the Gorner Glacier and Grenzgletscher is still present and the moraine is still fed by the former; the old Monte Rosa Hut (2,795 m) is recognizable above the left over, north-eastern lateral moraine of the Grenzgletscher (in the middle, right).

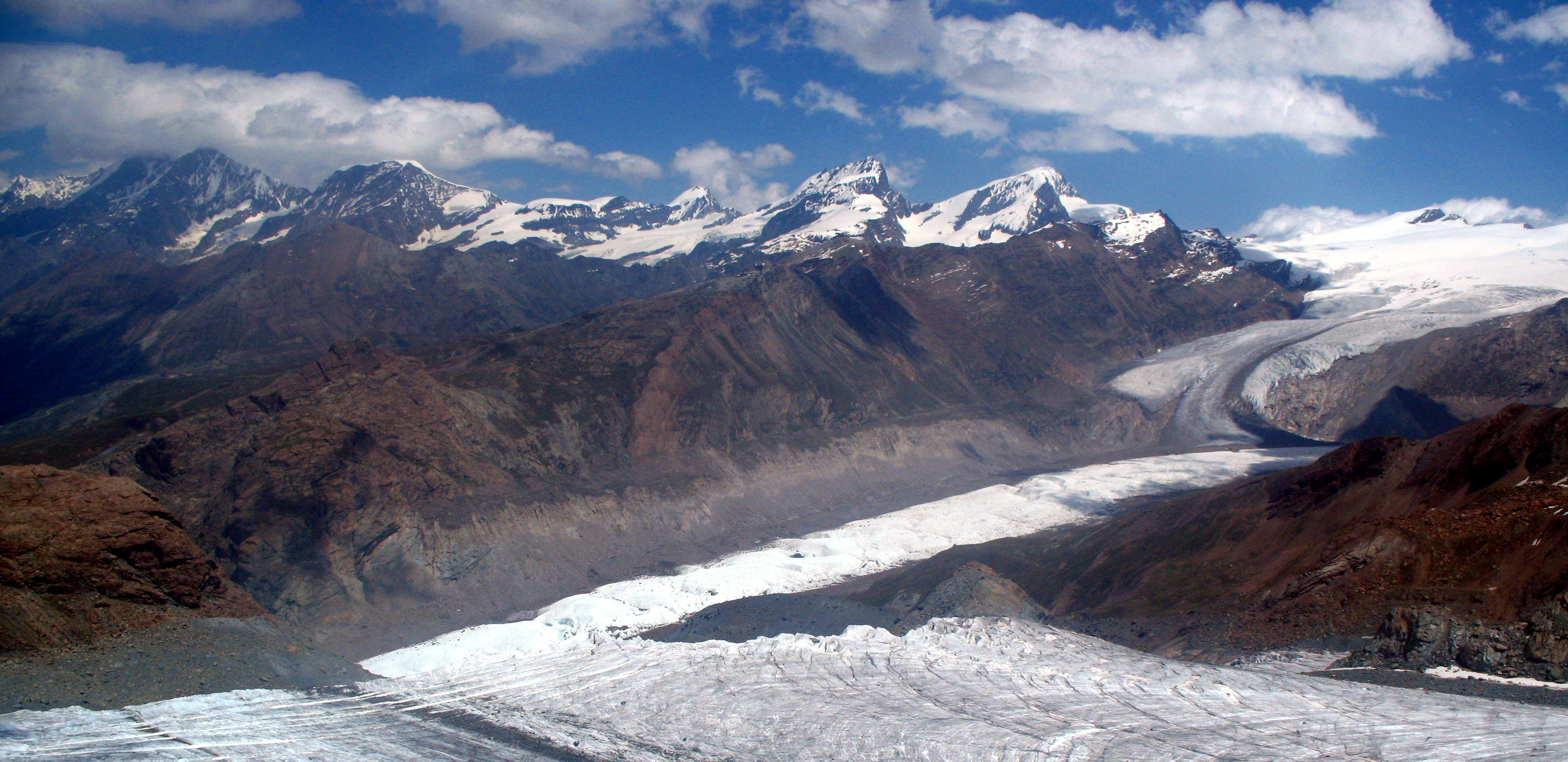
2007: The loss of thickness (about 200 m (660 ft)) of the lower Gorner Glacier since its major expansion in 1859 is recognizable on the south flank of the Gornergrat by the leftover and much higher lateral moraine (the light-coloured part above the grey flank); as seen from the Klein Matterhorn.

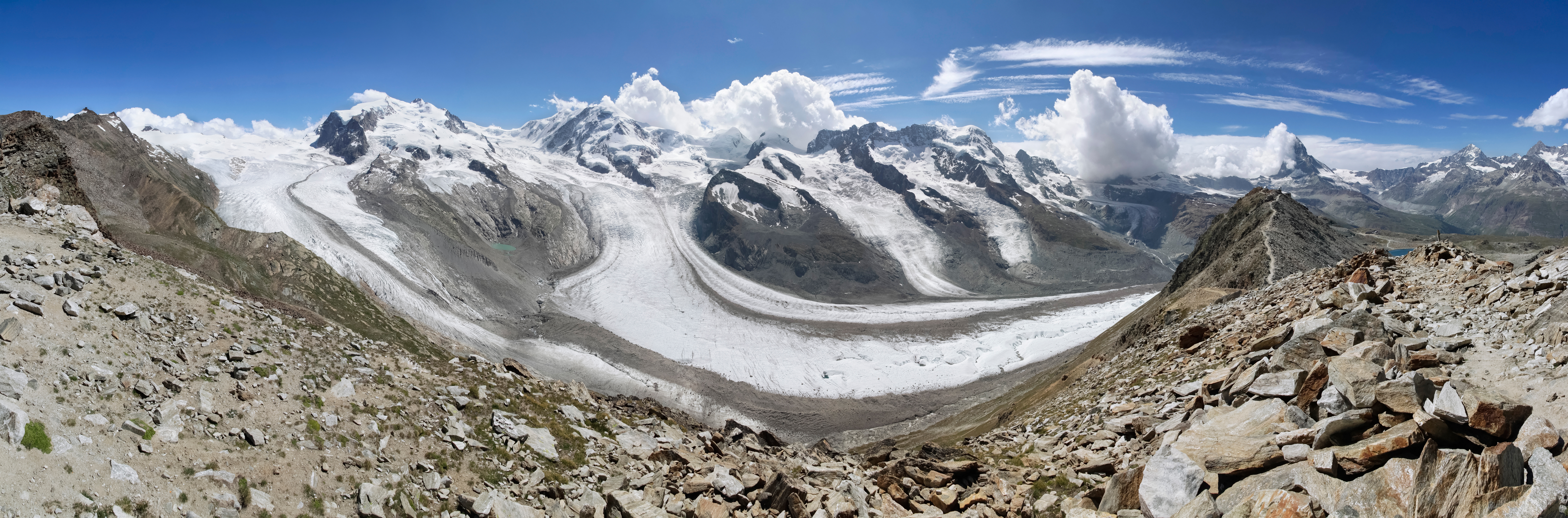
2012: The upper Gorner Glacier is losing contact with the Grenzgletcher; the middle moraine in particular will no longer be fed by its originally upper part.

== See also ==
- List of glaciers in Switzerland
- List of glaciers
- Retreat of glaciers since 1850
- Swiss Alps
