= Refuge Quintino Sella au Félik =

Refuge in the Alps

Coordinates: 45°54′05″N 7°47′35″E

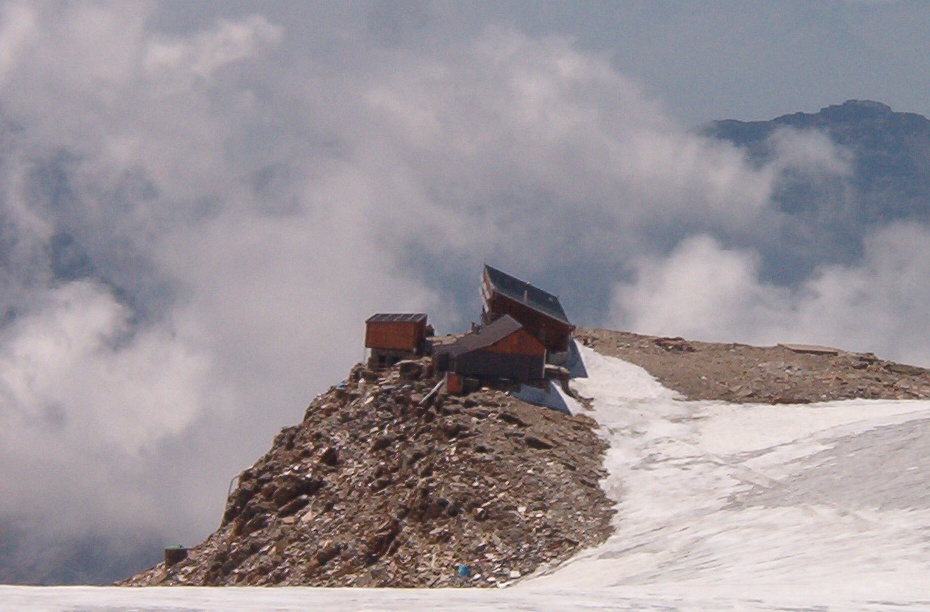
Refuge Quintino Sella au Felik

Refuge Quintino Sella au Félik is a refuge in the Alps, in the comune of Gressoney-La-Trinité, Aosta Valley, Italy. It should not be confused with the similarly named Refuge Quintino Sella (Mont-Blanc) in the Mont Blanc massif or the Rifugio Quintino Sella al Monviso in the comune of Crissolo, Piedmont. It is named after Quintino Sella, an Italian politician and mountaineer.
