= Adolfo Kind =

Italian ski pioneer

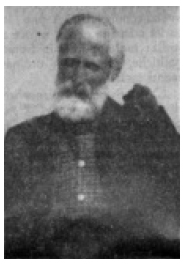
Adolfo Kind

Adolf respectively Adolfo Kind (16 September 1848 in Chur – 5 September 1907) was a Swiss chemical engineer and one of the fathers of Italian skiing.

== Life ==
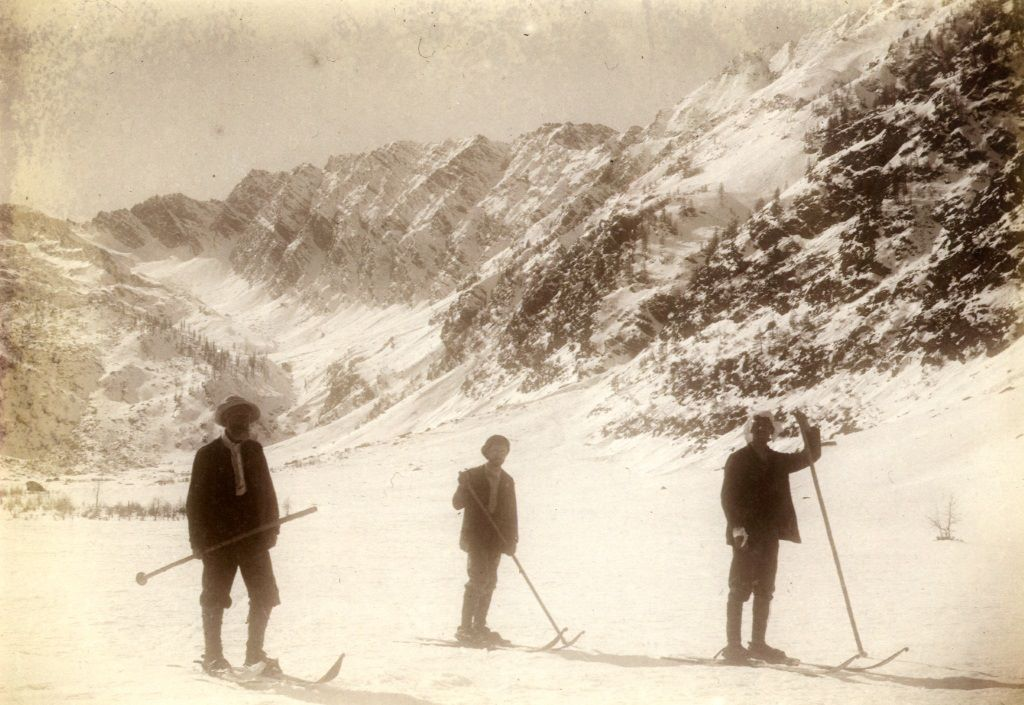
Kind with friends skiing in the Italian Piedmont

Kind was born in 1848 to a German-speaking Walser family, which had been living in Chur for more than four centuries. When his father was appointed pastor of the Evangelic Church the family went to Milan but they removed to Switzerland at the beginning of the Sardinian War in 1859 where they lived in Graubünden. Afterwards Kind studied chemical engineering in Munich und Zürich and went back to Italy in 1879 where he worked in the direction of a candle and soap company. He started a family and went to Turin in 1890 where he worked in a candle wick company.

== Skiing ==
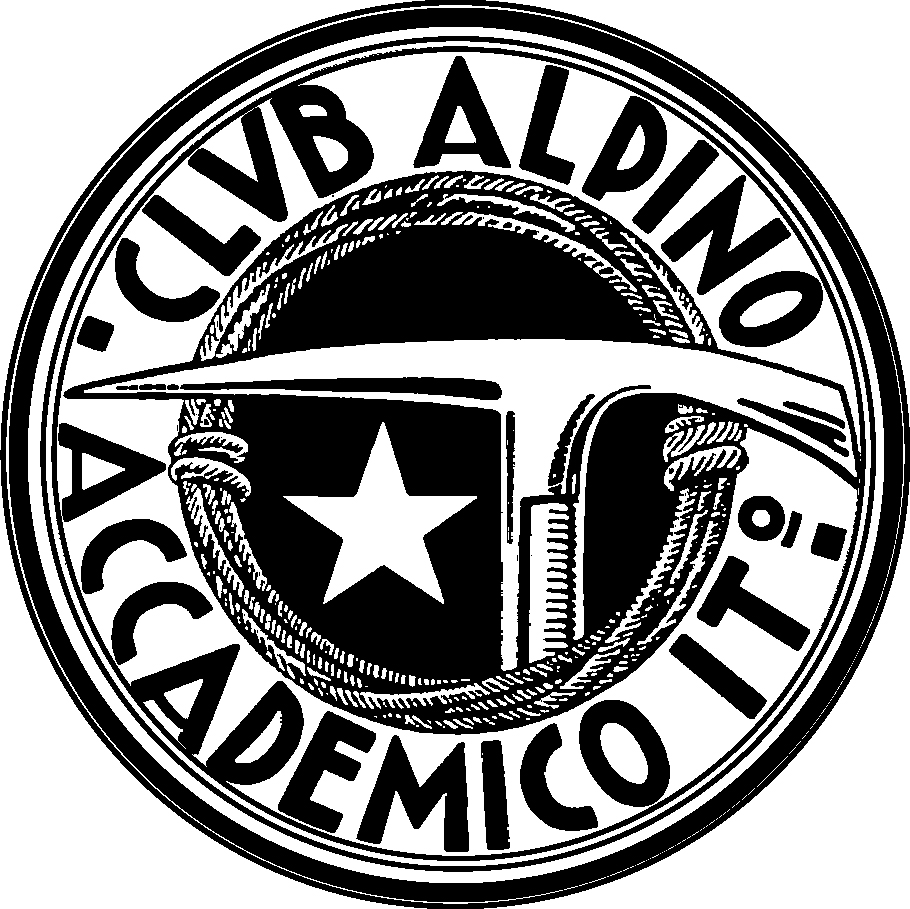
CAAI logo

Kind's family and friends became interested in skiing, while living in Turin, from his connections to the Swiss canton of Glarus. Kind started the import to the city since 1896. Their efforts to develop uphill and descending ski techniques inspired a number of skiing fans in the region. Kind, Luciano Roiti, Ottorino Mezzalama and some other friends were members of the Club Alpino Italiano (CAI). On his initiative the Italian alpine club founded the Ski Club Torino in 1901, where he was the first president until 1907, and two further ones in Genoa and Milan.

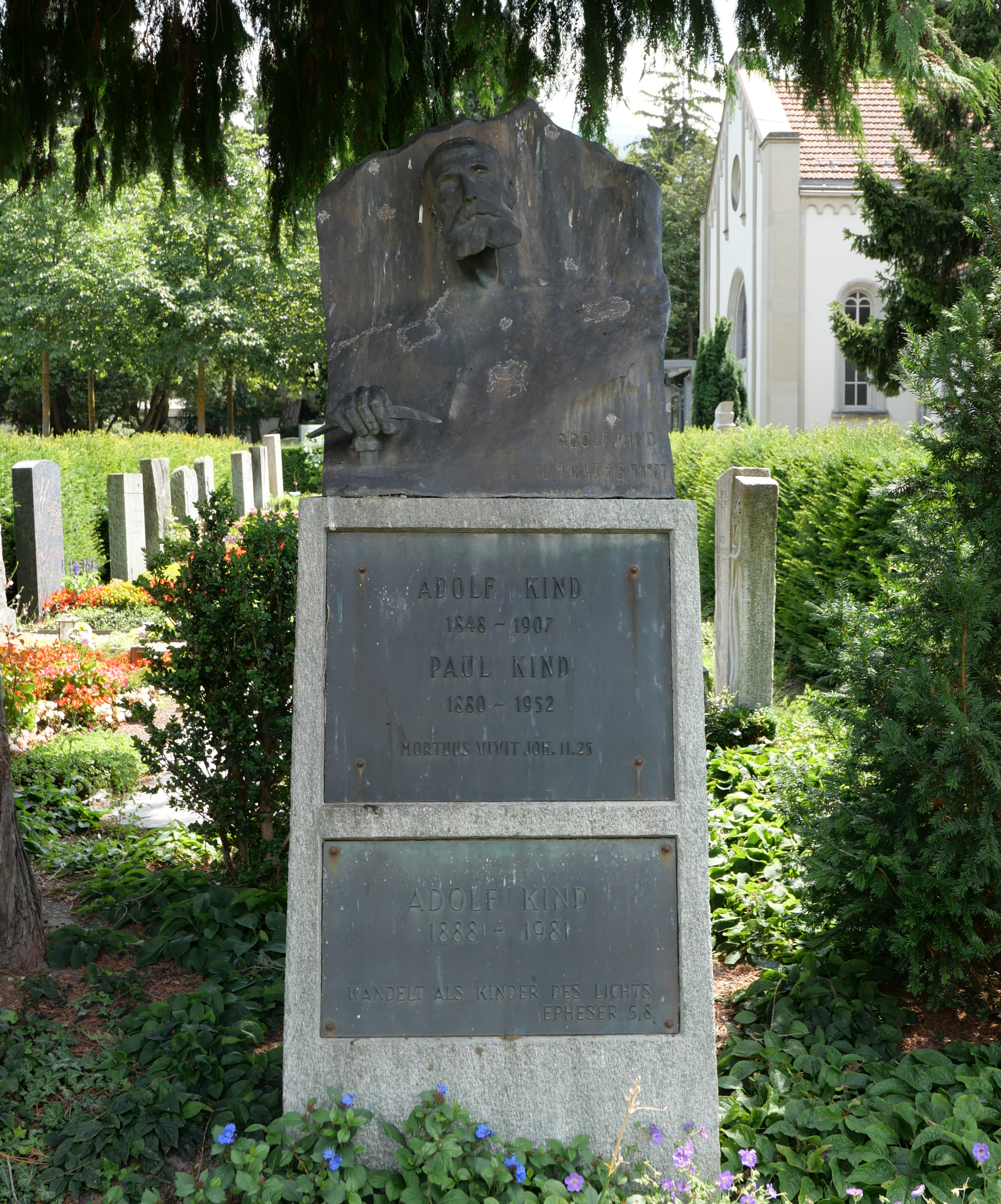
The grave of Kind, his son Paolo / Paul (1880–1952) and another Adolf Kind (1888–1981) at the Daleu cemetery of Chur.

He was a founder of the Club Alpino Accademico Italiano (CAAI), a chapter of the Club Alpino Italiano, which cooperated with the skiing club of Turin since 1904. He was president of the 400-member, five-club union, the Unione Ski Clubs Italiani, founded in 1908.

He met with an accident in a tragical way on the ascent to Piz Bernina in 1907.

A mountain hut, la Capanna Kind, was named after him having been built in 1912 with materials brought to its mountain site on the backs of mules. His great-grandsons include Paolo Kind, Renzo Kind, and Andrea Kind.

== See also ==
- History of skiing
