= Refuge Ottorino Mezzalama =

Coordinates: 45°54′49″N 7°45′34″E

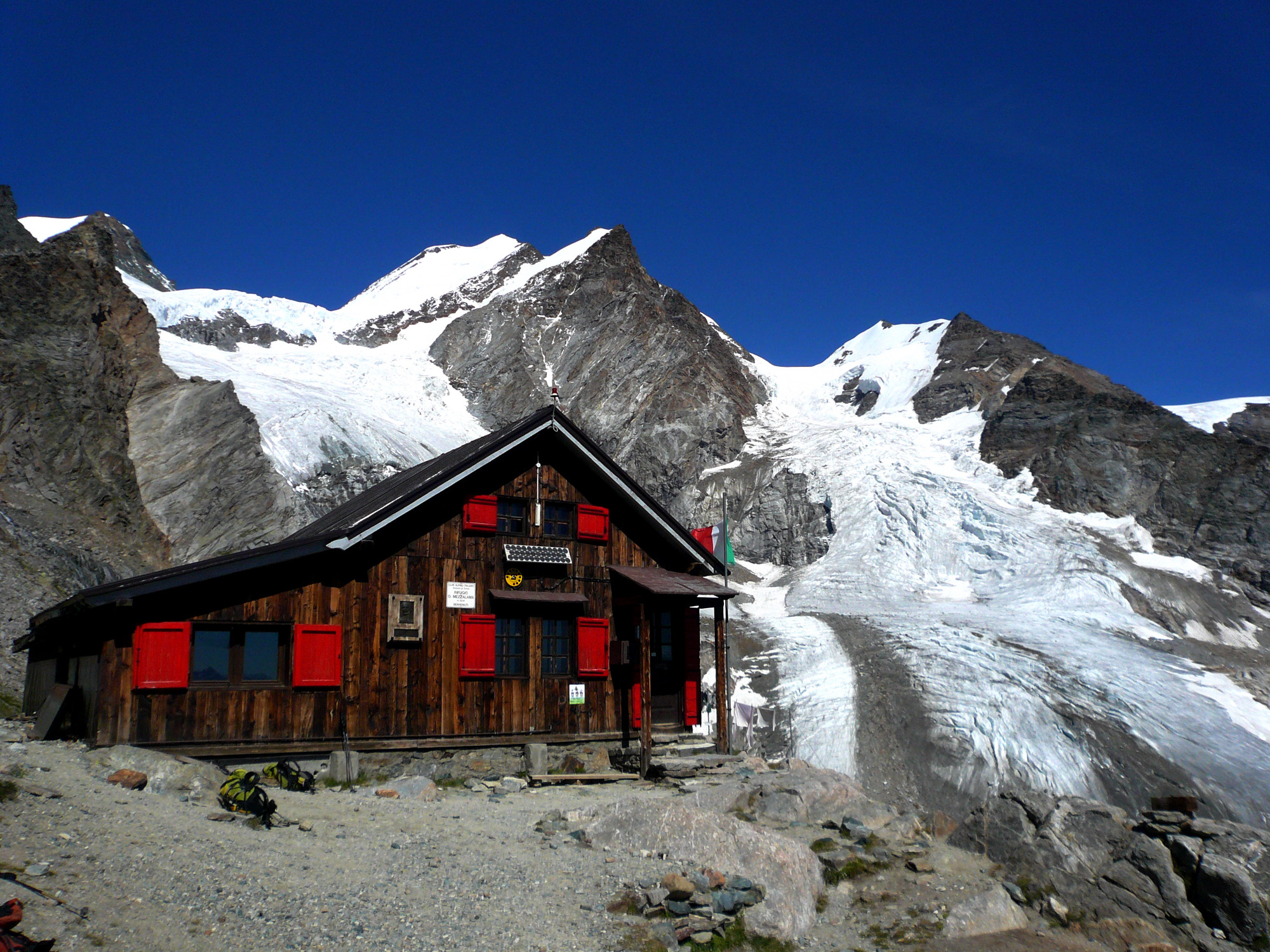
Ottorino Mezzalama hut with mountains Castor and Pollux in the background

Refuge Ottorino Mezzalama (original name Italian: Refugio Ottorino Mezzalama) is a refuge in the Alps in Aosta Valley, Italy.
